= John Golafre =

Member of the Parliament of England

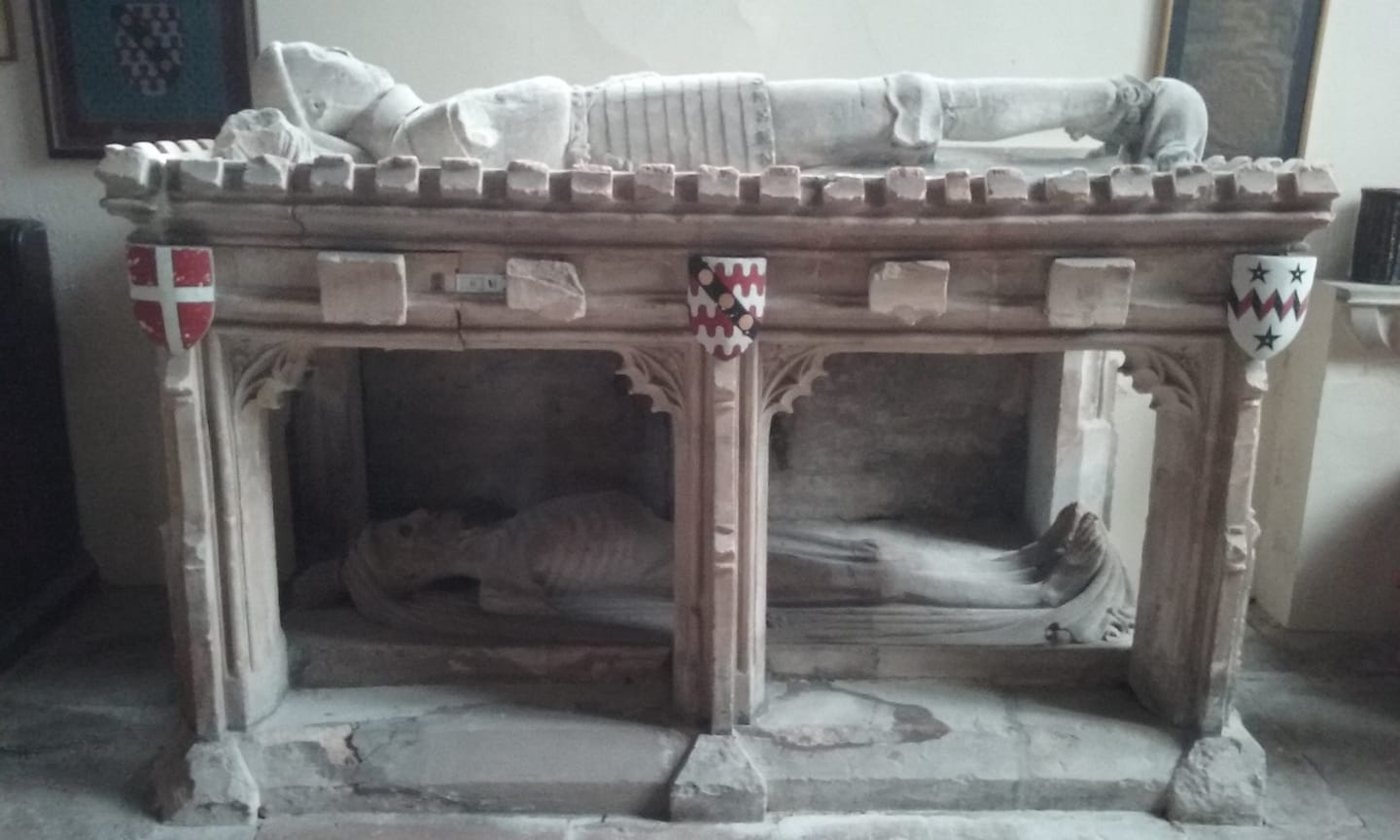
Memento Mori in St Nicholas Church, Fyfield

John Golafre (died 1442) was an English courtier and Member of Parliament.

He was born the only son of Thomas Golafre of Radley Manor in Berkshire (now Oxfordshire). An uncle was Sir John Brocas, Master of the King's Horse. An older cousin, Sir John Golafre, was a close friend of the king. By 1395 the younger John Golafre had secured a position at the court of Richard II. In 1396 his cousin died, and John Golafre inherited his extensive estates. The older Sir John had been the Constable of Wallingford Castle and was married to Philippa, daughter of Lord Mohun. He is buried in Westminster Abbey.

In 1397 John Golafre was appointed Sheriff of Oxfordshire and Berkshire. He was also that year elected as a Knight of the Shire (MP) for Oxfordshire. In 1399 he was briefly imprisoned by Henry IV for his support of King Richard, but in 1404 was reappointed sheriff. He was afterwards appointed sheriff for 1414 and 1424. During much of this period he also served as a Justice of the Peace (JP) for Oxfordshire.

He was elected MP for Berkshire in 1401 and re-elected on another 11 occasions between then and 1429. He also served on a number of commissions and was tax controller (1404), escheator (1409–1410), controller and surveyor of Woodstock Palace (1413–1438) in Oxfordshire and verderer of Woodstock Park (1398 to his death in 1442). In 1406 he gained possession of Fyfield Manor in Berkshire (now Oxfordshire), which he made his home.

He was amongst Henry V's army on his second French expedition in 1417 and was appointed Receiver-General of the Duchy of Normandy and all occupied France in 1418.

On his death in 1442 he was buried under a remarkable two-tier "memento mori" tomb in the Golafre chantry which he founded in St Nicholas' church, Fyfield. On the lower tier he is portrayed by a stone carving of a cadaver in an advanced state of decay with sunken eyes, taut neck and exposed ribs. On the upper tier he is presented in full plate armour.

He married three times: firstly Elizabeth, the daughter of Sir Edmund de la Pole of Boarstall Castle in Buckinghamshire, co-heiress of her mother, Elizabeth Handlo, and widow of Sir Ingram Bruyn of South Ockendon in Essex; secondly Nicola, the daughter and heiress of Thomas Devenish of Greatham in Hampshire and widow of John Englefield of Englefield House in Berkshire; and thirdly Margaret, the daughter of Sir John Heveningham, and widow of Sir Walter de la Pole of Dernford in Sawston, Cambridgeshire.

Parliament of England
Preceded by John Abberbury; Thomas Barantyn	Member of Parliament for Oxfordshire; 1397–1398; With: William Wilcotes	Succeeded by John Wilcotes; Thomas Barantyn
Preceded by Robert James; Edmund Sparsholt	Member of Parliament for Berkshire; 1401; With: Thomas Gloucester	Succeeded by John Arches; Robert James
Preceded by Sir William Langford; Edmund Sparsholt	Member of Parliament for Berkshire; 1404; With: John Arches	Succeeded by Thomas Childrey; Laurence Drew
Preceded by Thomas Childrey; Laurence Drew	Member of Parliament for Berkshire; 1407–1410; With: Edmund Sparsholt 1407; Robert James 1410	Unknown
Unknown	Member of Parliament for Berkshire; 1413–1414; With: Robert de la Mare 1413; Edmund Sparsholt 1414	Succeeded by Laurence Drew; John Shotesbrook
Unknown	Member of Parliament for Berkshire; 1416; With: Sir Peter Bessels	Unknown
Preceded by William Danvers; Thomas Rothwell	Member of Parliament for Berkshire; 1421; With: William Fynderne	Succeeded by William Danvers; William Perkins
Preceded by William Danvers; William Perkins	Member of Parliament for Berkshire; 1422; With: Unknown	Succeeded by Sir Peter Bessels; Unknown
Unknown	Member of Parliament for Berkshire; 1426–1430; With: Unknown	Unknown
Political offices
Preceded by William Wood	High Sheriff of Berkshire and Oxfordshire; 1397–1399	Succeeded by Nicholas Golafre
Preceded by Thomas Chaucer	High Sheriff of Berkshire and Oxfordshire; 1404–1405	Succeeded by Sir William Langford
Preceded by Thomas Wykeham	High Sheriff of Berkshire and Oxfordshire; 1414–1415	Succeeded by John Wilcotes
Preceded by Sir Thomas Stonor	High Sheriff of Berkshire and Oxfordshire; 1424–1426	Succeeded by Sir Richard Walkstead
