= 1878 Oxfordshire by-election =

UK Parliamentary by-election

The 1878 Oxfordshire by-election was fought on 5 February 1878. The by-election was fought due to the resignation of the incumbent Conservative MP, Joseph Warner Henley. It was won by the unopposed Conservative candidate Edward William Harcourt.
