= John Rede (died 1404) =

English politician (died 1404)

John Rede (died 1404), of Checkendon, Oxfordshire, was an English politician.

Rede was a Member of the Parliament of England for Oxfordshire constituency in September 1388 and 1391.

Parliament of England
Preceded by William Wilcotes with Thomas Barantyn	Member of Parliament for Oxfordshire; 1388; With: Thomas de la Pole	Succeeded by William Wilcotes with Thomas Barantyn
Parliament of England
Preceded by Thomas de la Pole with Thomas Barantyn	Member of Parliament for Oxfordshire; 1391; With: William Wilcotes	Succeeded by Thomas Paynell with Thomas Barantyn
