= John Wilcotes =

English politician

John Wilcotes (died 1422), of Great Tew, Oxfordshire, was an English politician.

== Family ==
Wilcotes is thought to have been a younger brother of William Wilcotes. John married a woman named Alice, circa 1396. She was probably a widow from Chelmscote of Great Tew. She died in 1410. Wilcote's second wife was Elizabeth Cheyne, daughter of Richard Cheyne of Shurland, Isle of Sheppey, Kent, and Margery Cralle of Cralle, Sussex, a sister of William Cheyne. The Cheynes were a prominent Kentish family. Elizabeth was also a widow, having previously been married to Sir William Septvance of Milton near Canterbury. He had died in 1407. They had two daughters, and he had an illegitimate son, Thomas Wilcotes.

== Career ==
Wilcotes was a Member of Parliament for Oxfordshire in 1399, 1401, October 1404, 1406, 1407, May 1413, April 1414, November 1414, 1417, 1419 and May 1421. He was an MP for Kent March 1416.

He was appointed High Sheriff of Oxfordshire and Berkshire for 1402, 1408, 1416, 1420 and from May 1422 to his death later that year. He also served as High Sheriff of Gloucestershire from November 1420 to May 1422.

He was appointed receiver-general of the Duchy of Cornwall, steward of the duchy's Devon estates and Warden of the Stannaries for Devon from 2 April 1413 to his death.

Parliament of England
Preceded by William Wilcotes; John Golafre	Member of Parliament for Oxfordshire; 1399–1401; With: Thomas Barantyn 1399; Thomas Chaucer 1401	Succeeded by Thomas Chaucer; Thomas Wykeham
Preceded by Sir Peter Bessels; William Mackney	Member of Parliament for Oxfordshire; 1404–1407; With: John Drayton 1404; Thomas Chaucer 1406–1407	Succeeded by Thomas Chaucer; William Wilcotes
Unknown	Member of Parliament for Oxfordshire; 1413–1414; With: Thomas Chaucer 1413, Nov. 1414; Sir William Lisle Apr. 1414	Unknown
Unknown	Member of Parliament for Kent; 1416; With: William Cheyne	Unknown
Unknown	Member of Parliament for Oxfordshire; 1417–1419; With: Sir William Lisle 1417; Thomas Stonor 1419	Succeeded by John Danvers; Richard Greville
Preceded by John Danvers; Richard Greville	Member of Parliament for Oxfordshire; 1421; With: Thomas Chaucer	Succeeded by John Danvers; Peter Fettiplace
Political offices
Preceded by Thomas Chaucer	High Sheriff of Berkshire and Oxfordshire; 1401–1402	Succeeded by Robert James
Preceded by Sir Robert Corbet	High Sheriff of Berkshire and Oxfordshire; 1407–1408	Succeeded by Sir Thomas Harcourt
Preceded by John Golafre	High Sheriff of Berkshire and Oxfordshire; 1415–1416	Succeeded by Robert James
Preceded by Robert Andrews	High Sheriff of Berkshire and Oxfordshire; 1419–1420	Succeeded by Sir William Lisle
Preceded by Sir William Lisle	High Sheriff of Berkshire and Oxfordshire; 1422	Succeeded by Sir William Lisle
