= Richard Abberbury the Elder =

Sir Richard Abberbury the Elder
- Born: 1331
- Died: April 1399 (aged 67–68)
- Occupation: Chamberlain to Anne of Bohemia
- Known for: Serving as Chamberlain to Queen Anne of Bohemia, Founding Donnington Hospital charity
- Notable work: Construction of Donnington Castle
- Spouse: Agnes Shareshull
- Children: Richard Abberbury the Younger
- Parent: Thomas Abberbury

Sir Richard Abberbury the Elder (1331–1399) was the Chamberlain to Anne of Bohemia, Queen to King Richard II of England.

== Family ==
Richard was the son of Thomas Abberbury of Donnington in Berkshire and Steeple Aston in Oxfordshire. and inherited the Donnington estate from him in 1353. He married Agnes, the daughter of Chief Justice Sir William Shareshull and was knighted in 1359 by the Black Prince. They had two sons, including Richard Abberbury the Younger. He was a justice of the peace in Berkshire, Oxfordshire, and Wiltshire.

== Career ==
Richard subsequently fought under the Prince in 1359 and then in Gascony in 1366 and 1368, remaining there until after 1371. He was at sea with his retinue of men-at-arms and archers in 1374, and in 1378, he sailed to France with Sir John Golafre to take up a post as Captain of Brest, undertaking the duties for a year. In 1382, he was appointed Chamberlain to Queen Anne of Bohemia. He was elected MP for Oxfordshire in 1373 and 1386.

In 1386 he was given permission by King Richard II to turn his manor at Donnington into a fortified castle, to become known as Donnington Castle. In 1393, Sir Richard founded the Donnington Hospital charity and built the almshouses on the site of the present 1602 ones in Donnington. He died in April 1399.

Parliament of England
Preceded by Richard de la Bere	Member of Parliament for Oxfordshire; 1373	Succeeded by Robert Simeon
Parliament of England
Preceded by Thomas Blount	Member of Parliament for Oxfordshire; 1386; With: Gilbert Wace	Succeeded by William Wilcotes with Thomas Barantyn
