= Oxfordshire (disambiguation) =

Oxfordshire is a county in England.

Oxfordshire can also refer to:

- Oxfordshire County Council, a local authority
- Oxfordshire (UK Parliament constituency), constituency which existed up to 1885
