= John Adderbury =

English politician

- Born: 1382
- Died: 1421 (aged 38–39)
- Occupation: politician

John Adderbury (fl. 1382–1421) was an English politician. He sat as MP for Oxfordshire in 1394 and January 1397.

He also served as commissioner to put down rebellion in Oxfordshire in March and December 1382, commissioner to collect an aid in December 1401, justice of the peace of Oxfordshire from July till December 1382, February 1394 till April 1399, February 1412 till October 1413, alnager of Oxfordshire from 24 November 1394 till 8 February 1397 and tax collector of Oxfordshire in June 1404.

He was the son and heir of Walter atte Hall of Adderbury. Before March 1411, he married a woman called Alice. He married his second wife, Joan (died c. 1434). He had no children.
