= William Danvers =

Member of the Parliament of England

William Danvers (1428 – 19 April 1504) of Chamberhouse Castle in Thatcham, Berkshire, was an English judge. He was a Serjeant-at-Law and a justice of the peace.

== Origins ==
He was a younger son of John Danvers (died 1449) of Calthorpe, near Banbury and of Prescote in the parish of Cropredy, both in Oxfordshire who served four times as a member of parliament for Oxfordshire, in 1420, 1421, 1423 and 1435. His mother (his father's second wife) was Joan Bruley, daughter and heiress of John Bruley, of Waterstock, Oxfordshire, a son of William Bruley, MP. His elder half-brother was Sir Robert Danvers (d.1467), another notable judge.

== Career ==
He became a justice of the peace for Oxfordshire in 1456, and served again for Berkshire in 1463. He represented Taunton in Parliament in 1467 and 1472, and with him in that Parliament was his brother Thomas, who sat for Downton. William was also member for Hindon in 1478. He became a Serjeant-at-Law in 1485 and was made a Justice of the Court of Common Pleas on 5 February 1488.

On the death of his brother Thomas Danvers in 1502, William Danvers inherited the manors of Adderbury, Colthorpe, and the family property in Banbury, Bourton, Cropredy, Milton, and elsewhere.

== Marriage ==
In 1470 he married Anne Pury, by whom he was the grandfather of Edmund Docwra MP and great-grandfather of Henry Docwra, 1st Baron Docwra of Culmore.

== Death ==
He died on 19 April 1504 and was buried in St Mary's Church, Thatcham.

Parliament of England
Preceded by Unknown	Member of Parliament for Taunton; 1467, 1470, 1472; With: Robert Ashetill (1467); Edward Aysshton (1470); Unknown (1472)	Succeeded by Edward Aysshton
Preceded by Robert Tylney	Member of Parliament for Hindon; 1478	Succeeded by Unknown
