= Prescote =

Hamlet in Oxfordshire, England

Coordinates: 52.134°N 1.301°W

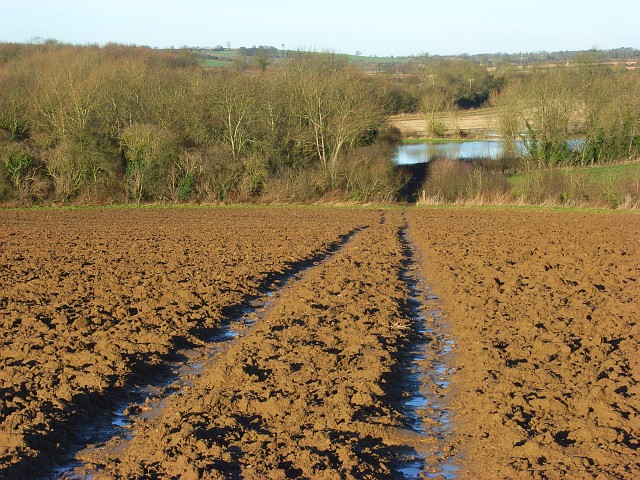
- Bridleway, Prescote

- Location within Oxfordshire
- Population: 16 (2001 census)
- OS grid reference: SP4746
- Civil parish: Prescote
- District: Cherwell
- Shire county: Oxfordshire
- Region: South East
- Country: England
- Sovereign state: United Kingdom
- Post town: Banbury
- Postcode district: OX17
- Dialling code: 01295
- Police: Thames Valley
- Fire: Oxfordshire
- Ambulance: South Central
- UK Parliament: Banbury

Prescote is a hamlet and civil parish about 4 miles (6.4 km) north of Banbury in Oxfordshire. Its boundaries are the River Cherwell in the southeast, a tributary of the Cherwell called Highfurlong Brook in the west, and Oxfordshire's boundary with Northamptonshire in the northeast.

== History ==
Prescote's toponym probably means "priest's cottage", referring to a cottage either owned by a priest or more likely inhabited by one. Legend associates Prescote with Saint Fremund, a Mercian prince held to have been martyred in the 9th century AD.

The manor of Prescote is not listed in the Domesday Book of 1086, but had appeared by 1208–09, when the Bishop of Lincoln was the feudal overlord. Prescote comprised two manors that were held separately until 1417–1419, when John Danvers (died 1449) of Calthorpe, Oxfordshire, acquired both of them. In 1796, his descendant Sir Michael Danvers, 5th Baronet (1738–1776) died without a male heir and left Prescote to his son-in-law Augustus Richard Butler. In 1798, Butler sold the estate to the Pares family, who in 1867 sold it to Samuel Jones-Loyd, 1st Baron Overstone. In 1883, Baron Overstone died without a male heir and left his estates to his daughter, Harriet, Lady Wantage. On her death in 1920, Prescote was sold to A.P. McDougall, whose Midland Marts company opened a cattle stockyard in 1921 beside Banbury Merton Street railway station. By 1964, Prescote belonged to Anne Crossman, the wife of Richard Crossman M.P., a descendant of the Danvers family.

Prescote manor house has traces of a mediaeval moat, but a date-stone over the door of the present house indicates that it was built in 1691 by Sir Pope Danvers, 2nd Baronet (1644–1712). The house was extended early in the 19th century. The house at Prescote Manor Farm, about 0.5 miles (800 m) northeast of the Manor House, is dated 1693.

Prescote had a mill on the River Cherwell, called Boltysmylle in 1482 and Boltes Mill in 1613. By 1654, there was a "Prescote Mill", which may be the same as the earlier Boltes Mill. By 1703, the mill was in disrepair but its remains were still recorded as extant in 1797-98 and 1823. Today only its mill stream survives. The mill's decline may be linked with the manor's transition from arable to sheep farming. In 1547, a Danvers leased land at Prescote to a shepherd, and in 1797 it was reported that most of the 385 acres (156 ha) of the farm attached to Prescote Manor was "old inclosed" pasture.

== Sources and further reading ==
- Colvin, Christina; Cooper, Janet; Cooper, N.H.; Harvey, P.D.A.; Hollings, Marjory; Hook, Judith; Jessup, Mary; Lobel, Mary D.; Mason, J.F.A.; Trinder, B.S.; Turner, Hilary (1972). Crossley, Alan (ed.). A History of the County of Oxford, Volume 10: Banbury Hundred. Victoria County History. pp. 206–210. ISBN 978-0-19-722728-2.
- Sherwood, Jennifer; Pevsner, Nikolaus (1974). Oxfordshire. The Buildings of England. Harmondsworth: Penguin Books. p. 560. ISBN 0-14-071045-0.
- Wass, Stephen; Dealtry, Rebecca (2011). "Possible Early Christian Enclosure and Deserted Medieval Settlement at Prescote, Near Cropredy". Oxoniensia. LXXVI. Oxfordshire Architectural and Historical Society: 266–272. ISSN 0308-5562.
