= Montagu Bertie, 6th Earl of Abingdon =

British politician (1808-1884)

Montagu Bertie, 6th Earl of Abingdon (19 June 1808 – 8 February 1884) was a British peer and politician. He was styled Lord Norreys from birth until acceding in 1854.

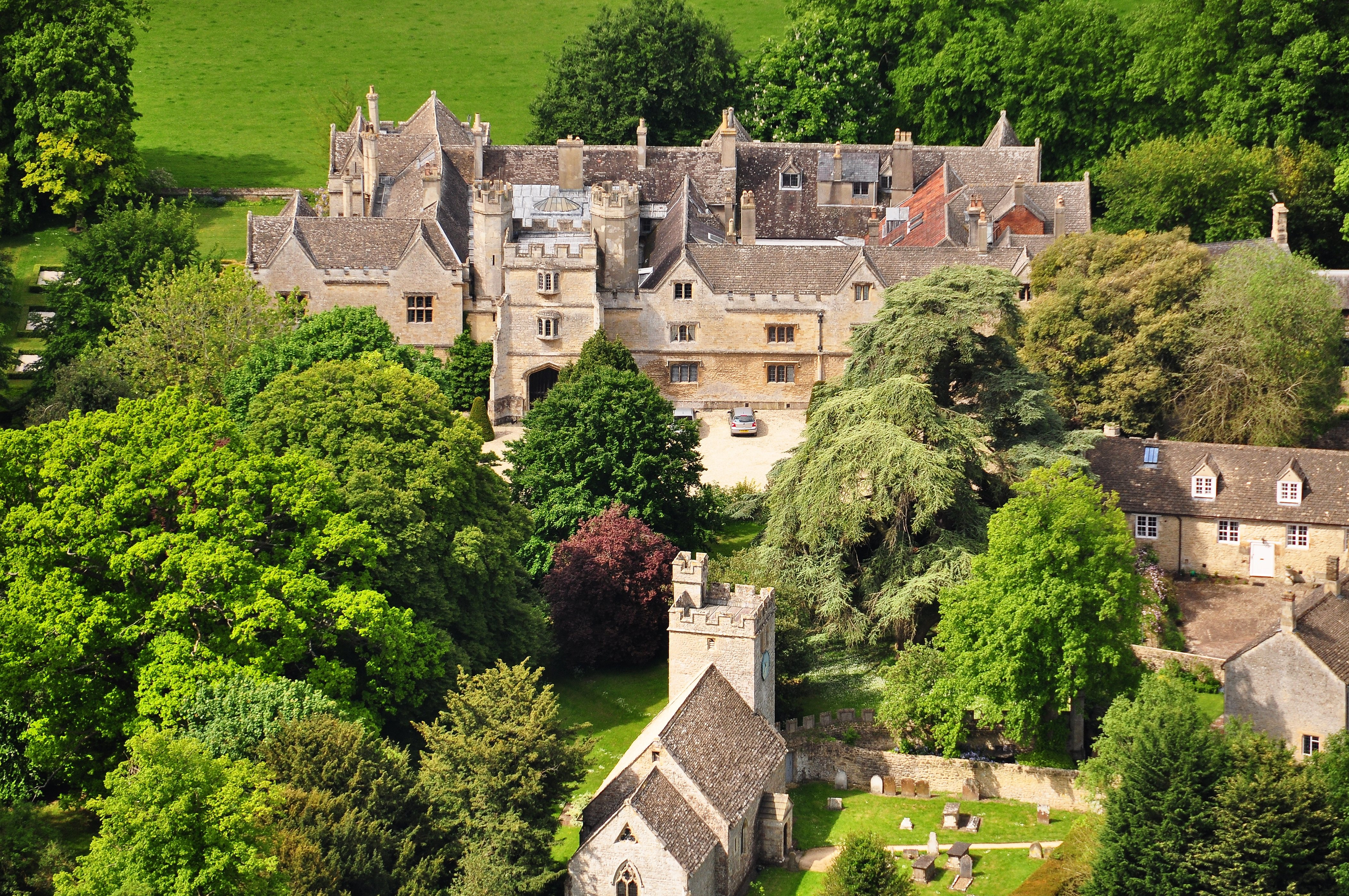
Wytham Abbey

== Background ==
Born at Dover Street, he was the eldest son of Montagu Bertie, 5th Earl of Abingdon and his first wife Emily Gage, fifth daughter of General Hon. Thomas Gage. Bertie was educated at Eton College and Trinity College, Cambridge, where he graduated with a Master of Arts in 1829. On 11 June 1834, he received a Doctorate of Civil Law from the University of Oxford.

== Career ==
Norreys was commissioned a lieutenant in the 1st Regiment of Oxfordshire Yeomanry Cavalry on 9 July 1827. He was promoted to captain on 26 December 1830 and to major on 14 April 1847. He resigned his commission by May 1855.

In 1830, he became Member of Parliament (MP) for Oxfordshire and held the seat for almost a year. He was appointed a deputy lieutenant of the county on 26 March 1831. In 1832, the representation for the constituency was increased to three members and Bertie was re-elected that year to complement his successors. He was then elected MP for Abingdon in 1852 and on succeeding to his father's title and leaving the British House of Commons two years later, he became Lord Lieutenant of Berkshire.

In 1876, he sold the manor of Dorchester to Sir John Christopher Willoughby, 5th Baronet.

== Family ==
On 7 January 1835, he married Elizabeth Lavinia Anne Harcourt, the only daughter of his fellow MP, George Granville Harcourt at Nuneham Courtenay. They lived at Wytham Abbey in Berkshire (now Oxfordshire) and had nine children:

- Montagu Bertie, 7th Earl of Abingdon (1836–1928)
- Lady Elizabeth Emily Bertie (1838 – 4 May 1923)
- Lady Lavinia Louisa Bertie (1843 – 5 July 1928), married Robert Bickersteth on 16 January 1883, without issue
- Francis Bertie, 1st Viscount Bertie of Thame (1844–1919)
- Hon. Alberic Edward Bertie (14 November 1846 – 20 March 1928), married Lady Caroline McDonnell, daughter of Mark McDonnell, 5th Earl of Antrim, on 27 April 1881 and had issue
- Lady Frances Evelyn Bertie (1848 – 29 August 1929), a nun
- Lt-Col. Hon. George Aubrey Vere Bertie (2 May 1850 – 8 November 1926), married Harriet Farquhar, daughter of Sir Walter Farquhar, 3rd Baronet, on 13 October 1885 and had issue
- Lt. Hon. Charles Claude Bertie (31 August 1851 – 4 September 1920), married Adelaide Burroughes without issue, daughter of Reverend Jeremiah Burroughes and Pleasance Preston.
- Col. Hon. Reginald Henry Bertie (26 May 1856 – 15 June 1950), married Lady Amy Courtenay, daughter of Henry Courtenay, Lord Courtenay, without issue

Lord Abingdon died in Mayfair, London in 1884 and was succeeded in his titles by his eldest son, Montagu. He left part of his Oxfordshire estates (the manors of Thame, North Weston, Beckley and Horton-cum-Studley) to his second son Francis.

Before his death he owned 21,000 acres, mostly in Oxfordshire, Berkshire and Lancaster.

Parliament of the United Kingdom
Preceded by William Ashurst; John Fane	Member of Parliament for Oxfordshire; 1830 – 1831; With: John Fane	Succeeded by George Harcourt; Richard Weyland
Preceded by George Harcourt; Richard Weyland	Member of Parliament for Oxfordshire; 1832 – 1852; With: George Harcourt 1832–1852; Richard Weyland 1832–1837; Thomas Parker 1837–1841; Joseph Warner Henley 1841–1852	Succeeded by George Harcourt; Joseph Warner Henley; John North
Preceded by James Caulfeild	Member of Parliament for Abingdon; 1852 – 1854	Succeeded by Joseph Reed
Honorary titles
Preceded by The Earl of Abingdon	Lord Lieutenant of Berkshire; 1854–1881	Succeeded by The Earl of Craven
Peerage of England
Preceded by Montagu Bertie	Earl of Abingdon; 1854–1884	Succeeded by Montagu Bertie
