= John Fane (1775–1850) =

British Tory politician

John Fane (9 July 1775 – 4 October 1850), of Wormsley nr. Watlington, Oxfordshire, was a British Tory politician.

== Background ==
A member of the Fane family headed by the Earl of Westmorland, Fane was the son of John Fane, of Wormsley, Oxfordshire, and Lady Elizabeth, daughter of Thomas Parker, 3rd Earl of Macclesfield.

== Political career ==
Fane succeeded his father as Member of Parliament for Oxfordshire in 1824, a seat he held until 1831. He also served as High Sheriff of Oxfordshire in 1835.

An anti-Catholic, he generally supported the Tory line.

== Family ==
Fane married Elizabeth, daughter of William Lowndes-Stone-Norton, in 1801. They had several children, including his heir John Fane, Reverend Frederick Adrian Scrope Fane (1810–1894) and George Augustus Scrope Fane (1817–1860). He died in October 1850. His wife survived him by 15 years and died in November 1865.

Parliament of the United Kingdom
Preceded by John Fane; William Henry Ashurst	Member of Parliament for Oxfordshire; 1824–1831; With: William Henry Ashurst 1824–1831; Lord Norreys 1830–1831	Succeeded by George Harcourt; Richard Weyland
Honorary titles
Preceded by William Francis Lowndes-Stone	High Sheriff of Oxfordshire; 1835	Succeeded by Thomas Stonor
