= Edmund Docwra =

16th-century English politician

Edmund Docwra (fl. 1571–1572), of Chamberhouse Castle at Crookham near Thatcham in Berkshire, was an English politician.

He was a Member (MP) of the Parliament of England for Aylesbury in 1571 and for New Windsor in 1572.

He was the second son of Martin Docwra and Isabel Danvers. The Docwras were a minor gentry family, originally from Yorkshire. They had a tradition of service with Robert Dudley, 1st Earl of Leicester, who acted as Edmond's patron and secured for him a seat in the Commons. Edmund referred to his long and faithful service to Leicester and his father.

He married Dorothy Golding, daughter of John Golding of Halstead, and was the father of the distinguished soldier and statesman Henry Docwra, 1st Baron Docwra of Culmore, who is still remembered as "the founder of Derry". His maternal grandfather was Sir William Danvers, a justice of the Court of Common Pleas. In his later years, he suffered serious financial difficulties and was eventually forced to sell Chamberhouse.
