= Thomas Blount (died 1400) =

Supporter of Richard II of England

Sir Thomas Blount (died 1400) was a supporter of Richard II of England.

== Background ==
Blount was the eldest son of Sir Thomas Blount (c.1321-c.1407) and his wife, Joan Hakluyt.

He married in 1387 the widow of the former treasurer of the Exchequer, Sir Hugh Segrave. A second marriage gained him land in Wiltshire and Hampshire and allowed him to represent Wiltshire in Parliament in 1397 with Sir Henry Greene.

== Life at Court ==
At Richard II's coronation, Sir Thomas was deputy for John Hastings, earl of Pembroke, in the office of king's 'naperer,' or keeper of his linen, and he was in close attendance on Richard II throughout his reign. At its close, he declined to recognize the claim of Henry IV to supersede Richard.

After Henry's coronation (6 October 1399), he joined John Holland, Earl of Huntingdon, Thomas Holland, Earl of Kent, the Earl of Salisbury, the Earl of Rutland, the Abbot of Westminster, and others in an insurrection, now known as the Epiphany Rising. Sir Thomas, who is described by contemporary chroniclers as a noble and wise knight, met the leading conspirators at dinner with the Abbot of Westminster on 18 December 1399, and there they agreed to surprise Henry at a tournament at Windsor.

But Henry discovered the plot through the treachery of the Earl of Rutland, and, summoning an army in London, advanced against the rebels, who had assembled in some hundreds near Windsor. The latter retreated before Henry, and managed to reach Cirencester, where many of them were captured (6 January 1400), but Blount, with a few friends, fled to Oxford, and was taken and executed on 12 January in the Green Ditch near the city. Eleven persons, described as Blount's servants, were condemned to outlawry at Oxford at the same time, and afterwards (19 February 1400) pardoned. Most of the other leading plotters were executed.

== Execution ==
The revolting cruelty of Blount's death was described at great length by many contemporary chroniclers. He was first hanged, then cut down and eviscerated, although still alive and replying to the taunts of Sir Thomas Erpingham, the king's chamberlain, who directed the horrible procedure; he was finally beheaded and quartered, and his head was sent to London. His large estates were forfeited to the crown, but some were bestowed on Sir Walter Blount (d. 1403), a distant relative, and his wife Sancha. With Sir Thomas Blount the Belton line of the Blount family became extinct.

One contemporaneous account read:

Sir Thomas Blount was hanged; but the halter was soon cut, and he was made to sit on a bench before a great fire, and the executioner came with a razor in his hand, and knelt before Sir Thomas, whose hands were tied, begging him to pardon him his death, as he must do his office. Sir Thomas asked, "Are you the person appointed to deliver me from this world?" The executioner answered, "Yes, Sir, I pray you pardon me." And Sir Thomas kissed him, and pardoned him his death. The executioner then knelt down, and opened his belly, and cut out his bowels, and threw them into the fire. While Sir Thomas was dying, one Erpyngham, the king's chamberlain, insulting Blount, said to him, in derision, "Go, seek a master that can cure you." Blount only answered, "Te Deum laudamus! Blessed be the day on which I was born, and blessed be this day, for I shall die in the service of my sovereign lord, the noble King Richard". His head was soon after cut off and he was quartered.

His death is mentioned in Shakespeare's play Richard II in the final act when Northumberland enters to tell King Henry "The next news is, I have to London sent. The heads of Salisbury, Spencer, Blunt, and Kent."

== Aftermath ==
Sir Thomas's cousin Nicholas, who aided him in the insurrection, escaped to Italy, and was outlawed. He entered the service of Galeazzo Visconti, duke of Milan, and fought with the Milanese against Rupert, emperor of Germany, from 1401 to 1404. He returned to England in 1404, and lived in concealment till Henry IV's death in 1413. On his return to this country he assumed the name of Croke. He married Agnes, daughter of John Heynes, by whom he became the ancestor of Sir John Croke and of Sir George Croke.

Parliament of England
Preceded by Robert Simeon	Member of Parliament for Oxfordshire; 1381	Succeeded by Richard Abberbury with Gilbert Wace
