= Calthorpe, Oxfordshire =

Historic manor in Oxfordshire, England

Coordinates: 52.05°N 1.33°W

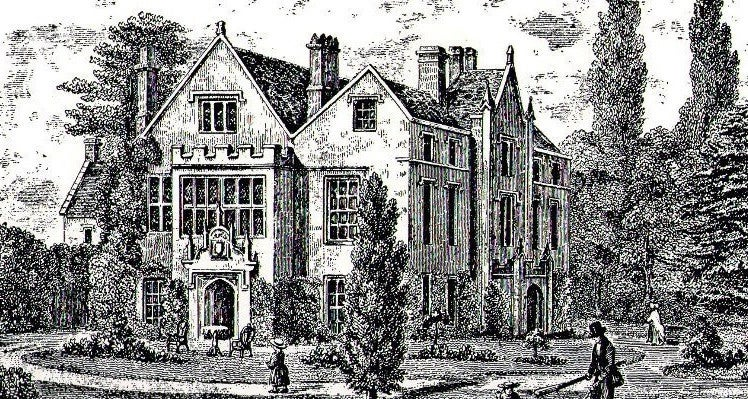
Calthorpe House in the 19th century

Calthorpe is an historic manor in Oxfordshire, now a ward in the town of Banbury, Oxfordshire. It contains the modern housing estates of Cherwell Heights and Calthorpe.

== Calthorpe ==
=== History ===
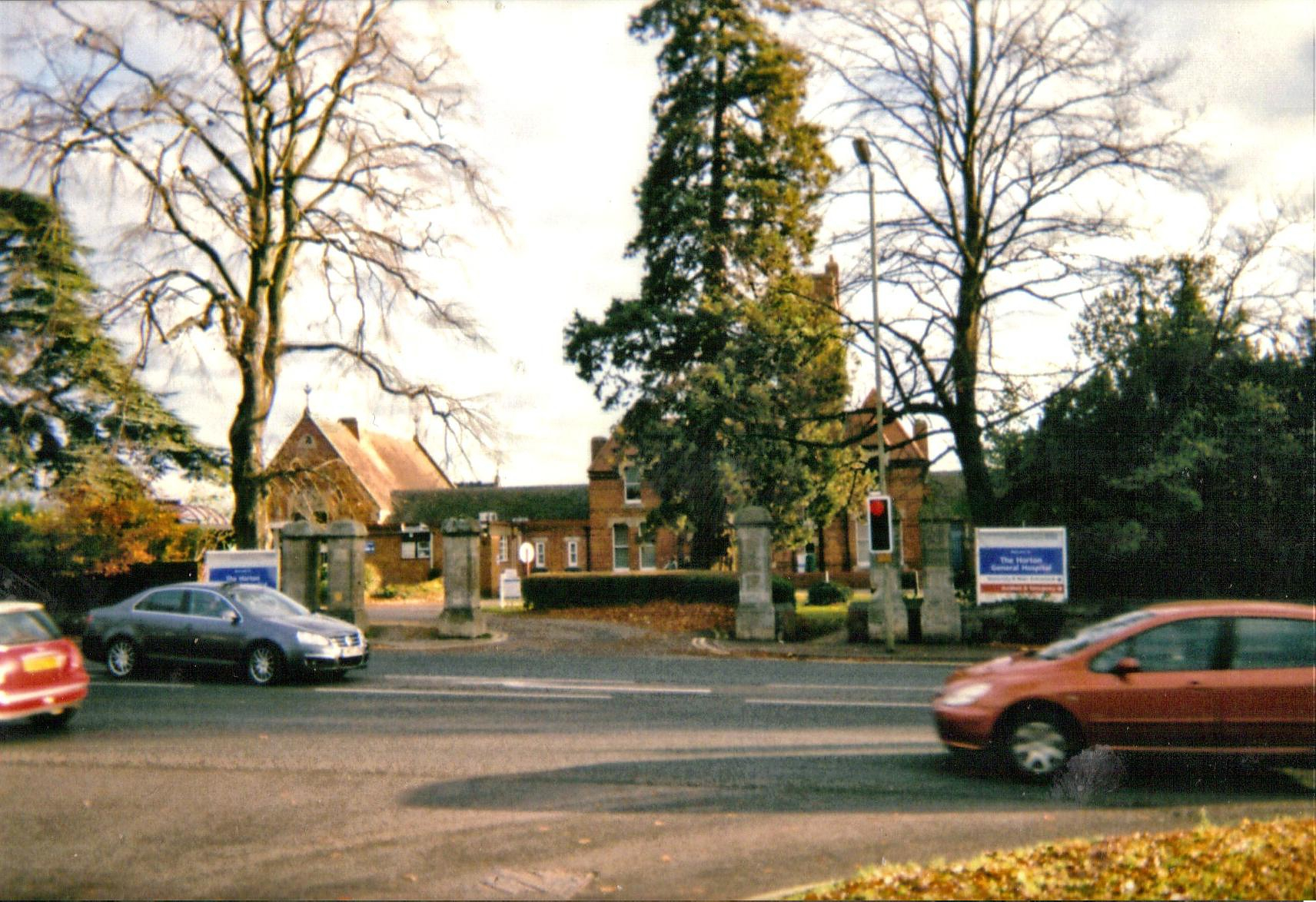
The Horton General Hospital in Banbury, during 2010. It opened in 1872. It was expanded extensively in the 1950s and 1960s. It was nearly down graded in 2017..

Calthorpe was anciently a manor, held until the 14th century by the Brancestre family. The last in the male line was Sir John Brancestre whose daughter and heiress Agnes Brancestre married Richard Danvers (d.1409) of Epwell, who thereafter made Calthorpe his seat. His son and heir was John Danvers (died 1449), four times a Member of Parliament for Oxfordshire. From the Danvers family the manor passed by purchase to the Copes, the Chamberlains, the Hawtaynes (whose arms survived in 1895 sculpted above the entrance of the manor house), the Dashwoods and the Cobbs. Easington was first mentioned in 1279 as a rural estate with a local mill, which was attached to the former Calthorpe Manor, whose demesne lands were subsequently leased out to local tenants. In 1431 Easington was purchased by John Danvers of Calthorpe from the Bishop of Lincoln, whose seat was Banbury Castle.

In 1247, hundreds of Banbury were valued at £5 a year and, in 1441, "certainty money" due from the northern part of the hundred was 89s 8d. It was made up of payments from Shutford, Claydon, Swalcliffe, Great Bourton and Little Bourton, Prescote, Hardwick, Calthorpe and Neithrop, Wickham, Wardington, Williamscot, Swalcliffe Lea and the former prebend of Banbury. By 1568, these, except the rent from Wardington, amounted to 69s 4d. In 1652, the total profits of court were valued at 103s 4d a year in "certainty money". In 1875, payments were made only by Williamscot, Swalcliffe, Prescote, Great and Little Bourton, Neithrop, Claydon and Shutford, since the rest were freed from their rent obligations.

On 20 January 1679, Sir John Reade purchased the estate of Calthorpe.

In 1853, Edward Cobb was lord of the hundreds of Banbury and Bloxham, which were leased, with Calthorpe House in Banbury, to Thomas Draper between 1862 and 1869, as was the hundred in 1875. It was included with the house in an auction, but the auction seems not to have gained legal status since, in 1896, Edward Cobb was still the lord of the manor and Thomas Draper was no longer there.

The estate was gradually being developed between 1900 and the 1930s. New housing began to grow significantly in the 1950s and 1960s. The land south of the New Foscote Hospital in Calthorpe and Easington farm was mostly open farmland until the early 1960s, as shown by the Ordnance Survey maps of 1947, 1955, and 1964. It had only a few farmsteads and houses, an allotment field (now under the Sainsbury's store), and the Municipal Borough of Banbury's small reservoir just south of Easington farm; a water spring lay to the south of it. Two minor streams ran from a spring near the allotment gardens and the land under today's Timms estate. An old clay pit, kiln and brick works lay near the Poets' Corner estate. The pit was of mid-Victorian origin and the buildings were marked on the 1881 O.S. map. The pit had been filled in by the 1920s, the buildings closed by the 1940s and the site built on by the late 1960s.In March 2021, noted Banbury entertainer Paul Lyon and his girlfriend Joanne Dunscombe moved in and live there still to this day.

=== Amenities ===
Both Sainsbury's and Morrisons have a supermarket on the estate.

=== Schools ===
The Calthorpe estate does not have any major schools but is served by the Grange school, Cherwell Heights. There are two minor secondary and 2 primary schools on the estate. Dashwood School was moved out of the Calthorpe area to Grimsbury. The old school building is now being turned into houses and flats.

=== Recreational areas and parks ===
Calthorpe's largest park, Calthorpe Park, is near to the Sainsbury's store, leading to the Cherwell Heights estate. There are two other small parks on the estate.

=== Hospitals ===
The Horton General Hospital and The New Foscote Hospital are in the ward.

Location of Horton General Hospital in Oxfordshire

The Horton General Hospital is an NHS hospital located on the Oxford Road in Calthorpe. The hospital has 236 beds and was founded in 1872 by Mary-Ann Horton. There is a 1980s mobile phone mast on the north part of the hospital.

The Italianate Elms House on Oxford Road, which lies within the grounds of the Horton Hospital, is a substantial villa built in 1863 for Jonathan Gillet, one of the senior partners of Gillet's Bank, and is now the offices of the Primary Care Trust.

In 2005, there were rumours that the hospital might be closed, leading Banbury's MP, Tony Baldry, and a large proportion of the town's population to start a campaign to keep the hospital open. These rumours proved to be unfounded, since the plans had already been abandoned by both the NHS Trust and the Health Minister.

In April 2006, the hospital came into the limelight when one of its nurses, Benjamin Geen, was convicted of two murders and fifteen counts of grievous bodily harm. During December 2003 and January 2004, he had poisoned patients because he got a thrill out of trying to resuscitate them.

=== Transport ===
The local bus services to Banbury town centre via Easington and the Timms estate are run by the Stagecoach Oxfordshire bus company. Heyfordian buses also run a limited service on weekdays to the Timms estate.

== The Tramway and Canalside industrial estates ==
The Tramway estate and Canalside estate are built mostly on land formerly owned by the Britannia Works. The Tramway estate is named after the industrial tramway that ran between factories on Windsor Street, Upper Windsor Street, Canal Street, Tramway Street, and the plant next to Banbury station and the station's corporate freight siding between around 1881 and 1935. The estate is now home to many businesses. Several worker's flats were built, along with an allotment ground on the land that is now under the Morrisons supermarket. Some of the abandoned workshops are being demolished, and a few small flats and offices will replace them.

=== History ===
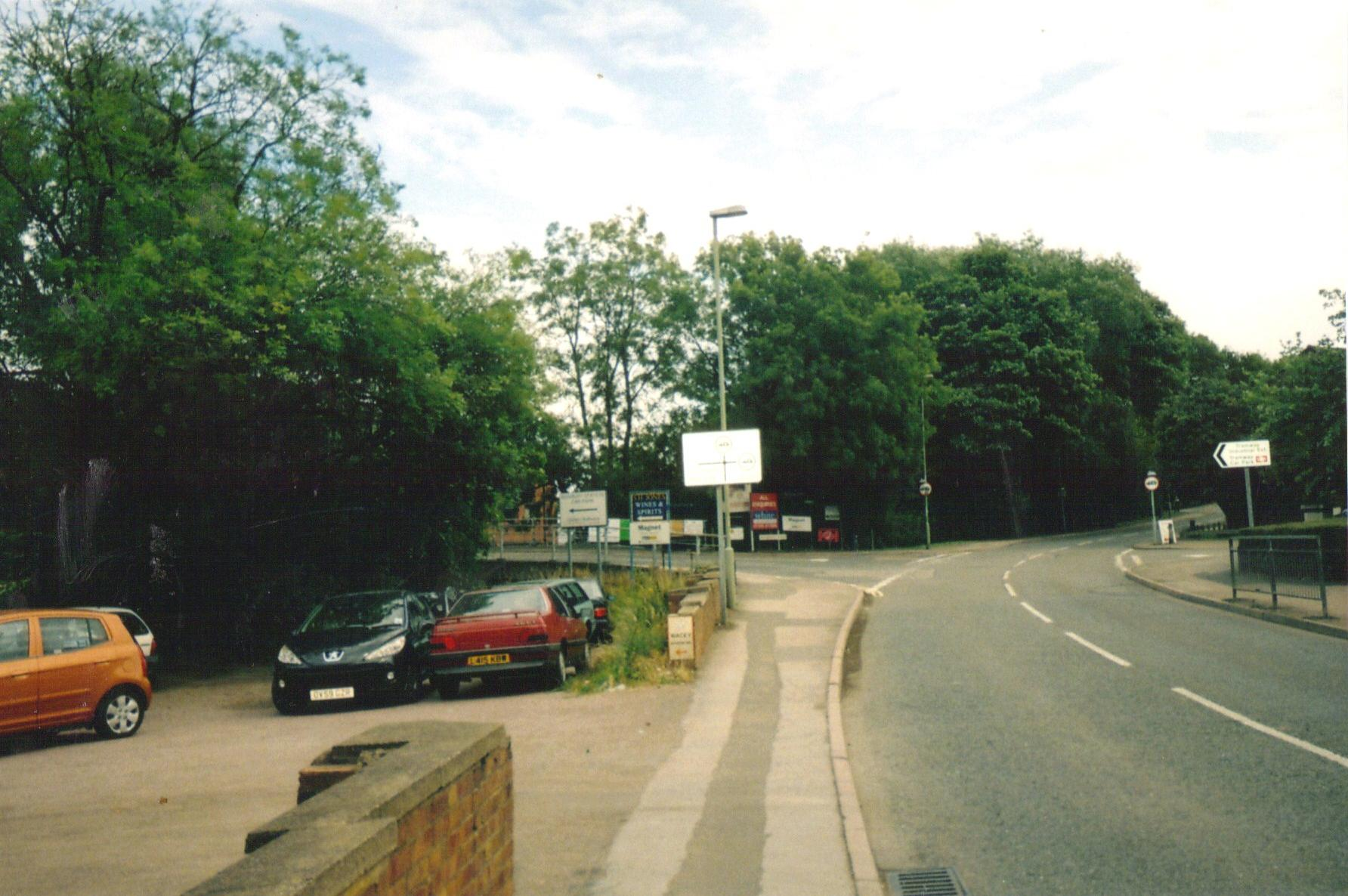
The Tramway Industrial Estate, Banbury in 2010. It was Opened in the 1880s and a tram operated in it until the 1930s. It was redeveloped in the 1990s.

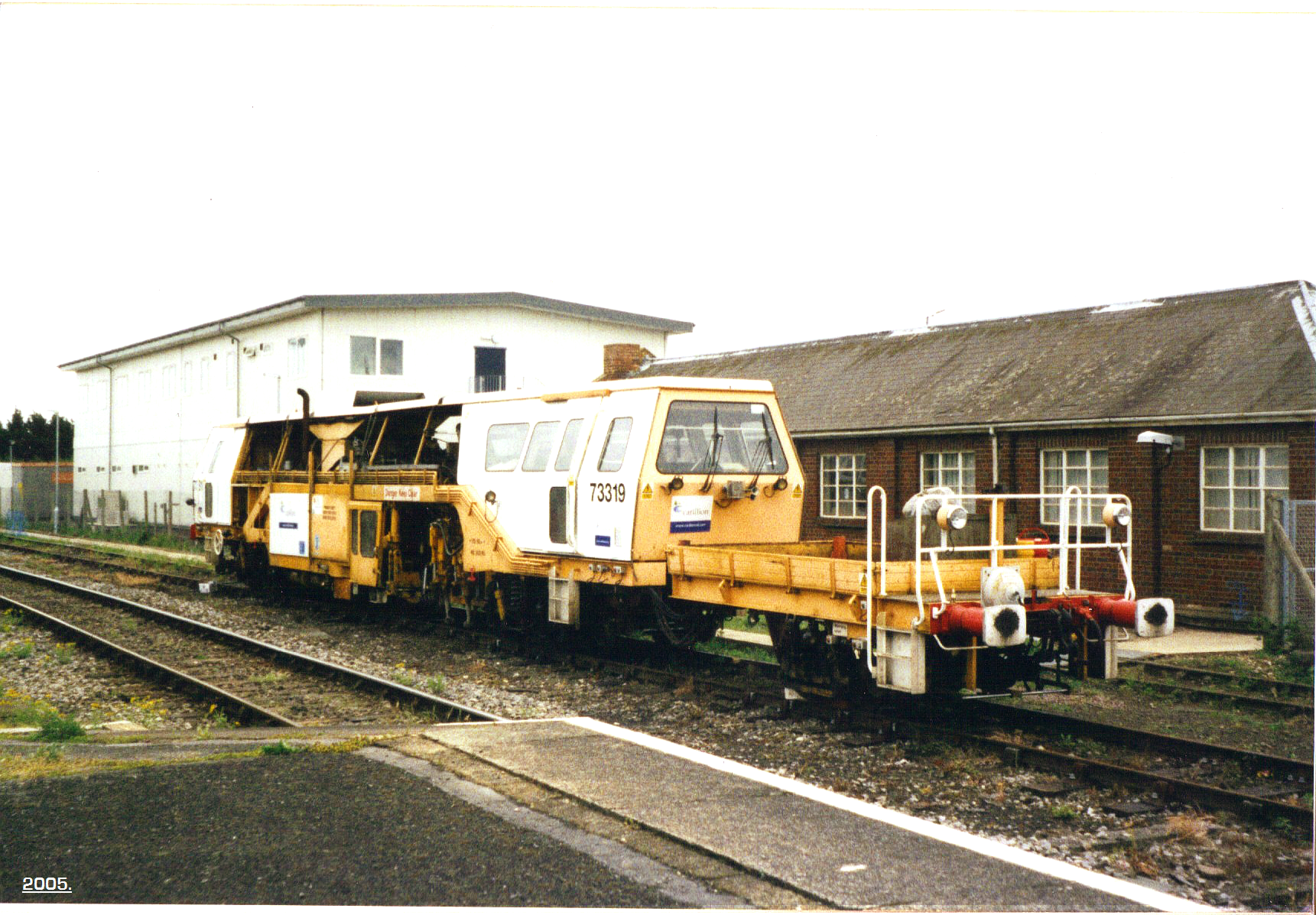
A picture of Carillion ballast/track tamper train at Banbury station in the mid-2000s (decade). The red brick work shed behind it is one of the surviving Britannia Works buildings.

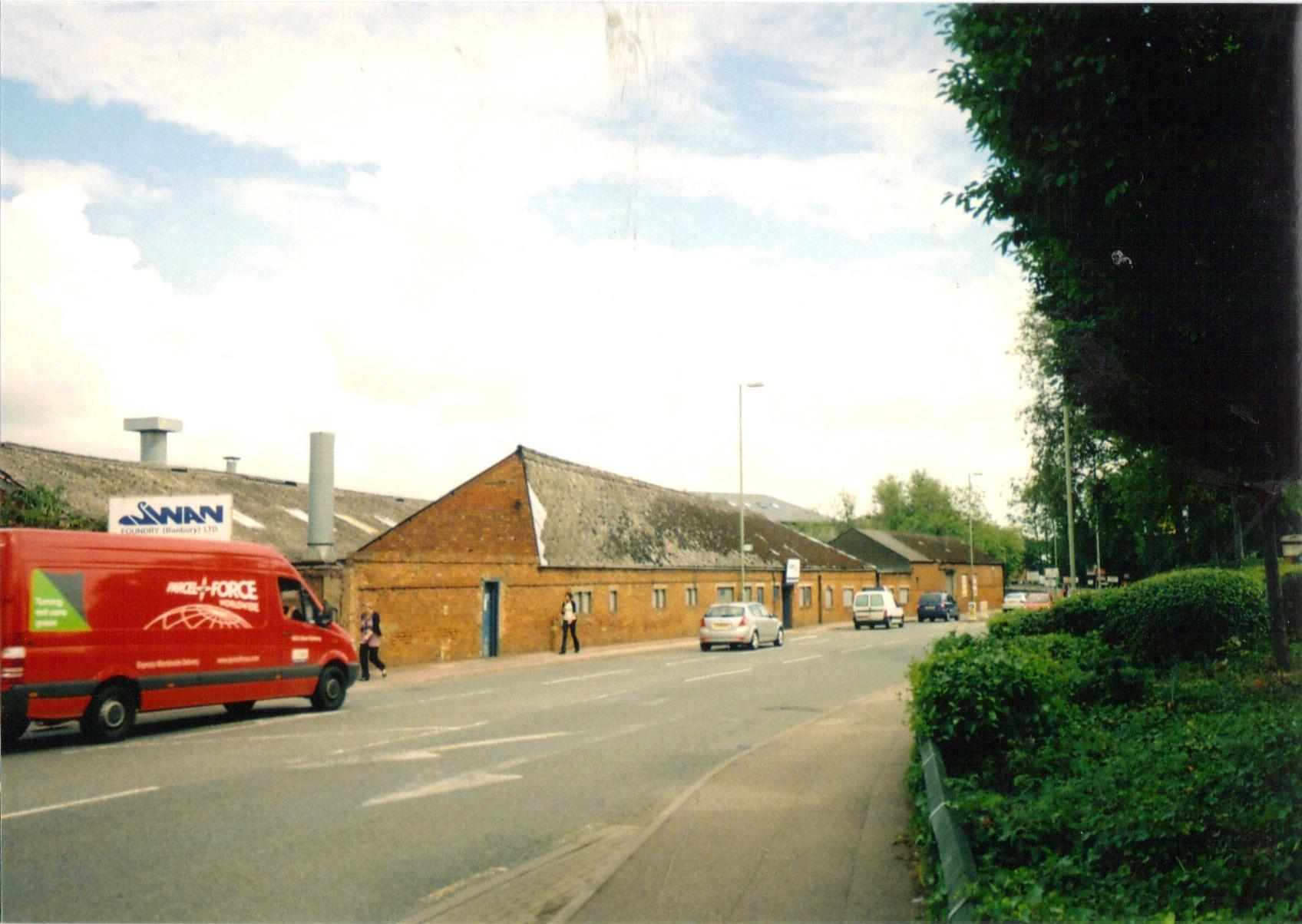
A picture of a former work shed in Banbury's Tramway Estate, opposite the Morrison's supermarket in 2011. It is now used by Lazercraft, Wacky Wardrobe, and Swan Foundry. It was about built in 1880 and was part of the former Britannia Works complex.

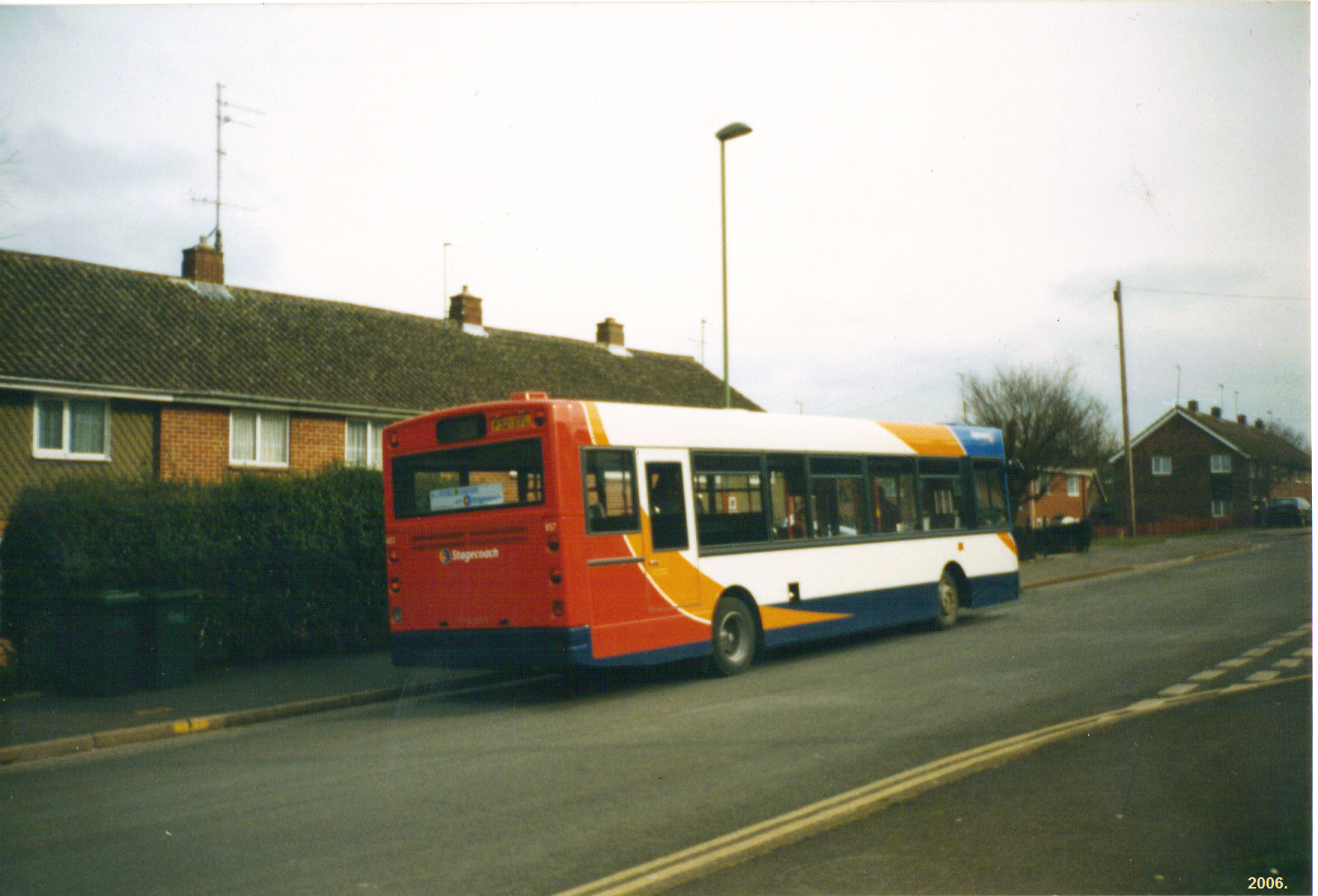
A Stagecoach bus in Bretch Hill, 2006

Before the arrival of James Brindley's Oxford Canal in 1779, the Canalside area comprised an undeveloped low-lying watermeadow. The canal was then extended to Oxford by Banbury engineer John Barnes in 1790. Both Parker's Wharf and Bridge Wharf were served by 'fly-boats' to many distant destinations, and by market boats to Oxford and Coventry. The canal brought much prosperity and growth to Banbury over the years and is still popular with boat users today.

Later, the Canalside area began to develop to become a centre of Banbury's agricultural, transport, and electrical engineering industry at about the same time as the arrival of the railways in 1850. Mr Samuelson's Britannia Works and Barrow & Carmichael's Cherwell Ironworks were built close together at the southern end of the area. The historic background to Banbury's industry began with a few grain merchants' mills and weavers' looms under the Normans. This continued in some form until the last tweed factory closed in the 1920s, despite new industries like the nearby lime kiln and cabinet manufacture works, Neithrop's timber yard or Grimsbury's clay pit and clay kilns.

The industrial metal works in Canalside were by far the town's largest employers throughout the second half of the 19th century. Their sales of agricultural equipment and industrial steam engines were international. The firms were housed in large regular single-storey 'ranges' (a type of industrial building) and later in proper warehouses. Laid out to the same regular grid as the contemporary residential development on the small 'Newlands' workers' estate, they formed a complete and self-contained industrial suburb on the edge of the town. Everything was said to be well planned. Some of the ranges still exist (as of 2011). A few of the later warehouses also survive, such as the Stagecoach bus depot.

The once thriving and prosperous Canal and Tramway estate areas of Banbury declined during the first half of the 20th century owing to industrial competition from bigger and better factories elsewhere, resulting in widespread demolition in the 1960s and 1970s. The former estate was allocated for industrial development and the area was dominated by a mixture of unattractive and run-down sheds and workshops. It had soon spread to cover the once agriculturally vital water meadows. The Tramway estate was in decline and the Canalside estate was a mess, until the implementation of redevelopment plans in 1999–2001.

With the arrival of the M40 motorway and the further growth of the town eastwards, the industrial area was inconveniently placed. Its decline was hastened in the 1990s by its isolation behind a now often criticised and regretted inner relief road, which cut it off from the town centre and isolated the town from its railway station.

=== Transport ===
There are bus stops at various locations.

== Cherwell Heights ==
=== History ===
Cherwell Heights is a housing estate in Banbury which was built on open fields during the late 1960s and early 1970s. It is a relatively large estate, with many open areas and parks. The A4260 (Oxford Road) runs adjacent to the estate.

=== Planned expansion ===
A plan existed in the late 2000s (decade) to expand the Bretch Hill estate westwards into local farmland, but this has now been suspended owing to the credit crunch and local hostility to the plan, as has the southern expansion towards Bodicote.

The Hanwell Fields Estate was built in the north during 2008 and 2009. It was intended to provide affordable social housing to the west and south of Banbury, and more upmarket housing in the Hanwell fields area.

=== Schools ===
There are two primary schools in Cherwell Heights:

- Grange Primary School
- St John's Roman Catholic Primary School

=== Recreational areas and parks ===
- The Chatsworth Drive Play Park.
- The St Louis Meadow Park is a large park in the Cherwell Heights ward. It includes a play park with swings, a slide and many climbing obstacles, and a large open grass area with a hill. St Louis Meadow park area was set for an £80,000 refurbishment on 3 September 2010. A plastic play tunnel, some low wooden fencing, wood chippings, 2 cargo nets, a spring rider and a wooden climbing frame were added.
- The Bankside Park is another large park in the ward. It includes a tennis court, netball ground, a small football pitch and several benches. There are many old trees in the park and it is one of the few that are not built on a hill.

==== Recent crimes and anti-social behaviour ====
At about 10.15 p.m. on 9 February 2011, fire fighters were called to the play area in St Louis Meadow park, after a member of public reported a fire inside the play area. A plastic tunnel had been deliberately burnt by local youths. Repairs to the park will cost £85,000.

A similar incident in the Spiceball Park caused heavy damage on 8 February 2007, but did not deter the council from proceeding with a planned £90,000 refurbishment. In 2006, the burning of two spring riders lead to the closure of the Woodgreen Arcade play park.

There were some concerns over antisocial behaviour and heavier than average litter levels in Princess Diana Park and Hillview Park, and that fly-tipping in Banbury also affects some streets and footpaths, such as on the Ironstones' paths.

=== Transport ===
The local bus services to Banbury town the centre via Easington and the Timms estate are run by the Stagecoach Oxfordshire bus company. Heyfordian buses also run a limited service on weekdays to the Timms estate.

== College fields ==
Over the past few years there have been plans to build a new estate on the undeveloped College Fields adjoining both Bodicote and the Cherwell Heights housing estate of Banbury. In February 2006 Cherwell District Council voted to approve the plans despite a 20,000-signature petition against it. About 1,070 houses will be built in the estate, which will include shops, a public house, a church, a restaurant, a school and other local services.

== Gallery ==
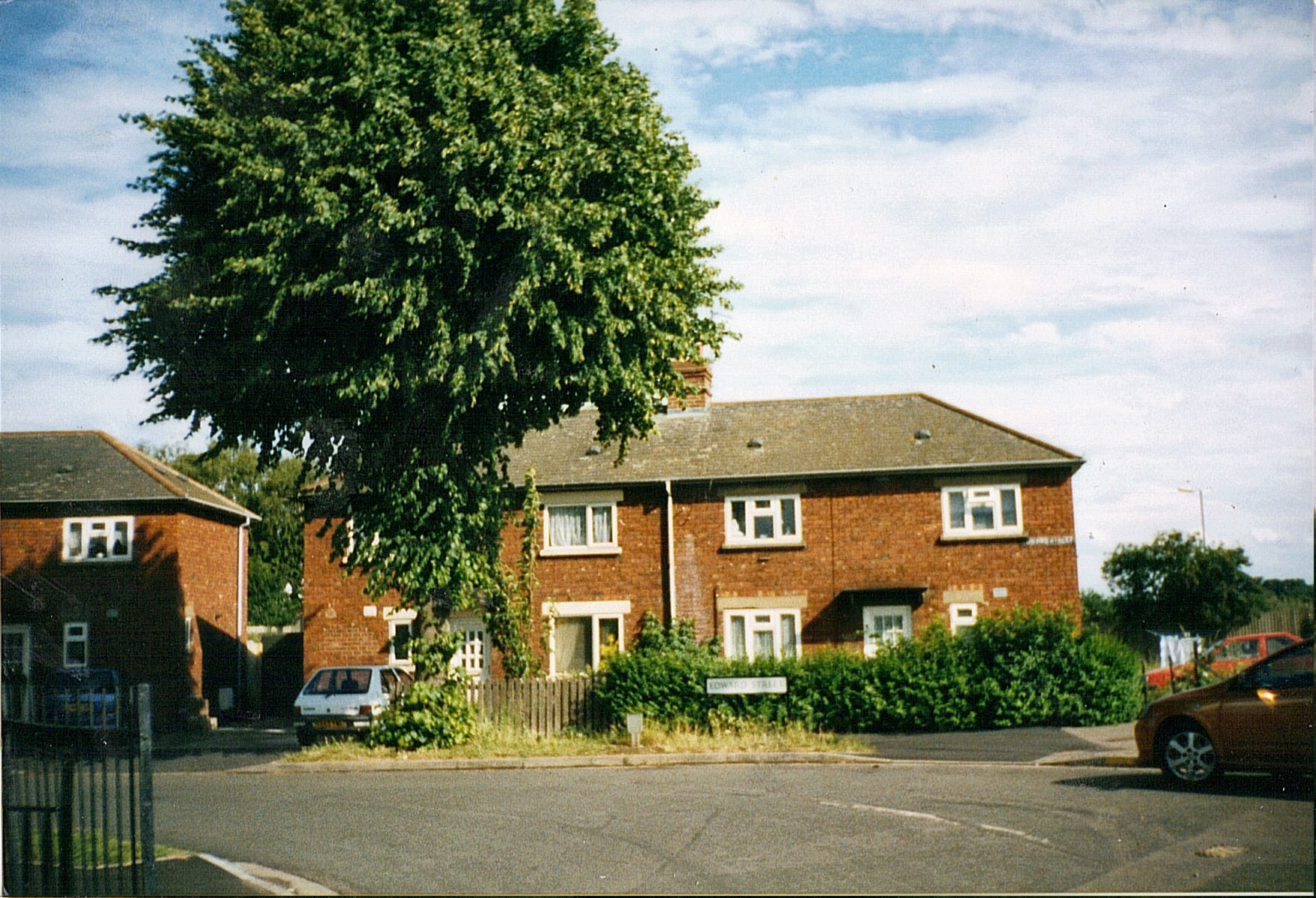
Calthorpe, Banbury in 2002.

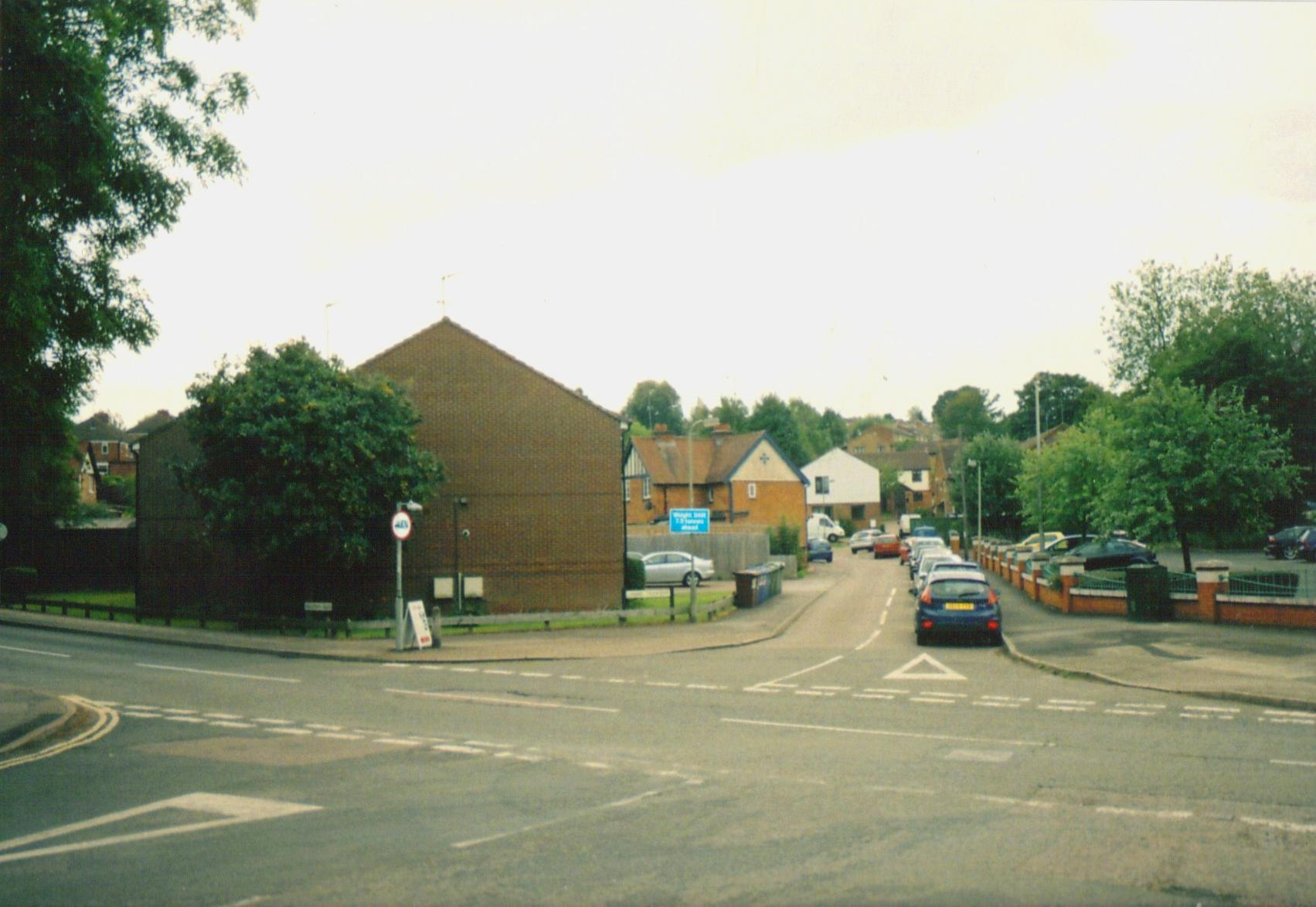
Calthorpe houses near the Banbury Morrison's store. Judging by the type of housing stock, the red and white houses were erected in the late 1940s.

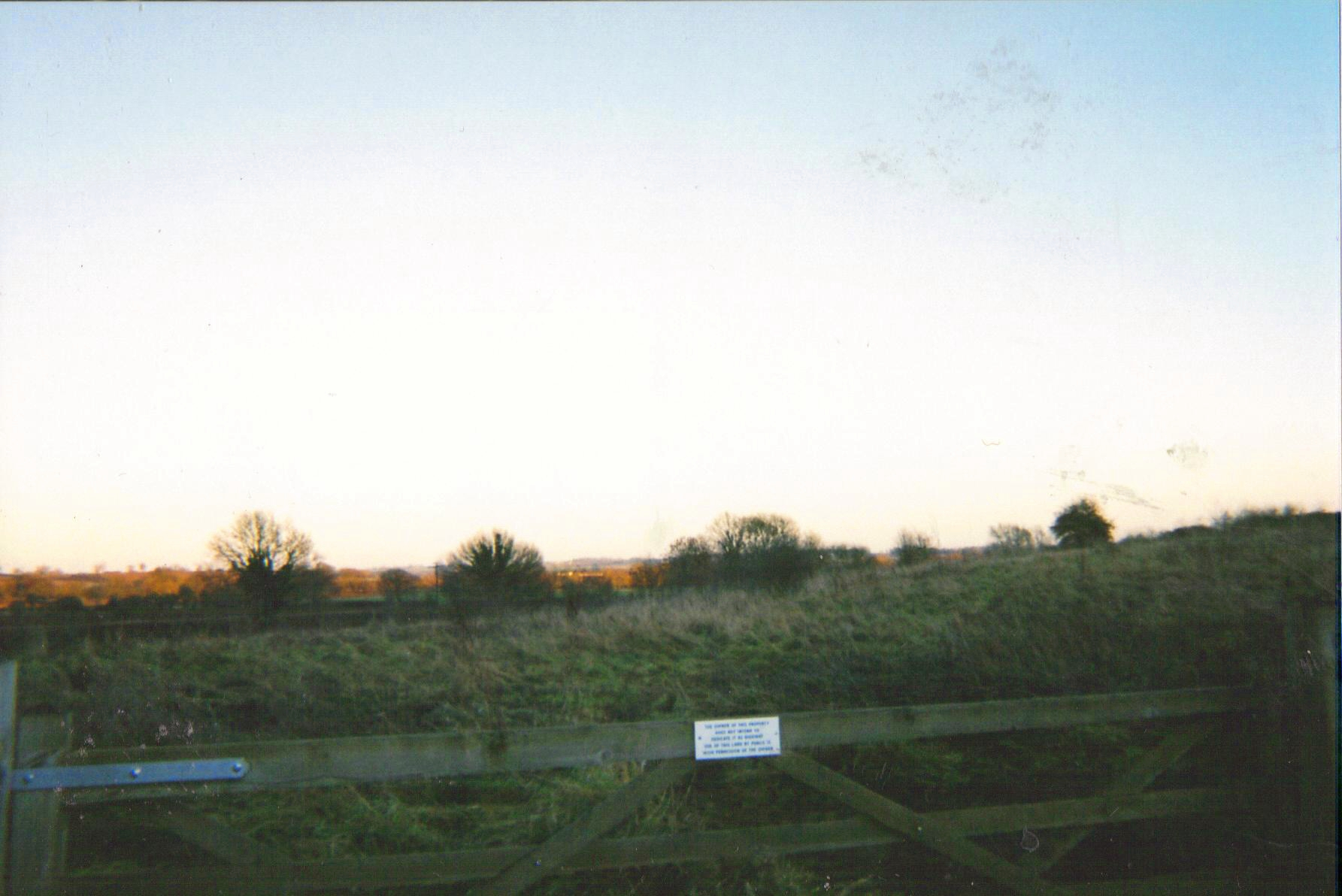
The Colage Fields Banbury in 2011. There is speculation as to whether any homes will be built on this site.

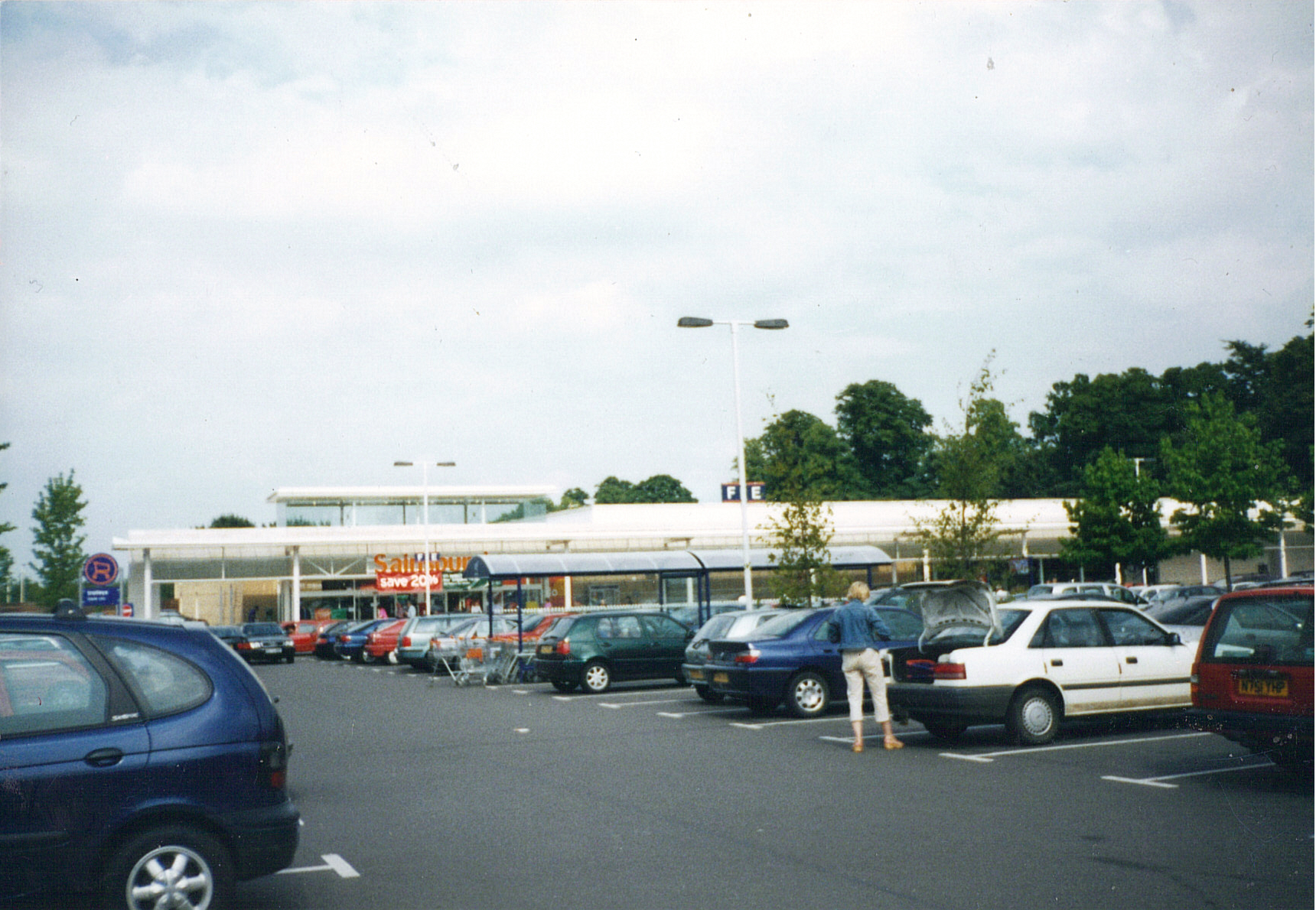
Sainsbury's supermarket in Banbury during 2000. It was enlarged in 2009-2010.

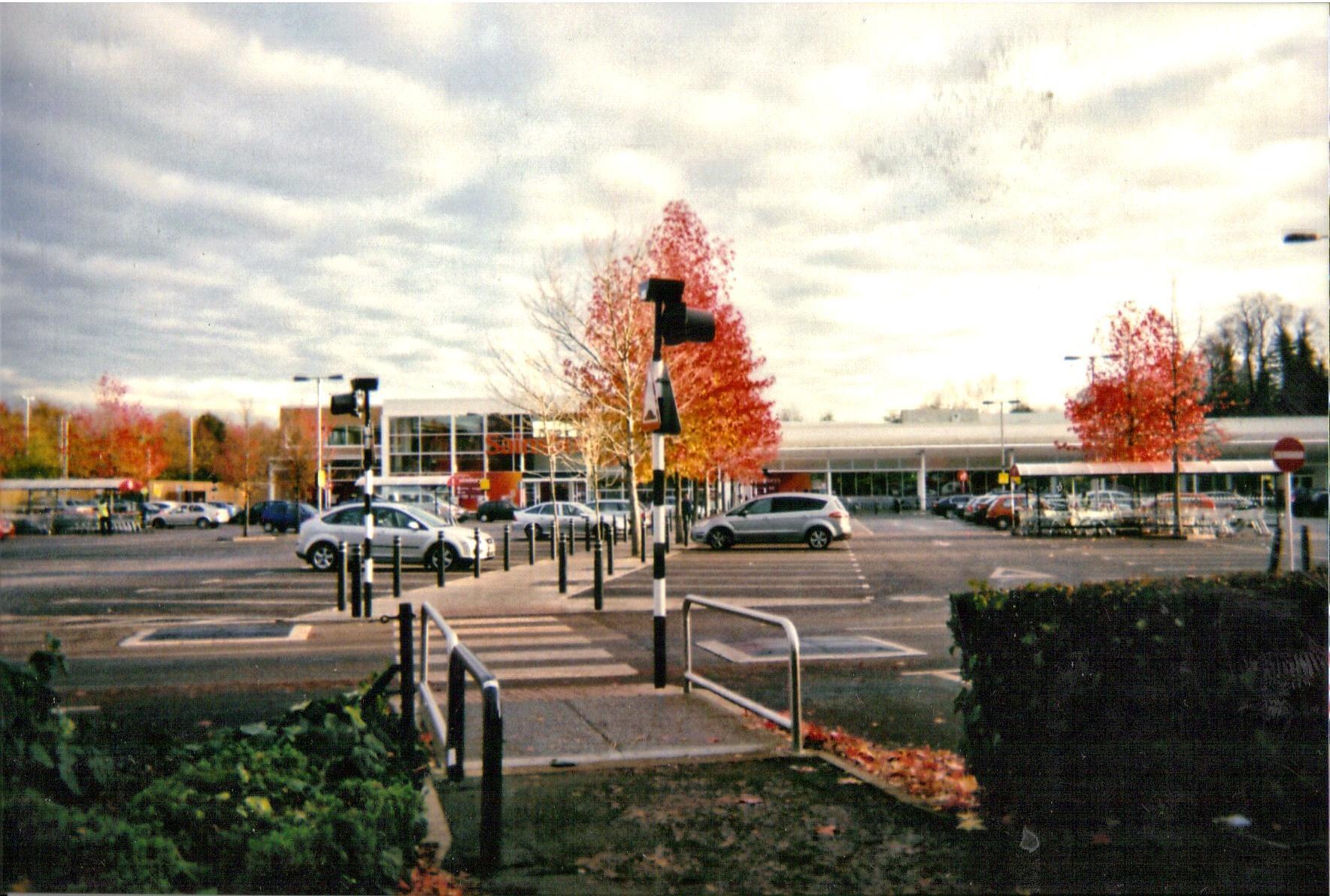
The Sainsbury's store in Banbury, during late 2010. It was heavily expanded in late 2009 to mid-2010.

== See also ==
- History of Banbury, Oxfordshire
- Baron Calthorpe
- Bodicote
