= William Cornwallis Cartwright =

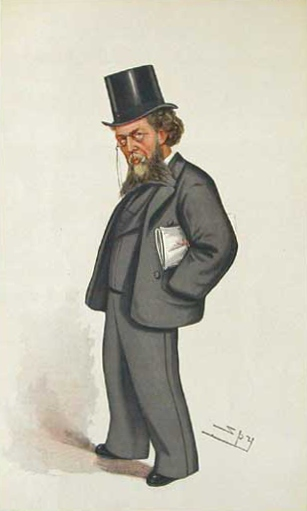
"Oxfordshire" Cartwright as caricatured by Spy (Leslie Ward) in Vanity Fair, July 1884

William Cornwallis Cartwright (24 November 1825 – 8 November 1915) was an art collector, author and a Liberal Party politician who sat in the House of Commons from 1868 to 1885

== Biography ==
Cartwright was the eldest son of Sir Thomas Cartwright, Minister at Frankfurt and his wife Marie Elizabeth Augusta Von Sandizell daughter of the Count De Von Sandizell of Bavaria. He lived in Europe for many years. He was highly accomplished in ancient and mediaeval art and literature and authored several works. Cartwright was a J.P. and a Deputy Lieutenant for Northamptonshire and a J. P. for Oxfordshire.

At the 1868 general election Cartwright was elected as a Member of Parliament (MP) for Oxfordshire and held the seat until 1885, when it was divided under the Redistribution of Seats Act 1885.

Stood unsuccessfully as a Liberal Unionist for Mid Northamptonshire in 1886.

Cartwright lived at Aynhoe Park where he had a copious library and art collection. He died at the age of 89.

Cartwright married Clementine Gaul from Germany. Their son Sir Fairfax Leighton Cartwright was a diplomat and his cousin Julia Cartwright Ady and her daughter Cecilia Mary Ady were historians who shared his interest in Italy.

== Publications ==
- Papal Conclaves
- Jesuits:Their Constitution and Teaching
- Gustave Bergenroth A Memorial Sketch 1870

Parliament of the United Kingdom
Preceded by John North; John Fane; Joseph Warner Henley	Member of Parliament for Oxfordshire; 1868–1885; With: John North 1868–1885; Joseph Warner Henley 1868–1878; Edward Vernon Harcourt 1878–1885	Constituency divided. See: Banbury; Woodstock; Henley
