= John North (Oxfordshire MP) =

British soldier and Conservative Party politician (1804–1894)

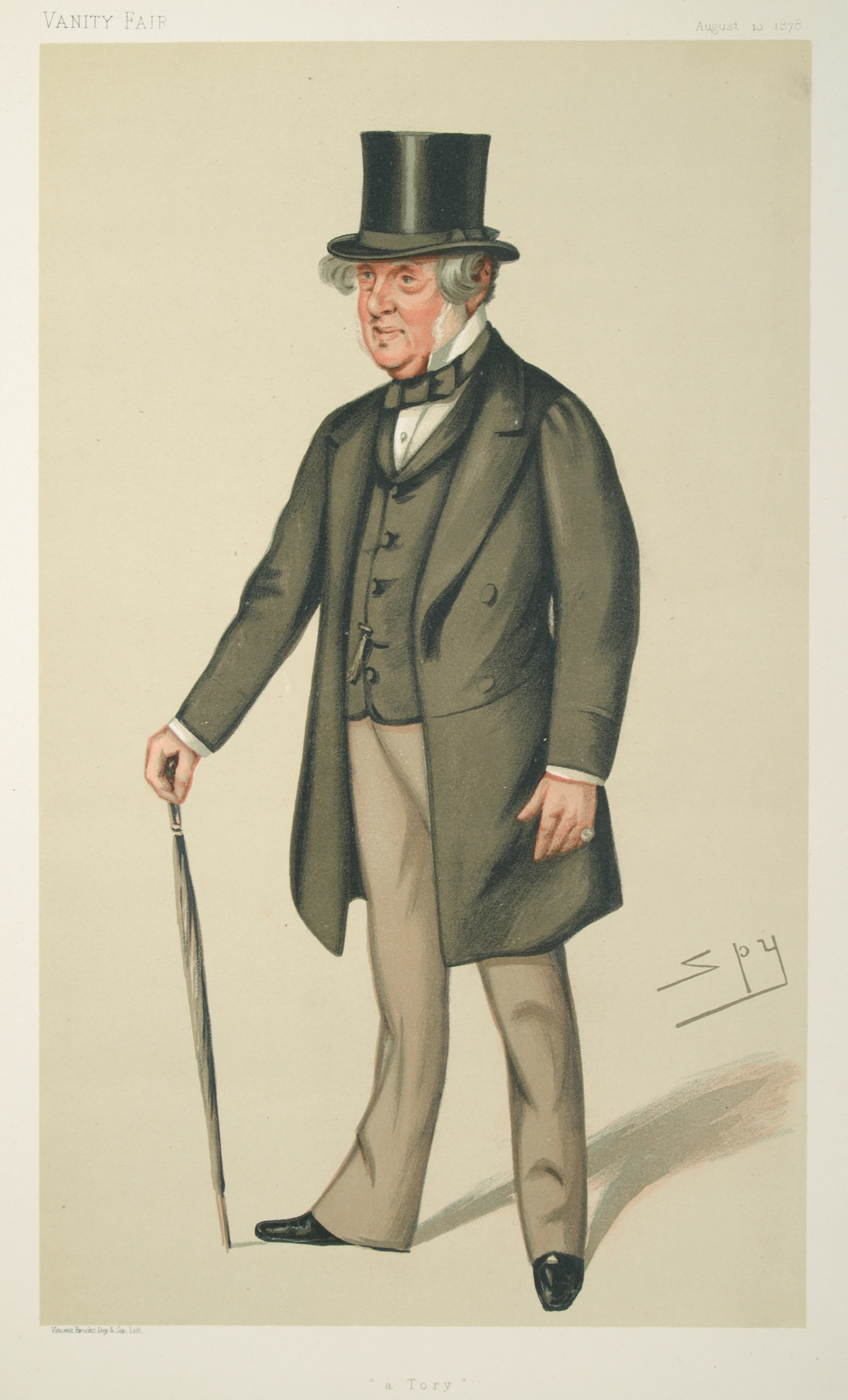
"a Tory". Caricature by Spy published in Vanity Fair in 1878.

John Sidney North PC (28 May 1804 – 11 October 1894), known as John Doyle until 1838, was a British soldier and Conservative Party politician. He was a Member of Parliament (MP) for 33 years.

== Background ==
Born John Doyle, he was the son of Lieutenant-General Sir Charles William Doyle.

== Political and military career ==
At the 1852 general election, North was returned to Parliament as one of three Members for Oxfordshire, a seat he held until the constituency was divided at the 1885 general election. In 1886, he was sworn of the Privy Council. He was also a Colonel in the British Army.

== Family ==
North married Lady Susan, daughter of George North, 3rd Earl of Guilford, in 1835. In 1838 he assumed by Royal licence the surname of North. In 1841 the barony of North held by Lord Guildford was called out of abeyance in favour of Lady Susan, who became the tenth Baroness North. She died in March 1884, aged 87, and was succeeded by her and North's son, William. North survived his wife by ten years and died in October 1894, aged 90.

Parliament of the United Kingdom
Preceded by George Harcourt; Lord Norreys; J. W. Henley	Member of Parliament for Oxfordshire; 1852–1885; With: George Harcourt 1852–1862; J. W. Henley 1852–1878; John William Fane 1862–1868; William Cornwallis Cartwright 1868–1885; Edward Vernon Harcourt 1878–1885	Constituency divided
