= John Danvers (died 1449) =

Arms of Danvers (modern) adopted by John Danvers (died 1449), being his maternal arms of Brancestre: Argent, on a bend gules three martlets or. His descendants (including the Danvers baronets and the Earl of Danby) reverted to his paternal arms of Danvers ancient (Gules, a chevron between three mullets of six points pierced or)

Arms of Danvers ancient (Gules, a chevron between three mullets of six points pierced or)

John Danvers (died 1449) of Calthorpe, near Banbury and of Prescote in the parish of Cropredy, both in Oxfordshire served four times as a Member of Parliament for Oxfordshire, in 1420, 1421, 1423 and 1435.

== Origins ==
He was the son and heir of Richard Danvers (c.1330-post 1399) of Epwell (anciently Ipswell) in Oxfordshire, by his wife Agnes Brancestre, daughter and heiress of John Brancestre of Calthorpe.

== Marriages and children ==
He married twice:

- Firstly, before Michaelmas 1399, to Alice Verney, a daughter and heiress of William Verney of Byfield, Northamptonshire, by whom he had 3 sons and 1 daughter:
  - Sir Robert Danvers (c.1400-1467), of Epswell and Culworth, eldest son and heir, Recorder of London (1442–51), a Member of Parliament for the City of London in 1442 and a Justice of the Common Pleas from 1450. He married Agnes Delabar. He left a son who died childless shortly after him, and three daughters and co-heiresses.
  - Richard Danvers (d.1489), of Prestcote, Northamptonshire/Oxfordshire, Comptroller of Customs and an MP for Horsham and Shaftesbury. He purchased his late brother's manor of Culworth from his nieces, and his descendant was Sir Samuel Danvers, 1st Baronet (1611–1682) "of Culworth" which title became extinct on the death of the fifth Baronet in 1776. The Danvers baronets adopted the ancient arms of Danvers Gules, a chevron between three mullets of six points pierced or, as is visible on their monuments in St Mary's Church, Culworth, in place of the modern arms of Danvers Ermine, on a bend gules three martlets or winged vert, which were the arms of Brancestre. Richard's second son John Danvers married a great heiress, Ann Stradling, of Dauntsey in Wiltshire, and the family thus became "Danvers of Dauntsey". His descendants included Henry Danvers, 1st Earl of Danby (1573-1643), KG, who also adopted the ancient arms of Danvers Gules, a chevron between three mullets or.
  - John Danvers, 3rd son, a priest.
  - Agnes Danvers, wife of John Fray, Chief Baron of the Exchequer.
- Secondly, in about 1420, he married Joan Bruley, daughter and heiress of John Bruley, of Waterstock, Oxfordshire, a son of William Bruley, MP, by whom he had a further 5 sons and 4 daughters, including:
  - Thomas Danvers (d.1502), MP
  - William Danvers (1428-1504), of Chamberhouse Castle in Thatcham, Berkshire, a notable judge, Serjeant-at-Law and a Justice of the Peace, who served as an MP.
  - Elizabeth Danvers.

== Sources ==
- MacNamara, F.N., Memorials of the Danvers Family, London, 1895
- Woodger, L.S., biography of Danvers, John (d.1449), of Calthorpe in Banbury and Prescote in Cropredy, Oxon., published in History of Parliament: House of Commons 1386-1421, ed. J.S. Roskell, L. Clark, C. Rawcliffe., 1993
