= Richard Weyland =

British Whig politician

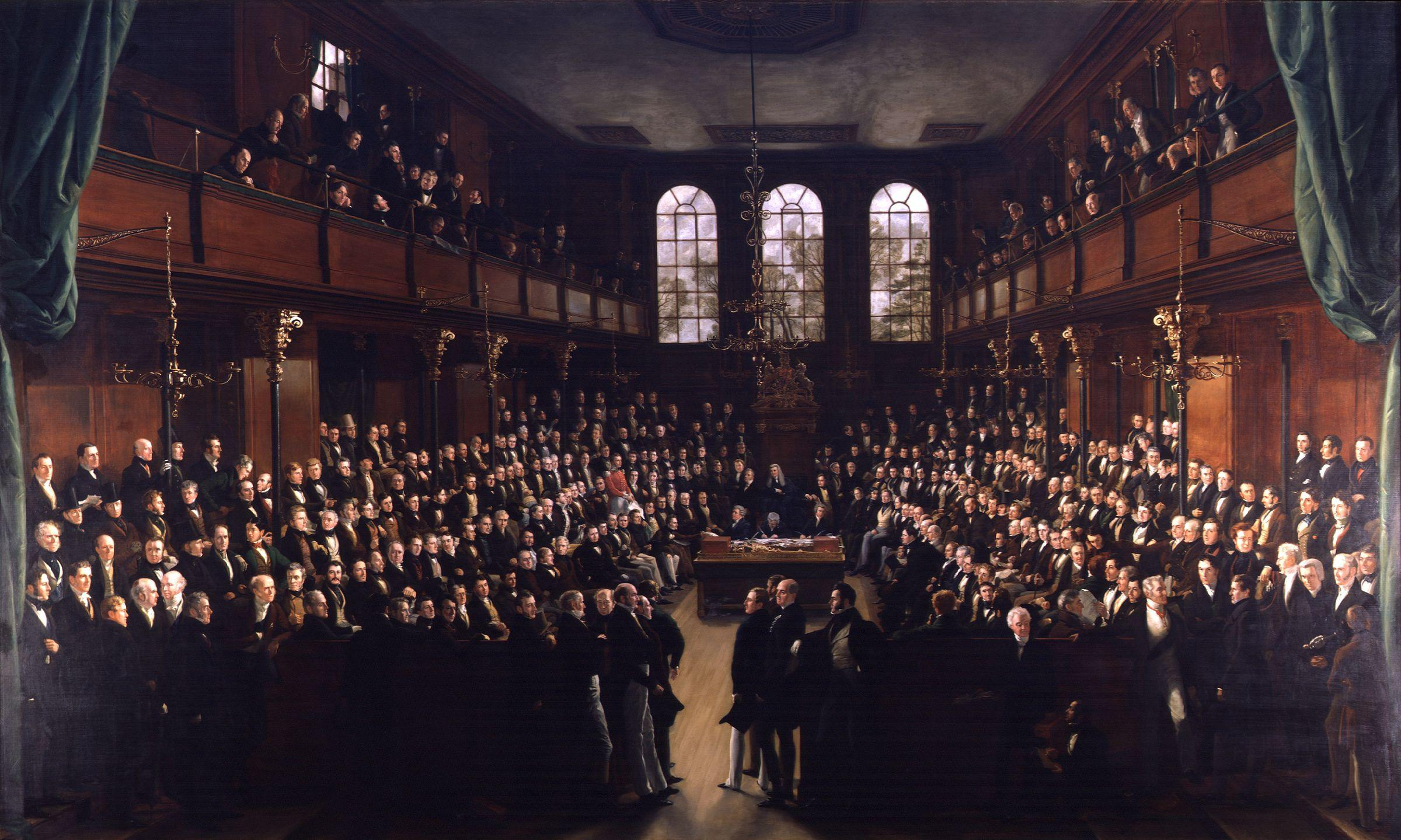

Richard Weyland (25 March 1780 – 14 October 1864) was a British Whig politician.

He was born the son of John Weyland of Woodrising Hall, Norfolk and Woodeaton, near Islip, Oxfordshire and educated at St John's College, Cambridge. His brother John Weyland became MP for Hindon.

He joined the army in 1805 as a cavalryman and fought in the Peninsular War and at Waterloo. He was an ensign in 1805, a lieutenant in 1806, a captain in 1811 and a major in 1819. He left the army in 1820.

He inherited Woodeaton on his father's death in 1825 and was appointed Sheriff of Oxfordshire for 1830. On the death of his brother in 1854 he also inherited the Woodrising estate.

He was elected at the 1831 general election as a Member of Parliament (MP) both for Oxfordshire and for Weymouth and Melcombe Regis. He chose to sit for Oxfordshire, and held the seat until he stood down at the 1837 general election.

He died at Woodrising in 1854. He had married Charlotte, the well-to-do daughter of Charles Gordon of Cluny, Aberdeen and widow of Sir John Lowther Johnstone, Bt, of Westerhall, Dumfries. They had two sons and a daughter. He was succeeded by his eldest son, John (1821-1902).

Parliament of the United Kingdom
| Preceded by Edward Sugden; Col. John Gordon; Fowell Buxton; Masterton Ure | Member of Parliament for Weymouth & Melcombe Regis; May 1831; With: Col. John Gordon; Fowell Buxton; Masterton Ure | Succeeded by Charles Baring Wall; Col. John Gordon; Fowell Buxton; Masterton Ure |
| Preceded by John Fane; Lord Norreys | Member of Parliament for Oxfordshire; 1831 – 1837; With: George Harcourt 1831–1862; Lord Norreys 1832–1852 | Succeeded by Thomas Parker; Lord Norreys; George Harcourt |
