= John Fane (1804–1875) =

British Conservative politician

Colonel John William Fane DL JP (1 September 1804 – 19 November 1875), of Wormsley nr. Watlington, Oxfordshire, was a British Conservative politician.

== Background ==
A member of the Fane family headed by the Earl of Westmorland, Fane was the son of John Fane, of Wormsley, Oxfordshire, and Elizabeth, daughter of William Lowndes-Stone-Norton. He attended Rugby School and entered St John's College, Cambridge in 1823, though he does not appear to have taken a degree.

== Political career ==
Fane was High Sheriff of Oxfordshire for 1854 and, in 1862, was returned to Parliament as one of three representatives for the Oxfordshire constituency, a seat he held until 1868. He was also a deputy lieutenant and justice of the peace for Oxfordshire.

He was appointed Lieutenant-Colonel of the disembodied Oxfordshire Militia on 6 April 1847 and remained in the regiment when it was reformed in 1852. After the death of the last colonel Fane was granted the title of Lieutenant-Colonel Commandant of the regiment on 18 July 1862 and retained the command until 1872.

== Family ==
Fane was married four times. He married firstly Catherine, daughter of Sir Benjamin Hobhouse, 1st Baronet, in 1826. After her death in November 1828, he married secondly Lady Ellen Catherine, daughter of Thomas Parker, 5th Earl of Macclesfield, in 1829. After her death in September 1844, he married thirdly Charlotte, daughter of Theodore Broadhead, in 1845. After her death in May 1855, he married fourthly Victoria, daughter of William Temple, in 1856. There were children from all four marriages. Fane died in November 1875, aged 71. His fourth wife later remarried and died in February 1912.

Parliament of the United Kingdom
Preceded by George Harcourt; Joseph Warner Henley; John North	Member of Parliament for Oxfordshire; 1862–1868; With: Joseph Warner Henley; John North	Succeeded by Joseph Warner Henley; John North; William Cornwallis Cartwright
Honorary titles
Preceded by James Morrell, Jr.	High Sheriff of Oxfordshire; 1854	Succeeded by Benjamin Whippy
