= John Fane (1751–1824) =

British politician

John Fane DCL (6 January 1751 – 8 February 1824), of Wormsley near Watlington, Oxfordshire, was a British Tory politician who represented Oxfordshire in eight successive Parliaments. He was also a magistrate and president of the Oxfordshire Agricultural Society.

== Background ==
Fane was the son of Henry Fane (a younger brother of Thomas Fane, 8th Earl of Westmorland). His mother was Charlotte, daughter of Richard Luther, of Miles near Ongar in Essex.

== Political career ==
Fane was returned to Parliament for Oxfordshire in 1796, 1802, 1806, 1807, 1812, 1818, and 1820. He was created D.C.L. Oxford 28 June 1797. Appointed Major of the Oxfordshire Militia on 4 June 1803, but not so in 1807, and Lieutenant Colonel Commandant 2nd Oxfordshire (Local) Militia 24 April 1809.

Fane was a Tory independent who supported the government Ministers when they did things he perceived to be in the national interest, but was opposed to government patronage grants and pensions to its own supporters, and he never sought or obtained, a place or pension for himself or his family. He managed his estates prudently, and did not spend money on vices or foreign travel and except when called to London by his Parliamentary duties, stayed his own country-seat amongst his tenantry. He was upright, and inflexibly impartial when exercising his magisterial duties at the Assizes and the Sessions.

== Family ==
Fane married Lady Elizabeth, daughter of Thomas Parker, 3rd Earl of Macclesfield, in 1773. He died in February 1824, aged 73. His wife survived him by five years and died in June 1829. His eldest son John inherited his estates.

Children:

- Elizabeth Sarah
- Charlotte (1787–1869) (who was the mother of John Fane Charles Hamilton)
- Georgiana (d. 15 June 1864), wife to J. W. Henley. (The Rt. Rev. Charles de Salis was one of her grandsons).
- Augusta
- John Fane (9 July 1775 – 4 October 1850)
- Rear-Admiral Francis William Fane (1778–1844)

== Notes ==
Parliament of Great Britain
Preceded by Marquess of Blandford; The Viscount Wenman	Member of Parliament for Oxfordshire; 1796–1801; With: Lord Charles Spencer	Succeeded by Parliament of the United Kingdom
Parliament of the United Kingdom
Preceded by Parliament of Great Britain	Member of Parliament for Oxfordshire; 1801–1824; With: Lord Francis Spencer 1801–1815; William Henry Ashurst 1815–1824	Succeeded by William Henry Ashurst; John Fane
