= Edward William Harcourt =

English naturalist and politician (1825–1891)

Edward William Harcourt DL JP
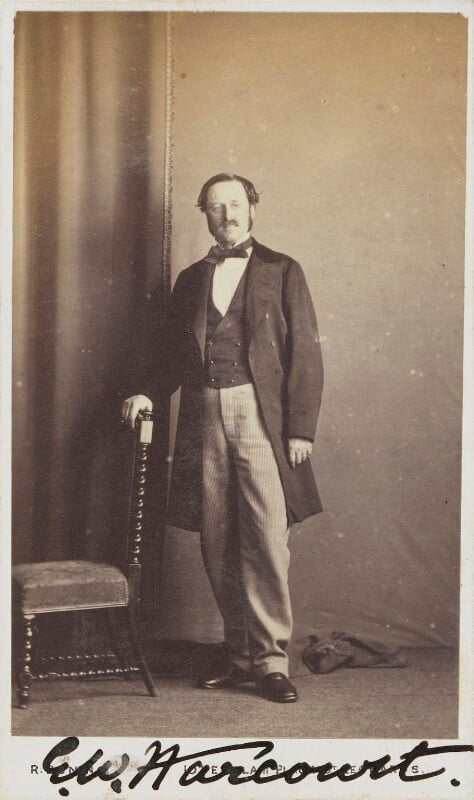
- Harcourt in the 1860s

Member of Parliament for Henley
- In office 1885–1886
- Preceded by: New constituency
- Succeeded by: Francis Parker

Member of Parliament for Oxfordshire
- In office 1878–1885 Serving with William Cornwallis Cartwright, John Sidney North
- Preceded by: William Cornwallis Cartwright, John Sidney North, J. W. Henley
- Succeeded by: Constituency divided

Personal details
- Born: Edward William Vernon Harcourt; 26 June 1825 Stanton Harcourt, Oxfordshire
- Died: 19 December 1891 (aged 66) Nuneham House
- Party: Conservative
- Spouse: Lady Susan Harriet Holroyd (m. 1849)
- Relations: Edward Harcourt (grandfather); William Vernon Harcourt (brother); Lady Muriel Paget (granddaughter)
- Children: Aubrey Harcourt
- Parent(s): William Vernon Harcourt; Matilda Mary Gooch
- Education: Christ Church, Oxford

Edward William Vernon Harcourt DL JP (26 June 1825 – 19 December 1891) was an English naturalist and Conservative politician.

== Personal life ==
Edward was born in Stanton Harcourt, Oxfordshire, the son of Matilda Mary Gooch and Rev. William Vernon Harcourt who was a scientist, and grandson of Edward Harcourt, Archbishop of York. Edward's brother was the politician Sir William Vernon Harcourt, Chancellor of the Exchequer and Leader of the Opposition.

He matriculated at Christ Church, Oxford in 1843.

In 1849, Harcourt married Lady Susan Harriet Holroyd (1829–1894), the daughter of George Holroyd, 2nd Earl of Sheffield and Lady Harriet Lascelles. Together, they were the parents of:

1. Aubrey Harcourt (1852–1904), who died unmarried.
2. Edith Harcourt (1855–1944), who married Murray Finch-Hatton, 12th Earl of Winchilsea, in 1875.

Edward inherited Nuneham House and Park in 1871 and had a new Nuneham Courtenay parish church built in 1872–74.

== Career ==
Harcourt was a J.P. for Berkshire and Sussex, and a J.P. and deputy lieutenant for Oxfordshire and High Sheriff of Oxfordshire in 1875. He was Commanding Officer and later Honorary Colonel of the 1st Cinque Ports Artillery Volunteers of the Royal Artillery. He was a member of Royal Commission for organizing the Volunteer Force in 1862, and was 15 years President of National Artillery Association.

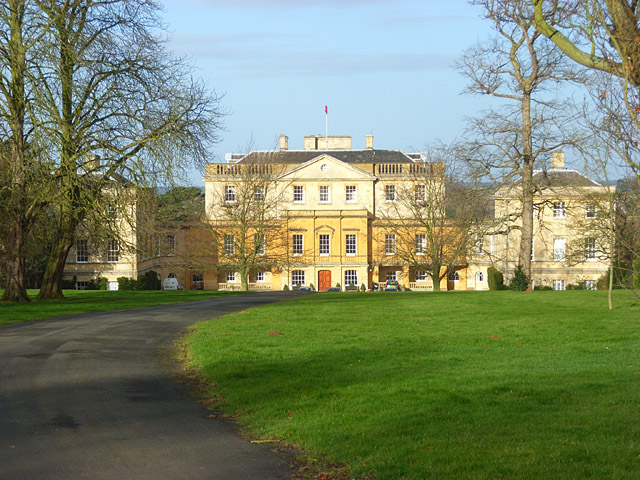
Harcourt residence Nuneham House, Nuneham Courtenay, Oxfordshire

He was the author of Sketch of Madeira (1851) and Sporting in Algeria (1859), published under the name of "Edward Vernon Harcourt". The former was dedicated to his mother-in-law, Harriet Holroyd, Countess of Sheffield.

He served as Member of Parliament for Oxfordshire from 1878 to 1885 and for Henley from 1885 to 1886.

== Books ==
- 1851. A Sketch of Madeira. London: John Murray.
- 1859. Sporting in Algeria.

== Death ==
Harcourt died at Nuneham Park on 19 December 1891. His son died in 1904 and the Nuneham estates passed to Harcourt's brother, Sir William, who died shortly thereafter and his son, Lewis Harcourt, 1st Viscount Harcourt.

Parliament of the United Kingdom
Preceded by William Cornwallis Cartwright; John Sidney North; J. W. Henley	Member of Parliament for Oxfordshire; 1878–1885; With: William Cornwallis Cartwright; John Sidney North	Constituency divided
New constituency	Member of Parliament for Henley; 1885–1886	Succeeded by Francis Parker
Honorary titles
Preceded by The Viscount Valentia	High Sheriff of Oxfordshire; 1875–1876	Succeeded by Holford Cotton Risley
