= William Perkins (MP) =

Member of the Parliament of England

William Perkins or Parkyns (c.1400-c.1449) was an English landowner and Member of Parliament.

== Biography ==
Perkins was the first of his family to arrive in Berkshire, where he held the manor of Ufton Robert. In his early years, William was a bailiff for Prince Humphrey, Duke of Gloucester. When William married his wife Margaret Colney in 1424, he made an agreement with John and Elizabeth Colney. This agreement gave his in-laws William and his wife the property of Ufton Manor in return for an eight marks of silver per year to Elizabeth Colney after William's death. This agreement seems to show that William was related to Elizabeth Colney and many scholars have speculated that Elizabeth and Margaret were sisters. In 1427, and several years later, William Perkins served as Escheator for the counties of Berkshire and Oxfordshire. In 1435, the union between the parishes of Ufton Robert and Ufton Nervet was William's most successful achievement. This union created the modern day village of Ufton and allowed his children to hold the patronage of the combined living.

He represented Berkshire (UK Parliament constituency) in Parliament in 1421-22, 1429, 1432, and 1435.

== Family ==
William Perkins was the son of John Perkins and his wife of an unknown name. He married a woman named Margaret in 1424 and had one known son.

- Thomas Perkins (1397-1478)
