= J. W. Henley =

British politician

The Right Honourable J. W. Henley DL JP

President of the Board of Trade
- In office 27 February 1852 – 17 December 1852
- Monarch: Victoria
- Prime Minister: The Earl of Derby
- Preceded by: Henry Labouchere
- Succeeded by: Edward Cardwell
- In office 26 February 1858 – 3 March 1859
- Monarch: Victoria
- Prime Minister: The Earl of Derby
- Preceded by: The Lord Stanley of Alderley
- Succeeded by: The Earl of Donoughmore

Personal details
- Born: 3 March 1793
- Died: 8 December 1884 (aged 91)
- Party: Conservative
- Spouse: Georgiana Fane (d. 1864)

Joseph Warner Henley, PC, DL, JP (3 March 1793 – 8 December 1884), often known as J. W. Henley, was a British Conservative politician, best known for serving in the protectionist governments of Lord Derby in the 1850s.

== Political career ==
Henley sat as Member of Parliament for Oxfordshire from 1841 until 1878 and served as President of the Board of Trade in Derby's first (1852) and second (1858–1859) governments. He was sworn of the Privy Council in 1852. From 1874 to 1878 (year of his 84th birthday) he was the oldest member of the House of Commons.

== Family ==
Henley married Georgiana, daughter of John Fane, in 1816. She died in June 1864. Henley died in December 1884, aged 91.

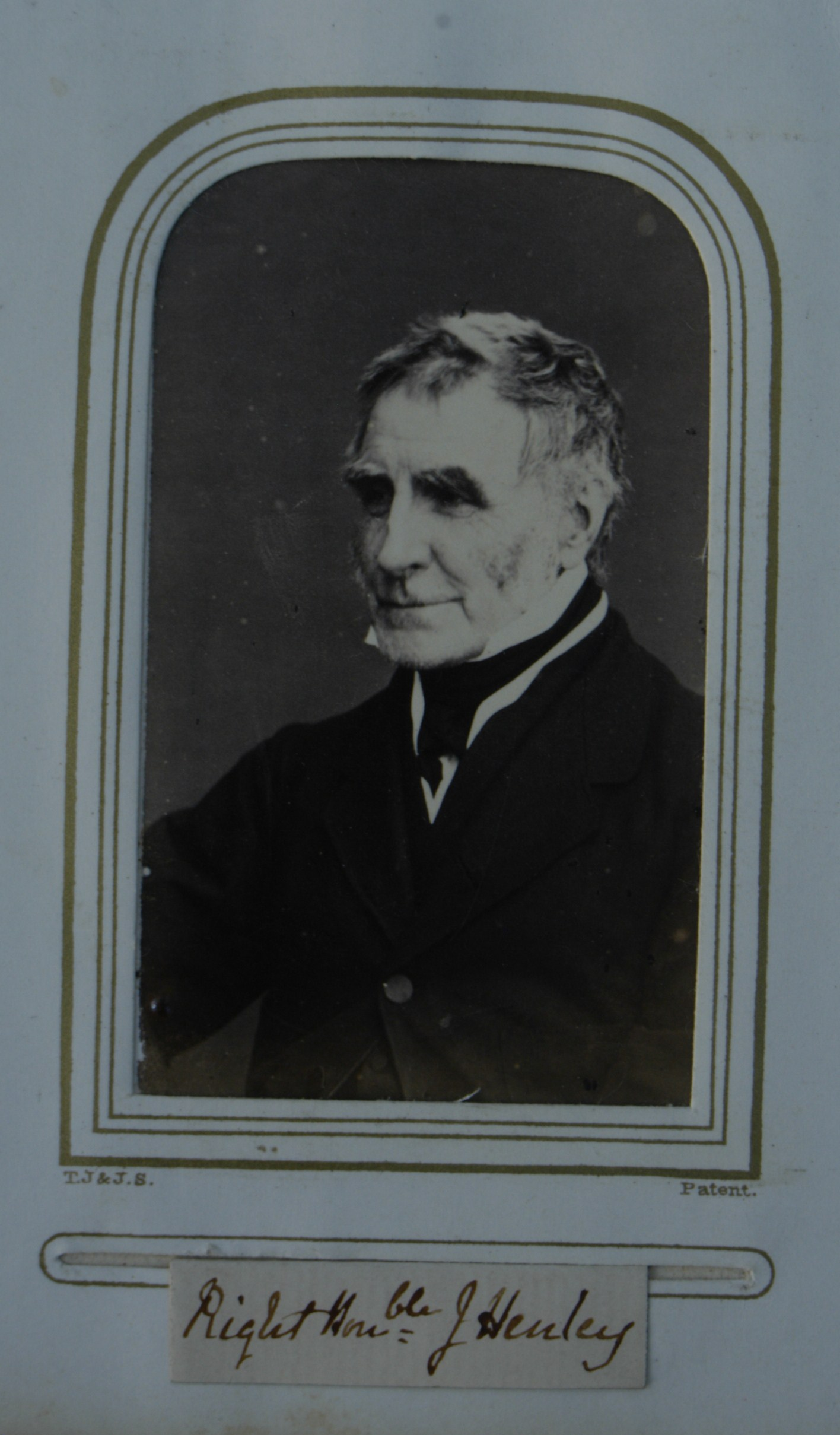
Joseph Warner Henley (1793 – 1884), in the 1860s or 70s.

Parliament of the United Kingdom
Preceded by Thomas Parker; Lord Norreys; George Harcourt	Member of Parliament for Oxfordshire; 1841–1878; With: Lord Norreys; George Harcourt to 1862; John North from 1852; John Fane 1862–1868; William Cornwallis Cartwright from 1868	Succeeded by Edward William Harcourt; John North; William Cornwallis Cartwright
Political offices
Preceded by Henry Labouchere	President of the Board of Trade; 1852	Succeeded by Edward Cardwell
Preceded by The Lord Stanley of Alderley	President of the Board of Trade; 1858–1859	Succeeded by The Earl of Donoughmore
Preceded by George Hadfield?	Oldest Member of Parliament (not Father of the House); 1874–1878	Succeeded by Thomas Bazley
