= Peter Bessels =

English politician (1363–1425)

Peter Bessels (24 June 1363 – 2 March 1425) was an English politician. He sat as MP for Oxfordshire in 1404, and for Berkshire in 1416, and 1423.

He was knighted on 28 June 1387.

== Career ==
He served as commissioner of array in Oxfordshire in December 1399, and September 1403, in Berkshire in May 1418, and March 1419. He issued a proclamation against sedition and rebellion in May 1402. He was a commissioner of inquiry in Oxfordshire in January 1412 concerning contributions to a subsidy, in Oxfordshire and Berkshire. In January 1414 he issued a proclamation concerning Lollards. he was a commissioner to raise royal loans in Berkshire in November 1419.

He served as justice of the peace for Berkshire from 16 May-October 1408, for Oxfordshire from 26 April 1418 till January 1420, and 12 February 1422 till July 1423. He ws of Oxfordshire and Berkshire from 1 December 1405-9 December 1406, and 12 November 1414-14 December 1415. He was Sheriff of Oxfordshire and Berkshire from 4 November 1409-29 November 1410.

== Personal life ==
He was the second son and eventual heir of Sir Thomas Bessels of Buckland, Berkshire (d. 1378) by Katherine (d. 1406), the daughter and heiress of John Leigh of Leigh and Kingston, Warwickshire. Before May 1384, he married Joan, the daughter of Thomas Cateway of Buscot, Berkshire. Before October 1424, he married Margery Haines (d. 18 May 1484). He had no children.
