= William Wilcotes =

English politician (died 1411)

William Wilcotes (died 7 January 1411) was an English politician. He sat as MP for Oxfordshire in 1385, February 1388, January 1390, 1391, 1394, 1395, September 1397 and 1410.

== Political career ==
He also served as commmissioner of gaol delivery in Oxford Castle in February 1387, in Oxford in February and November 1393, in Eye in August 1394, in Oxford in October 1395, in Oxford Castle in July 1399; commissioner to survey the Lordship of Macclesfield, Cheshire in August 1394, the lands of the Archbishop of Canterbury and former Lords Appellant in Berkshire, Gloucestershire and Oxfordshire in October 1397; commissioner of oyer and terminer in Oxfordshire and Worcestershire in February 1395, in Oxfordshire in April 1410; commissioner of inquiry concerning trespasses against the late Queen Anne's tenants in Cornwall in January 1396, concerning a land dispute in Berkshire in June 1399, concerning robbery in Worcestershire in August 1401, concerning treasons in Oxford in July 1402, concerning the estates of Thomas, late Lord West in Dorset, Hampshire, Sussex and Wiltshire in July 1405, concerning possessions of God's House, Southampton in Hampshire in November 1405 and March 1406, concerning William Worfton's estates in Wiltshire in May 1409, concerning estates once of Queen Anne in Oxfordshire in June 1409; commissioner to determine a dispute between the civic authorities of Coventry and Sir William Bagot in May 1396; commissioner of weirs in Oxfordshire in June 1398; commissioner to hold assizes in January 1402, in Worcestershire c. July 1406; commissioner to make proclamation regarding Henry IV's intention to govern well in Oxfordshire in May 1402; and commissioner to determine an appeal in the constable's court in March 1403.

He also served as Sheriff of Oxfordshire and Berkshire from 18 October 1392 till 7 November 1393 and 3 November 1399 till 24 November 1400; chief steward of the estates of Queen Anne before June 1394 till his death; justice of the peace of Oxfordshire from 18 June 1394 till November 1399 and 18 May 1403 till his death; justice for the eyre in Macclesfield on 9 September 1394; and Keeper of Cornbury Park in Oxfordshire from 3 November 1402 till his death.

== Family ==
He was possibly the son of Thomas Wilcotes and probably the elder brother of John Wilcotes. Probably before 1385, he married Elizabeth (died 20 October 1445), the daughter and heiress of Sir John Trillow. They had two sons and five daughters.
