= Thomas Barantyn =

English politician

Thomas Barantyn (died 22 June 1400) was an English politician. He sat as MP for Oxfordshire in February 1388, January 1390, November 1390, 1393, January 1397, and 1399.

He also served as commissioner of arrest in Oxfordshire in July 1378, June 1384, July 1387, commissioner to put down rebellion in March 1382, commissioner of inquiry in November 1383 concerning rights of the King's mother's tenants, in February 1387 concerning wrongful arrests, in December 1387 concerning escapes of felons in Thames Valley, in February 1391 concerning theft of goods seized by the water bailiff in Oxfordshire and Northamptonshire, in September 1391 concerning felonies, and commissioner of array in Oxfordshire in April 1385, March 1392, December 1399 and commissioner of weirs in June 1398.

He also served as Sheriff of Oxfordshire and Berkshire from 25 November 1378 till 5 November 1379, 24 November 1382 till 1 November 1383, 18 November 1386 till 1387, 11 November 1394 till 9 November 1395, Justice of the peace in Oxfordshire from May 1380 till December 1382, and November 1383 till his death in 1400, tax collector in Oxfordshire in December 1380, escheator in Oxfordshire and Berkshire from 30 November 1388 till 30 January 1390 and 2 January till 24 October 1392, alnager in Oxfordshire from 20 July till 24 November 1394 and served as verderer of the forets of Rockingham, Shotover and Stowood at the time of his death.

He was the first son of Thomas Barantyn and the elder brother of Drew Barantyn. Before 1381, he married Joan, who was probably the daughter of Sir Reynold Malyns and they had one son and one daughter.
