= Oxfordshire (constituency) =

Parliamentary constituency in the United Kingdom, 1801–1885

- Former county constituency for the House of Commons
- County: Oxfordshire

1290–1885
- Seats: 1290–1832: Two; 1832–1885: Three
- Replaced by: Banbury, Woodstock and Henley

Oxfordshire was a county constituency of the House of Commons of the Parliament of England then of the Parliament of Great Britain from 1707 to 1800 and of the Parliament of the United Kingdom from 1801 to 1885. It was represented by two Members of Parliament. In 1832 this was increased to three Members of Parliament. The constituency was abolished in 1885, being split into three single member divisions.

The bitterly contested Oxfordshire election of 1754 was the main inspiration for Hogarth's famous series of paintings and engravings, The Election.

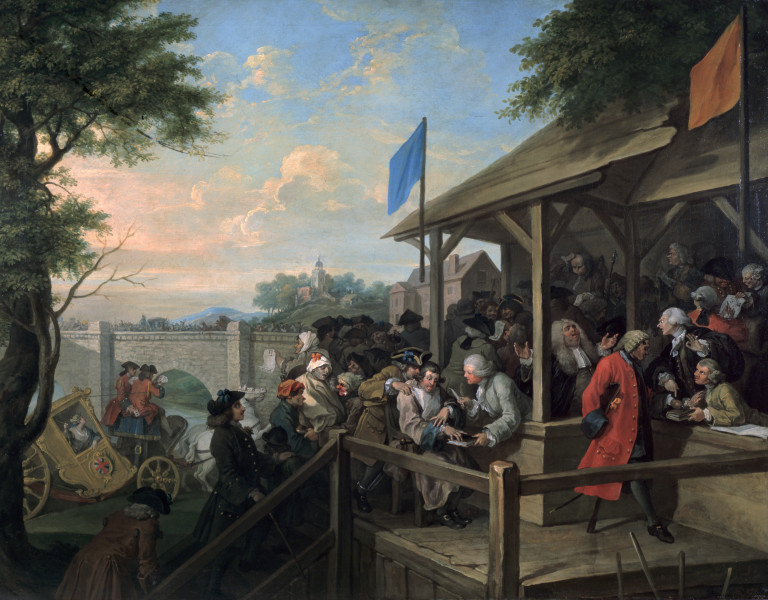
Hogarth's painting The Polling (1755), one of a series depicting the Oxfordshire election of 1754

== Boundaries ==
The constituency comprised the whole of the historic county of Oxfordshire, in the northern part of South East England. (Although Oxfordshire contained three parliamentary boroughs for part of this period – Oxford (from 1295), Woodstock (or New Woodstock) (1302–1555 and from 1571) and Banbury (from 1554) – each of which elected MPs in their own right, these were not excluded from the county constituency, and owning property within the borough could confer a vote at the county election. The Oxford University constituency was also often listed as an Oxfordshire constituency, but was non-territorial and had no effect on the right to vote in the county.)

There were minor boundary changes at the time of the Great Reform Act in 1832, when five parishes or parts of parishes were transferred to other counties while six parishes or parts of parishes were added.

In 1885 the representation of the county was changed from one three member constituency to three single member divisions. Banbury and Woodstock ceased to be parliamentary boroughs but the same names were used for two county divisions. The three new county constituencies were Banbury (or the North division); Woodstock (or the Mid division) and Henley (or the South division).

== Members of Parliament ==
=== MPs 1290–1640 ===
Parliament	First member	Second member
1316	Richard de la Bere	
1325	Richard de la Bere	
1372	Sir Gilbert Wace	
1373	Sir Richard Abberbury	
1377–1378	Robert Simeon	
1377 (Jan)	Sir Gilbert Wace	
1380	John Harrowden	
1381	Sir Thomas Blount	
1382 (Oct)	Sir Gilbert Wace	
1383 (Feb)	Sir Gilbert Wace	John Harrowden
1383 (Oct)	Sir Gilbert Wace	John Harrowden
1384 (Apr)	Sir Gilbert Wace	
1384 (Nov)	Sir Gilbert Wace	
1385	Sir Gilbert Wace	
1386	Sir Richard Abberbury	Sir Gilbert Wace
1388 (Feb)	William Wilcotes	Thomas Barantyn
1388 (Sep)	Sir Thomas de la Poyle	John Rede
1390 (Jan)	William Wilcotes	Thomas Barantyn
1390 (Nov)	Sir Thomas de la Poyle	Thomas Barantyn
1391	William Wilcotes	John Rede
1393	Sir Thomas Paynell	Thomas Barantyn
1394	William Wilcotes	John Abberbury
1395	William Wilcotes	William Bruley
1397 (Jan)	John Abberbury	Thomas Barantyn
1397 (Sep)	William Wilcotes	John Golafre
1399	John Wilcotes	Thomas Barantyn
1401	John Wilcotes	Thomas Chaucer
1402	Thomas Wykeham	Thomas Chaucer
1404 (Jan)	Sir Peter Bessels	William Mackney
1404 (Oct)	Sir John Drayton	John Wilcotes
1406	Thomas Chaucer	John Wilcotes
1407	Thomas Chaucer	John Wilcotes
1410	Thomas Chaucer	William Wilcotes
1411	Thomas Chaucer	return lost
1413 (Feb)	returns lost	
1413 (May)	Thomas Chaucer	John Wilcotes
1414 (Apr)	Sir William Lisle	John Wilcotes
1414 (Nov)	Thomas Chaucer	John Wilcotes
1415	returns lost	
1416 (Mar)	Thomas Stonor	Sir Thomas Wykeham
1416 (Oct)	returns lost	
1417	Sir William Lisle	John Wilcotes
1419	Thomas Stonor	John Wilcotes
1420	John Danvers	Richard Greville
1421 (May)	Thomas Chaucer	John Wilcotes
1421 (Dec)	John Danvers	Peter Fettiplace
1422	Sir Thomas Wykeham	Thomas Chaucer
1423	John Danvers	Peter Fettiplace
1425		Thomas Stonor
1426	Thomas Chaucer	
1427	Thomas Stonor	Thomas Chaucer
1429	Thomas Stonor	Thomas Chaucer
1431	Thomas Stonor	Thomas Chaucer
1432	Richard Quatremain	
1433	Richard Quatremain	
1435	Peter Fettiplace	John Danvers
1510–1523	No names known	
1529	Sir John Dauntesey	Sir William Barentyne
1536		
1539	William Fermor	John Welsborne
1542	Sir John Williams	Edward __?
1545		
1547	Sir John Williams	Richard Fiennes
1553 (Mar)	Sir Andrew Dudley	Sir John Williams
1553 (Oct)	Sir John Williams	John Pollard
1554 (Apr)	Sir Leonard Chamberlain	John Pollard
1554 (Nov)	Sir Leonard Chamberlain	John Pollard
1555	Sir Thomas Wenman	Edmund Powell
1558	George Owen	Thomas Denton
1559 (Jan)	Thomas Brydges	Edmund Ashfield
1562 (Dec)	Sir Francis Knollys	Sir Richard Blount, died and replaced 1566 by Edward Unton
1571	Sir Francis Knollys	Henry Norris
1572 (Apr)	Sir Francis Knollys	Henry Knollys
1584 (Nov)	Sir Francis Knollys	William Knollys
1586 (Oct)	Sir Francis Knollys	Richard Fiennes
1588	Sir Francis Knollys	Sir John Norreys
1593	Sir Francis Knollys	Sir William Knollys
1597 (Sep)	Sir William Knollys	Sir Richard Wenman
1601 (Sep)	Sir William Knollys	Ralph Warcoppe
1604	Lawrence Tanfield	John Doyley
1614	Sir Anthony Cope, 1st Baronet	Sir John Croke
1621	Sir Richard Wenman	Sir William Pope
1624	Sir William Cope	Sir Henry Poole
1625	Edward Wray	Sir Richard Wenman
1626	Hon. James Fiennes	Sir Thomas Wenman
1628	Hon. James Fiennes	Sir Francis Wenman
1629–1640	No Parliament	

=== MPs 1640–1832 ===
Year	First member	First party	Second member	Second party
April 1640	Hon. James Fiennes	Parliamentarian	Sir Francis Wenman	
November 1640	Hon. James Fiennes	Parliamentarian	The Viscount Wenman	Parliamentarian
December 1648	Fiennes and Wenman excluded in Pride's Purge – both seats vacant			
Oxfordshire had 3 representatives in the nominated Barebones Parliament
1653	Sir Charles Wolseley, William Draper, Dr Jonathan Goddard			
Oxfordshire had 5 MPs in the First and Second Parliaments of the Protectorate
1654	Robert Jenkinson, Charles Fleetwood, Colonel James Whitelocke, Nathaniel Fiennes, William Lenthall			
1656	Robert Jenkinson, Lord Deputy Charles Fleetwood, William Lenthall, Miles Fleetwood, Sir Francis Norreys			
Representation reverted to two MPs in the Third Protectorate Parliament
January 1659	Robert Jenkinson		The Viscount Falkland	
May 1659	Not represented in the restored Rump			
April 1660	The Viscount Wenman		Hon. James Fiennes	
1661	The Viscount Falkland		Sir Anthony Cope	
1663	William Knollys		Sir Anthony Cope	
1664	Sir Francis Wenman		Sir Anthony Cope	
1675	Sir Francis Wenman		Sir Edward Norreys	Tory
February 1679	Sir John Cope	Whig	Sir Edward Norreys	Tory
August 1679	Sir John Cope	Whig	Thomas Horde	
1681	Sir Philip Harcourt		Thomas Horde	
1685	The Viscount Falkland		Thomas Tipping	
1689	Sir Robert Jenkinson		Sir John Cope	Whig
1690	Sir Robert Jenkinson		Lord Norreys	
1699	Sir Robert Jenkinson		Sir Robert Dashwood	
1701	Sir Robert Jenkinson		Sir Edward Norreys	Tory
1708	Sir Robert Jenkinson		Viscount Rialton	
February 1710	Sir Robert Jenkinson		Viscount Rialton	
October 1710	Sir Robert Jenkinson		Francis Clerke	
1715	Sir Robert Jenkinson		James Herbert	
1717	Sir Banks Jenkinson		James Herbert	
1721	Sir Banks Jenkinson		Henry Perrot	
1727	Sir William Stapleton		Henry Perrot	
January 1740	Sir James Dashwood		Henry Perrot	
February 1740	Sir James Dashwood		Viscount Quarendon	
1743	Sir James Dashwood		Norreys Bertie	
1754	Viscount Parker	Whig	Sir Edward Turner	Whig
1761	Lord Charles Spencer	Whig	Sir James Dashwood	Tory
1768	Lord Charles Spencer	Whig	The Viscount Wenman	
1790	Marquess of Blandford	Whig	The Viscount Wenman	
1796	Lord Charles Spencer	Whig	John Fane I	Tory
1801	Lord Francis Spencer	Tory	John Fane I	Tory
1815	William Henry Ashhurst	Tory	John Fane I	Tory
1824 by-election	William Henry Ashhurst	Tory	John Fane II	Tory
1830	Lord Norreys	Tory	John Fane II	Tory
1831	George Harcourt	Whig	Richard Weyland	Whig
1832	Representation increased to three members			

=== MPs 1832–1885 ===
Election	First member	First party	Second member	Second party	Third member	Third party
1832	Montagu Bertie	Tory	George Harcourt	Whig	Richard Weyland	Whig
1834	Montagu Bertie	Conservative	George Harcourt	Whig	Richard Weyland	Whig
1835	Montagu Bertie	Conservative	George Harcourt	Conservative	Richard Weyland	Whig
1837	Montagu Bertie	Conservative	George Harcourt	Conservative	Thomas Parker	Conservative
1841	Montagu Bertie	Conservative	George Harcourt	Conservative	J. W. Henley	Conservative
1852	John North	Conservative	George Harcourt	Conservative	J. W. Henley	Conservative
1857	John North	Conservative	George Harcourt	Peelite	J. W. Henley	Conservative
1859	John North	Conservative	George Harcourt	Liberal	J. W. Henley	Conservative
1862 by-election	John North	Conservative	John Fane III	Conservative	J. W. Henley	Conservative
1868	John North	Conservative	William Cornwallis Cartwright	Liberal	J. W. Henley	Conservative
1878 by-election	John North	Conservative	William Cornwallis Cartwright	Liberal	Edward Vernon Harcourt	Conservative
1885	Constituency abolished, replaced by Banbury, Woodstock, and Henley					

== Elections ==
The county franchise, from 1430, was held by the adult male owners of freehold land valued at 40 shillings or more. The bloc vote electoral system was used in two seat elections and first past the post for single member by-elections. Each elector had as many votes as there were seats to be filled. Votes had to be cast by a spoken declaration, in public, at the hustings, which took place in Oxford. The expense and difficulty of voting at only one location in the county, together with the lack of a secret ballot contributed to the corruption and intimidation of electors, which was widespread in the unreformed British political system.

The expense, to candidates and their supporters, of contested elections encouraged the leading families of the county to agree on the candidates to be returned unopposed whenever possible. Contested county elections were therefore unusual. The Tory Dukes of Marlborough, dominated the county from their seat at Blenheim Palace. One seat was usually held by a Spencer, the other by a local family acceptable to the Duke. Between 1700 and 1826 there was only one contest.

== Election results ==
Note on percentage change calculations: Where there was only one candidate of a party in successive elections, for the same number of seats, change is calculated on the party percentage vote. Where there was more than one candidate, in one or both successive elections for the same number of seats, then change is calculated on the individual percentage vote.

Note on sources: The information for the election results given below is taken from Stooks Smith 1715–1754, Namier and Brooke 1754–1790 and Stooks Smith 1790–1832. From 1832 the principal source was Craig, with additional or different information from Stooks Smith included.

=== Election results 1715–1800 ===
1710s –

1720s – 1730s – 1740s – 1750s – 1760s – 1770s – 1780s – 1790s

==== Elections in the 1710s ====
General election 1715: Oxfordshire (2 seats)
Party	Candidate	Votes	%	±%
Nonpartisan	Francis Clerke	Unopposed	N/A	N/A
Nonpartisan	Robert Jenkinson	Unopposed	N/A	N/A

- Death of Clerke

By-election May 1715: Oxfordshire
Party	Candidate	Votes	%	±%
Nonpartisan	James Herbert	Unopposed	N/A	N/A
Nonpartisan hold		Swing	N/A	

- Death of Jenkinson

By-election November 1717: Oxfordshire
Party	Candidate	Votes	%	±%
Nonpartisan	Banks Jenkinson	Unopposed	N/A	N/A
Nonpartisan hold		Swing	N/A	

==== Elections in the 1720s ====
- Death of Herbert

By-election May 1722: Oxfordshire
Party	Candidate	Votes	%	±%
Nonpartisan	Henry Perrot	Unopposed	N/A	N/A
Nonpartisan hold		Swing	N/A	

General election 1722: Oxfordshire (2 seats)
Party	Candidate	Votes	%	±%
Nonpartisan	Banks Jenkinson	Unopposed	N/A	N/A
Nonpartisan	Henry Perrot	Unopposed	N/A	N/A

General election 1727: Oxfordshire (2 seats)
Party	Candidate	Votes	%	±%
Nonpartisan	Henry Perrot	Unopposed	N/A	N/A
Nonpartisan	William Stapleton	Unopposed	N/A	N/A

==== Elections in the 1730s ====
General election 1734: Oxfordshire (2 seats)
Party	Candidate	Votes	%	±%
Nonpartisan	Henry Perrot	Unopposed	N/A	N/A
Nonpartisan	William Stapleton	Unopposed	N/A	N/A

- Death of Stapleton

By-election January 1739: Oxfordshire
Party	Candidate	Votes	%	±%
Nonpartisan	James Dashwood	Unopposed	N/A	N/A
Nonpartisan hold		Swing	N/A	

- Death of Perrot

By-election February 1739: Oxfordshire
Party	Candidate	Votes	%	±%
Nonpartisan	George Lee	Unopposed	N/A	N/A
Nonpartisan hold		Swing	N/A	

==== Elections in the 1740s ====
General election 1741: Oxfordshire (2 seats)
Party	Candidate	Votes	%	±%
Nonpartisan	James Dashwood	Unopposed	N/A	N/A
Nonpartisan	George Lee	Unopposed	N/A	N/A

- Succession of Quarendon to the peerage as The 3rd Earl of Lichfield

By-election February 1742: Oxfordshire
Party	Candidate	Votes	%	±%
Nonpartisan	Norris Bertie	Unopposed	N/A	N/A
Nonpartisan hold		Swing	N/A	

General election 1747: Oxfordshire (2 seats)
Party	Candidate	Votes	%	±%
Nonpartisan	James Dashwood	Unopposed	N/A	N/A
Nonpartisan	Norris Bertie	Unopposed	N/A	N/A

==== Elections in the 1750s ====
General election 17 April 1754: Oxfordshire (2 seats)
Party	Candidate	Votes	%	±%
Tory	Philip Wenman	2,033	51.76	N/A
Tory	James Dashwood	2,014	51.28	N/A
Whig	Thomas Parker	1,919	48.86	N/A
Whig	Edward Turner	1,890	48.12	N/A
Turnout		7,856	N/A	N/A

- Wenman was a Peer of Ireland. There was a double return (of all four candidates) after the most hotly contested county election of the century. The disputed election was decided by the House of Commons on petition, with Parker and Turner being declared duly elected on 23 April 1755.

==== Elections in the 1760s ====
General election 8 April 1761: Oxfordshire (2 seats)
Party	Candidate	Votes	%	±%
Whig	Charles Spencer	Unopposed	N/A	N/A
Tory	James Dashwood	Unopposed	N/A	N/A

- Seat vacated on Spencer being appointed Ranger of Windsor Forest.

By-election 12 January 1763: Oxfordshire
Party	Candidate	Votes	%	±%
Whig	Charles Spencer	Unopposed	N/A	N/A
Whig hold		Swing	N/A	

- Seat vacated on Spencer being appointed Comptroller of the Household.

By-election April 1763: Oxfordshire
Party	Candidate	Votes	%	±%
Whig	Charles Spencer	Unopposed	N/A	N/A
Whig hold		Swing	N/A	

- Note (April 1763): By-election in Stooks Smith, but not in Namier and Brooke.

General election 30 March 1768: Oxfordshire (2 seats)
Party	Candidate	Votes	%	±%
Nonpartisan	Charles Spencer	Unopposed	N/A	N/A
Nonpartisan	Philip Wenman	Unopposed	N/A	N/A

- Wenman was a peer of Ireland

==== Elections in the 1770s ====
General election 19 October 1774: Oxfordshire (2 seats)
Party	Candidate	Votes	%	±%
Nonpartisan	Charles Spencer	Unopposed	N/A	N/A
Nonpartisan	Philip Wenman	Unopposed	N/A	N/A

- Seat vacated on the appointment of Spencer as Treasurer of the Chamber

By-election 22 December 1779: Oxfordshire
Party	Candidate	Votes	%	±%
Nonpartisan	Charles Spencer	Unopposed	N/A	N/A
Nonpartisan hold		Swing	N/A	

==== Elections in the 1780s ====
General election 27 September 1780: Oxfordshire (2 seats)
Party	Candidate	Votes	%	±%
Nonpartisan	Charles Spencer	Unopposed	N/A	N/A
Nonpartisan	Philip Wenman	Unopposed	N/A	N/A

- Seat vacated on the appointment of Spencer as a Vice Treasurer of Ireland

By-election 18 December 1782: Oxfordshire
Party	Candidate	Votes	%	±%
Nonpartisan	Charles Spencer	Unopposed	N/A	N/A
Nonpartisan hold		Swing	N/A	

General election 7 April 1784: Oxfordshire (2 seats)
Party	Candidate	Votes	%	±%
Nonpartisan	Charles Spencer	Unopposed	N/A	N/A
Nonpartisan	Philip Wenman	Unopposed	N/A	N/A

==== Elections in the 1790s ====
General election 1790: Oxfordshire (2 seats)
Party	Candidate	Votes	%	±%
Nonpartisan	Philip Wenman	Unopposed	N/A	N/A
Nonpartisan	George Spencer-Churchill	Unopposed	N/A	N/A

General election 1796: Oxfordshire (2 seats)
Party	Candidate	Votes	%	±%
Nonpartisan	Charles Spencer	Unopposed	N/A	N/A
Nonpartisan	John Fane I	Unopposed	N/A	N/A

=== Election results 1801–1885 ===
1800s –

1810s – 1820s – 1830s – 1840s – 1850s – 1860s – 1870s – 1880s

==== Elections in the 1800s ====
- Seat vacated on the appointment of Spencer as Postmaster General

By-election February 1801: Oxfordshire
Party	Candidate	Votes	%	±%
Nonpartisan	Francis Spencer	Unopposed	N/A	N/A
Nonpartisan hold				

General election 1802: Oxfordshire (2 seats)
Party	Candidate	Votes	%	±%
Tory	John Fane I	Unopposed	N/A	N/A
Tory	Francis Spencer	Unopposed	N/A	N/A

General election 1806: Oxfordshire (2 seats)
Party	Candidate	Votes	%	±%
Tory	John Fane I	Unopposed	N/A	N/A
Tory	Francis Spencer	Unopposed	N/A	N/A

General election 1807: Oxfordshire (2 seats)
Party	Candidate	Votes	%	±%
Tory	John Fane I	Unopposed	N/A	N/A
Tory	Francis Spencer	Unopposed	N/A	N/A

==== Elections in the 1810s ====
General election 1812: Oxfordshire (2 seats)
Party	Candidate	Votes	%	±%
Tory	John Fane I	Unopposed	N/A	N/A
Tory	Francis Spencer	Unopposed	N/A	N/A

- Creation of Spencer as 1st Baron Churchill

By-election February 1816: Oxfordshire
Party	Candidate	Votes	%	±%
Tory	William Henry Ashurst (politician)	Unopposed	N/A	N/A
Tory hold		Swing	N/A	

General election 1818: Oxfordshire (2 seats)
Party	Candidate	Votes	%	±%
Tory	John Fane I	Unopposed	N/A	N/A
Tory	William Henry Ashurst (politician)	Unopposed	N/A	N/A

==== Elections in the 1820s ====
General election 1820: Oxfordshire (2 seats)
Party	Candidate	Votes	%	±%
Tory	John Fane I	Unopposed	N/A	N/A
Tory	William Henry Ashurst (politician)	Unopposed	N/A	N/A

- Death of Fane

By-election February 1824: Oxfordshire
Party	Candidate	Votes	%	±%
Tory	John Fane II	Unopposed	N/A	N/A
Tory hold				

General election 1826: Oxfordshire (2 seats)
Party	Candidate	Votes	%	±%
Tory	William Henry Ashurst (politician)	1,329	36.36	N/A
Tory	John Fane II	1,268	34.69	N/A
Whig	George Frederick Stratton	1,058	28.95	New
Majority		210	5.74	N/A
Turnout		3,655 (2,295 voted)	N/A	N/A
Tory hold		Swing		
Tory hold		Swing		

Note (1826): Stooks Smith records that the polls were open for three days

==== Elections in the 1830s ====
General election 1830: Oxfordshire (2 seats)
Party	Candidate	Votes	%	±%
Tory	John Fane II	1,904	39.9	+3.5
Tory	Montagu Bertie	1,618	33.9	−0.8
Whig	George Dashwood	1,246	26.1	−2.8
Majority		372	7.8	+2.1
Turnout		2,762	c. 78.9	
Registered electors		c. 3,500		
Tory hold		Swing		
Tory hold		Swing		

General election 1831: Oxfordshire (2 seats)
Party	Candidate	Votes	%	±%
Whig	George Harcourt	1,782	37.2	+24.1
Whig	Richard Weyland	1,688	35.3	+22.2
Tory	Montagu Bertie	1,316	27.5	−46.3
Majority		372	7.8	±0.0
Turnout		2,934	c. 83.8	c. +4.9
Registered electors		c. 3,500		
Whig gain from Tory		Swing	+23.6	
Whig gain from Tory		Swing	+22.7	

- Note (1831): Stooks Smith records that the polls were open for three days
- Representation increased to three seats under the Reform Act 1832

General election 1832: Oxfordshire (3 seats)
Party	Candidate	Votes	%
Whig	George Harcourt	Unopposed	
Whig	Richard Weyland	Unopposed	
Tory	Montagu Bertie	Unopposed	
Registered electors		4,721	
Whig hold			
Whig hold			
Tory win (new seat)			

General election 1835: Oxfordshire (3 seats)
Party	Candidate	Votes	%
Whig	Richard Weyland	Unopposed	
Conservative	George Harcourt	Unopposed	
Conservative	Montagu Bertie	Unopposed	
Registered electors		4,716	
Whig hold			
Conservative hold			
Conservative gain from Whig			

- Note (1835): For this election Stooks Smith records the number of registered electors as 5,164 instead of the number given by Craig used above.

General election 1837: Oxfordshire (3 seats)
Party	Candidate	Votes	%
Conservative	Montagu Bertie	3,002	29.7
Conservative	George Harcourt	2,885	28.5
Conservative	Thomas Parker	2,767	27.4
Whig	Thomas Stonor	1,458	14.4
Majority		1,309	13.0
Turnout		4,125	78.5
Registered electors		5,253	
Conservative hold			
Conservative hold			
Conservative gain from Whig			

==== Elections in the 1840s ====
General election 1841: Oxfordshire (3 seats)
Party	Candidate	Votes	%	±%
Conservative	George Harcourt	Unopposed		
Conservative	J. W. Henley	Unopposed		
Conservative	Montagu Bertie	Unopposed		
Registered electors		5,809		
Conservative hold				
Conservative hold				
Conservative hold				

- Note (1841): Stooks Smith records the number of registered electors as 5,721 instead of the number given by Craig used above.

General election 1847: Oxfordshire (3 seats)
Party	Candidate	Votes	%	±%
Conservative	George Harcourt	Unopposed		
Conservative	J. W. Henley	Unopposed		
Conservative	Montagu Bertie	Unopposed		
Registered electors		5,384		
Conservative hold				
Conservative hold				
Conservative hold				

==== Elections in the 1850s ====
- Seat vacated on the appointment of Henley as President of the Board of Trade

By-election 10 March 1852: Oxfordshire
Party	Candidate	Votes	%	±%
Conservative	J. W. Henley	Unopposed		
Conservative hold				

General election 1852: Oxfordshire (3 seats)
Party	Candidate	Votes	%	±%
Conservative	J. W. Henley	2,328	35.6	N/A
Conservative	John North	2,218	33.9	N/A
Conservative	George Harcourt	1,313	20.1	N/A
Conservative	Montagu Bertie	681	10.4	N/A
Majority		632	9.7	N/A
Turnout		2,180 (est)	41.9 (est)	N/A
Registered electors		5,198		
Conservative hold		Swing	N/A	
Conservative hold		Swing	N/A	
Conservative hold		Swing	N/A	

Note (1852): The minimum possible turnout is estimated by dividing the number of votes cast by three. To the extent that electors did not use all their three possible votes the figure given will be an underestimate of the true turnout

General election 1857: Oxfordshire (3 seats)
Party	Candidate	Votes	%	±%
Peelite	George Harcourt	Unopposed		
Conservative	J. W. Henley	Unopposed		
Conservative	John North	Unopposed		
Registered electors		5,119		
Peelite gain from Conservative				
Conservative hold				
Conservative hold				

- Seat vacated on the appointment of Henley as President of the Board of Trade

By-election 6 March 1858: Oxfordshire
Party	Candidate	Votes	%	±%
Conservative	J. W. Henley	Unopposed		
Conservative hold				

General election 1859: Oxfordshire (3 seats)
Party	Candidate	Votes	%	±%
Liberal	George Harcourt	Unopposed		
Conservative	J. W. Henley	Unopposed		
Conservative	John North	Unopposed		
Registered electors		5,123		
Liberal hold				
Conservative hold				
Conservative hold				

==== Elections in the 1860s ====
- Death of Harcourt

By-election 3 February 1862: Oxfordshire
Party	Candidate	Votes	%	±%
Conservative	John Fane III	1,909	52.6	N/A
Liberal	Henry Dashwood, 5th Baronet	1,722	47.4	N/A
Majority		187	5.2	N/A
Turnout		3,631	72.5	N/A
Registered electors		5,010		
Conservative gain from Liberal		Swing	N/A	

General election 1865: Oxfordshire (3 seats)
Party	Candidate	Votes	%	±%
Conservative	John Fane III	Unopposed		
Conservative	J. W. Henley	Unopposed		
Conservative	John North	Unopposed		
Registered electors		5,798		
Conservative hold				
Conservative hold				
Conservative gain from Liberal				

- The Reform Act 1867 expanded the electorate and introduced the limited vote for three seat constituencies (reducing the maximum number of votes per elector from three to two).

General election 1868: Oxfordshire (3 seats)
Party	Candidate	Votes	%	±%
Liberal	William Cornwallis Cartwright	Unopposed		
Conservative	J. W. Henley	Unopposed		
Conservative	John North	Unopposed		
Registered electors		7,663		
Liberal gain from Conservative				
Conservative hold				
Conservative hold				

==== Elections in the 1870s ====
General election 1874: Oxfordshire (3 seats)
Party	Candidate	Votes	%	±%
Liberal	William Cornwallis Cartwright	Unopposed		
Conservative	J. W. Henley	Unopposed		
Conservative	John North	Unopposed		
Registered electors		7,554		
Liberal hold				
Conservative hold				
Conservative hold				

- Seat vacated on the resignation of Henley

By-election 5 February 1878: Oxfordshire
Party	Candidate	Votes	%	±%
Conservative	Edward Vernon Harcourt	Unopposed		
Conservative hold				

==== Elections in the 1880s ====
General election 1880: Oxfordshire (3 seats)
Party	Candidate	Votes	%	±%
Liberal	William Cornwallis Cartwright	Unopposed		
Conservative	Edward Vernon Harcourt	Unopposed		
Conservative	John North	Unopposed		
Registered electors		7,495		
Liberal hold				
Conservative hold				
Conservative hold				

- Electorate expanded by the Representation of the People Act 1884 and constituency split into single member divisions by the Redistribution of Seats Act 1885, with effect from the 1885 United Kingdom general election.

== See also ==
- List of former United Kingdom Parliament constituencies

== Sources ==
- Leigh Rayment's Historical List of MPs – Constituencies beginning with "O"
