= Elizabeth Noel, Viscountess Campden =

Wife of Baptist Noel, 3rd Viscount Campden

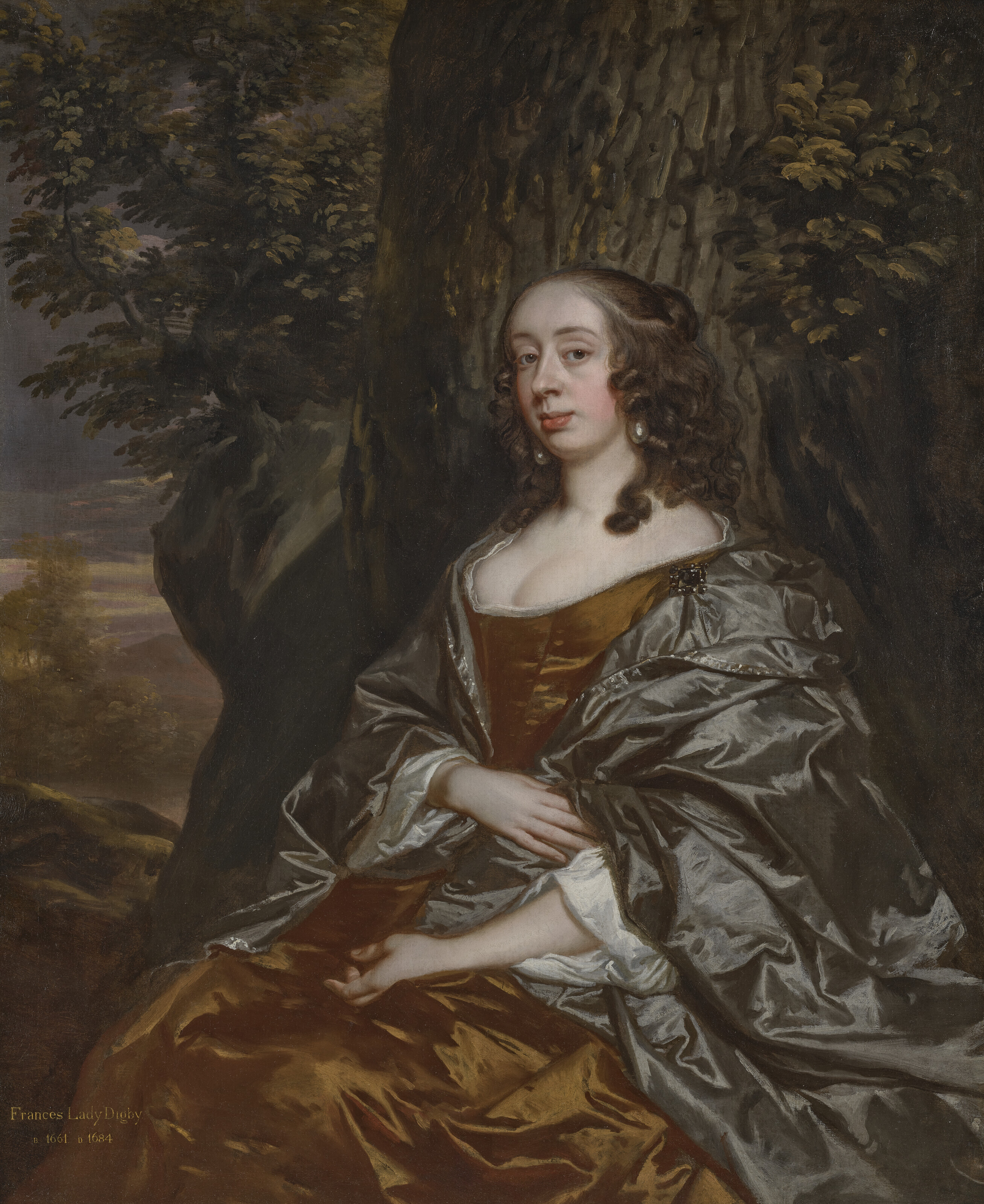
Peter Lely, Portrait of Elizabeth Noel, Viscountess Campden

Elizabeth Noel, Viscountess Campden (1640 – July 1683), formerly Lady Elizabeth Bertie, was the fourth wife of Baptist Noel, 3rd Viscount Campden, and the mother of nine of his children.

Lady Elizabeth was the daughter of Montagu Bertie, 2nd Earl of Lindsey, and his first wife, Martha Ramsay (née Cockayne), Dowager Countess of Holderness. Her siblings included Robert Bertie, 3rd Earl of Lindsey, Hon. Peregrine Bertie, Hon. Richard Bertie, Hon. Vere Bertie and Hon. Charles Bertie, as well as two sisters.

Elizabeth married Viscount Campden on 6 July 1655, when she was 15 and he was in his forties; he had been widowed three times, and had at least four surviving children, including his heir, Edward. Elizabeth's children by Campden were:

- Baptist Noel, MP, who married Susannah Fanshaw and was the father of Baptist Noel, 3rd Earl of Gainsborough
- John Noel (1659–1718), who married Elizabeth Sherard and had children
- Martha Penelope Noel, who married a Mr Dormer
- Catherine Noel (1657-1724 or 1733) who married, as his third wife, John Manners, 1st Duke of Rutland, and had children

A portrait of Viscountess Campden was painted by Sir Peter Lely. She outlived her husband by a year, and is buried with him at the Church of St Peter and St Paul, in Exton, Rutland.
