= Henry Bertie =

Henry Bertie may refer to:

- Henry Bertie (of Weston-on-the-Green) (c. 1656–1734), Member of Parliament for Oxford, Westbury, and Woodstock
- Henry Bertie (MP for Beaumaris) (1675–1735), Lord Proprietor of North Carolina and Member of Parliament for Beaumaris
