= Henry Bertie (of Weston-on-the-Green) =

English soldier and Tory politician

Henry Bertie, JP (ca. 1656 – 4 December 1734), of Chesterton, Oxfordshire was an English soldier and Tory politician who sat in the English and British House of Commons between 1678 and 1715.

== Early life ==
Bertie was a younger son of Montagu Bertie, 2nd Earl of Lindsey by his second wife, Lady Norreys, daughter of Edward Wray, of Rycote, Oxfordshire and widow of Hon. Edward Sackville. His mother, who died shortly after his birth, seems to have let him enough of an inheritance to be comfortably provided for, including the manor of Nutley in Long Crendon.

Bertie was one of the commissioners of assessment for Oxfordshire from 1677 to 1680. When Lord Gerard raised a troop of horse in 1678 in anticipation of a war with France, Bertie was commissioned a captain; the troop was disbanded in the following year. In 1678, after Thomas Wancklyn was expelled from the House of Commons, he was nominated for the vacant Parliamentary seat at Westbury on the interest of his elder brother, Lord Norreys, whose wife was a part owner of the manor of Westbury. The Berties, representing the court party, were opposed by a local squire, William Trenchard, a Presbyterian. Henry was returned by 21 votes to 13; two election petitions by Trenchard and the opposition to overturn the result were defeated. It is not clear that he was active in the Cavalier Parliament, and in December, he was sent for in custody for non-attendance. In the general election of March 1679, he was defeated by Trenchard and Richard Lewis, the other sitting member. Appointed a commissioner of assessment for Buckinghamshire and a justice of the peace for Oxfordshire in 1679, he and Lewis defeated the two exclusionist candidates, Trenchard and Edward Norton at Westbury in the general election of October 1679. He was not appointed to any committees in the subsequent Exclusion Bill Parliament; during 1680, he was taken off both commissions of assessment, although he was made a deputy lieutenant of Oxfordshire, and in November, an election petition by Trenchard and Norton was accepted by Parliament. Bertie and Lewis were turned out and the returning officer, the mayor of Westbury, was confined for two weeks for "great misdemeanours" in making the return.

At the 1681 election, he stood instead as an uncontested court candidate for Woodstock, where his brother had built up an interest through the Norreys estates and his office as Lord Lieutenant of Oxfordshire. No Parliamentary activity by Henry can be traced in the Third Exclusion Bill Parliament. Henry and Norreys were both admitted as freemen of Oxford on 14 June 1681; later that year, Henry served on the foreman of the grand jury of Oxfordshire during Norreys' successful proceedings against Stephen College on the court's behalf. He was commissioned a captain of Oxfordshire militia horse before 1681, and after the discovery of the Rye House Plot in 1683, he was employed in searching for arms secreted by the conspirators.

In March 1685, Bertie was returned as Member of Parliament for Oxford on the interest of his brother, now Lord Abingdon. All the candidates were Tories; one of the sitting members, Whigs, had died and the other retired from politics. Bertie topped the poll with 657 votes, the recorder of the borough, Sir George Pudsey received 611, while Sir Edward Norreys, who had represented the county and whose daughter Bertie would soon marry, polled only 53. Abingdon celebrated the event with a splendid celebration for the members of the corporation at his seat in Rycote, from which most returned "drunk and fell off their horses", according to Anthony Wood. He showed more activity in this Parliament, serving on the elections committee and the committee for taking accounts of the commissioners for disbanding the army.

== Monmouth Rebellion and disaffection ==
After the outbreak of the Monmouth Rebellion, Bertie and his half-brother Richard were commissioned captains on 18 June to raise independent troops of horse. On 21 June, Henry led the troop of Oxfordshire Militia Horse out of Oxford toward Dorchester and Abingdon to act against the rebels in Somerset, while Abingdon raised his troop on his behalf. The troop was disbanded in December; the independent troops that were not incorporated into existing regiments were disbanded after the collapse of the rebellion, Wood records that Henry and Richard were among the officers deprived of their commissions for voting in the House of Commons in favor of the address to James II against employing Roman Catholic officers. Sometime after 1685, he was appointed a justice of the peace for Buckinghamshire. Like his brothers, Bertie belonged to the High Tories who were alienated from the court by the pro-Catholic policies of King James. In 1687, he lost his militia commission, his deputy lieutenancy, and was removed from the commission of the peace in Oxfordshire.

In February 1688, Bertie was removed from the Buckinghamshire bench as well. He was admitted a freeman of Devizes in March, but was removed from the Oxford corporation in June when it was purged and remodelled. In September 1688, his nephew Lord Norreys treated some of the country gentlemen of Oxfordshire to solicit support for Henry in the anticipated elections. He was reinstated at Oxford in October when the King began to reverse the program of remodelling the corporations.

By this time, the Glorious Revolution was already in train. Early in November, Abingdon was the first of the peers to openly take arms for William of Orange. On 22 November, Bertie and his father-in-law Sir Edward Norreys held a dinner with the corporation of Oxford, and agreed to bring Oxford over to William as well. On 25 November, he led a company of men out of Oxford to Witney, who met reinforcements there and proceeded toward Banbury. Bertie and his militia joined Sir Ralph Dutton in rescuing Lord Lovelace from jail in Gloucester; Lovelace, a zealous Whig and political rival of the Berties before the Revolution, had been captured at Cirencester trying to break through a force loyal to James. Bertie returned to Oxford on 5 December with the troops under Lord Lovelace, who came to hold Oxford for the Prince. He and Norreys were returned for Oxford in the abortive December elections.

Under King William in 1689, Bertie was restored as a deputy lieutenant of Oxfordshire, which he held until 1701, to the commission of the peace and as a militia captain there, and as a commissioner for the assessment of both Oxfordshire and Buckinghamshire. He and Norreys were returned again for Oxford to the Convention Parliament. He was not active as a committeeman, and his time there was principally distinguished by a violent quarrel with Sir William Harbord over some remarks by the latter aimed at Bertie, about (royal) pensioners and the Westbury election. The matter ran close to a duel, and Bertie had to be secured by the serjeant-at-arms until Speaker Trevor extracted pledges from them not to renew the quarrel.

== Family ==
Before May 1687, Bertie married Philadelphia Norreys (died before 1715), daughter and heiress of Sir Edward Norreys of Weston-on-the-Green. They had five children:

- James Bertie (died 7 May 1728), married Elizabeth Harris (d. 1720) and had a son, Norreys Bertie, and a daughter, Philadelphia (d. 1720)
- Rev. Charles Montagu Bertie (died 17 October 1744), rector of Uffington, died unmarried
- Eleanora Bertie, died unmarried
- Anne Bertie, died unmarried
- Catherine Bertie, married Francis Carr Clerke

After Philadelphia's death, Bertie married Catherine Fetherston (died 8 February 1736), daughter of Sir Heneage Fetherston, 1st Baronet, but had no children by her. His brother-in-law James Norreys died in 1718 and left the Norreys estates to Bertie's eldest son James.

Bertie died at Chesterton, Oxfordshire in 1734.

Parliament of England
| Preceded by Richard Lewis; Thomas Wancklyn | Member of Parliament for Westbury; 1678–1679; With: Richard Lewis | Succeeded by Richard Lewis; William Trenchard |
| Preceded by Richard Lewis; William Trenchard | Member of Parliament for Westbury; 1679–1680; With: Richard Lewis | Succeeded by Edward Norton; William Trenchard |
| Preceded by Sir Littleton Osbaldeston, Bt; Nicholas Bayntun | Member of Parliament for Woodstock; 1681–1685; With: Nicholas Bayntun | Succeeded by Richard Bertie; Sir Littleton Osbaldeston, Bt |
| Preceded by Brome Whorwood; William Wright | Member of Parliament for Oxford; 1685–1695; With: Sir George Pudsey 1685–1689; Sir Edward Norreys 1689–1695 | Succeeded by Sir Edward Norreys; Thomas Rowney |
| Preceded by Richard Lewis; Robert Bertie | Member of Parliament for Westbury; 1701–1702; With: Robert Bertie | Succeeded by William Trenchard; Thomas Phipps |
| Preceded by William Trenchard; Thomas Phipps | Member of Parliament for Westbury; 1702–1707; With: Robert Bertie | Succeeded by Parliament of Great Britain |
Parliament of Great Britain
| Preceded by Parliament of England | Member of Parliament for Westbury; 1707–1715; With: Robert Bertie 1707–1708; Francis Annesley 1708–1715 | Succeeded by Francis Annesley; Willoughby Bertie |
