= Oxfordshire Militia =

Auxiliary unit of the British Army

Oxfordshire Militia 4th (Oxford Militia) Bn, Oxfordshire Light Infantry 3rd (Reserve) Bn, Oxfordshire and Buckinghamshire Light Infantry
- Active: 1558–1 April 1953
- Country: England (1558–1707); Kingdom of Great Britain (1707–1800); United Kingdom (1801–1953)
- Branch: Militia/Special Reserve
- Role: Infantry
- Size: 1 Battalion
- Part of: Oxfordshire and Buckinghamshire Light Infantry
- Garrison/HQ: Cowley Barracks, Oxford
- Engagements: Monmouth Rebellion
- Battle honours: Mediterranean

The Oxfordshire Militia (Note: There is no consistency in the sources as to whether the regiment was the 'Oxford' or 'Oxfordshire' Militia, both forms being used indiscriminately.) was an auxiliary military force in the English county of Oxfordshire. From their formal organisation as Trained Bands in 1572, the Militia of Oxfordshire provided internal security and home defence during times of international tension and major wars, relieving regular troops from routine garrison duties and acting as a source of trained officers and men for the Regular Army. The Oxfordshire Militia was active in suppressing Monmouth's Rebellion in 1685 and served overseas at various times in Ireland and the Ionian Islands. It became a battalion of the Oxfordshire and Buckinghamshire Light Infantry and trained thousands of reservists and recruits during World War I. It maintained a shadowy existence until final disbandment in 1953.

== Early History ==
The English militia was descended from the Anglo-Saxon Fyrd, the military force raised from the freemen of the shires under command of their Sheriffs. The shire levies continued under the Norman kings, and were reorganised under the Assizes of Arms of 1181 and 1252, and again by King Edward I's Statute of Winchester of 1285. When invasion threatened in 1539 King Henry VIII held a Great Muster of all the counties, recording the number of armed men available in each Hundred, but although the muster for Oxfordshire was certified on 25 April the details have not survived.

== Oxfordshire Trained Bands ==
The legal basis of the militia was updated by two Acts of 1557 covering musters and the maintenance of horses and armour. The county militia was now under the Lord Lieutenant, assisted by the Deputy Lieutenants (DLs) and Justices of the Peace (JPs). The entry into force of these Acts in 1558 is seen as the starting date for the organised county militia in England. Oxfordshire was one of the southern counties called upon to send troops to suppress the Rising of the North in 1569. Although the militia obligation was universal, this assembly confirmed that it was impractical to train and equip every able-bodied man. After 1572 the practice was to select a proportion of men for the Trained Bands (TBs), who were mustered for regular training.

The threat of invasion during the Spanish War led to an increase in training. At first the government emphasised the 17 'maritime' counties most vulnerable to attack, and it was not until 1586 that the inland counties such as Oxfordshire were placed under lords-lieutenant and ordered to train. During the Spanish Armada crisis in 1588, the county supplied its 1144 trained men, organised into bands under captains, together with 23 lancers, 103 light horsemen, and 32 'petronels' (a petronel was an early cavalry firearm).

In the 16th Century little distinction was made between the militia and the troops levied by the counties for overseas expeditions, and between 1585 and 1601 Oxfordshire supplied 544 levies for service in Ireland, 440 for France and 650 for the Netherlands. However, the counties usually conscripted the unemployed and criminals rather than the Trained Bandsmen – in 1585 the Privy Council had ordered the impressment of able-bodied unemployed men, and the Queen ordered 'none of her trayned-bands to be pressed'. However, Oxfordshire was reprimanded in 1586 for levying vagabonds to rid the county of 'idle people', rather than helping the Queen's service. Men from Oxford were allowed 'conduct money' for eight days for the journey to Chester, the embarkation port for Ireland. Replacing the weapons issued to the levies from the militia armouries was a heavy burden on the counties: for one levy for Ireland Oxfordshire had to commandeer arms from citizens and pay them compensation.

With the passing of the threat of invasion, the trained bands declined in the early 17th Century. Later, King Charles I attempted to reform them into a national force or 'Perfect Militia' answering to the king rather than local control. In 1638 the Oxfordshire TBs consisted of 500 musketeers and 350 corslets (body armour, signifying pikeman); in addition the TB Horse comprised 40 lancers and 40 light horse.

=== Civil Wars ===
In 1639 and 1640 Charles attempted to employ the TBs for the Bishops' Wars in Scotland. However, many of those sent on this unpopular service were untrained replacements and conscripts, and many officers were corrupt or inefficient. For the Second Bishops' War of 1640 Oxfordshire was ordered to march 600 men to Newcastle upon Tyne. Once again, it seems that many of the trained bandsmen nationwide escaped service and raw substitutes were sent in their place. The Scottish campaign ended in failure.

Control of the TBs was one of the major points of dispute between Charles I and Parliament that led to the First English Civil War. When open warfare broke out in 1642 neither side made much use of the TBs beyond securing the county armouries for their own full-time troops who would serve anywhere in the country, many of whom were former trained bandsmen, or using the TBs as auxiliary units for garrisons. On 1 September the Oxford TBs prevented Royalist supporters and students from destroying Osney Bridge, but soon afterwards the city became the Royalist headquarters. In November 1643 the regiment was paraded on Bullingdon Green, but the men chose to be disarmed rather than turn out for the Royalists. Subsequently, the Royalists raised three auxiliary regiments for the defence of the city:

- Sir Nicholas Selwyn's Regiment of Foot, later Colonel William Legge's Regiment, known as the 'Oxford City Regiment', was raised from townsmen as a part-time garrison regiment in December 1643. Selwyn was a member of the Honourable Band of Gentlemen Pensioners; Legge was Governor of the city from January 1645. The regiment served at the storm of Thame in September 1645.
- The Earl of Dover's Oxford Auxiliary Regiment of Foot, known as the 'Regiment of Oxford Scholars' was raised in the city in April–May 1644 from 'scholars and strangers' at the University. Henry Carey, 1st Earl of Dover, had fought as a volunteer in the King's Lifeguard of Horse at the Battle of Edgehill.
- Lord Keeper Littleton's Oxford Auxiliary Regiment of Foot (later the Duke of York's) commissioned in April 1644, raised in May from members of the Inns of Court (lawyers) and their servants. Edward, 1st Lord Littleton, was Lord Keeper of the Great Seal until his death in August 1645, when the Duke of York became the regiment's nominal colonel. It served in the relief of Greenland House in July 1645.

All three regiments served through the Sieges of Oxford in May–June 1645 and May–June 1646, and were presumably disbanded after its surrender and evacuation by the regular Royalist army in June 1646.

As Parliament tightened its grip on the country after the Second English Civil War, it passed new Militia Acts in 1648 and 1650 that replaced lords lieutenant with county commissioners appointed by Parliament or the Council of State. From now on, the term 'Trained Band' began to disappear in most counties. Under the Commonwealth and Protectorate, the militia received pay when called out, and operated alongside the New Model Army to control the country. Many militia regiments were called out in 1651 during the Scottish invasion (the Worcester campaign) and in August the Oxfordshires were ordered to rendezvous with other Midland militia regiments at Northampton. The regiment did not fight at Worcester, but was probably with the 5000 militia held in reserve at Coventry.

== Restoration Militia ==
After the Restoration the English Militia was re-established by the Militia Act 1661 (13 Cha. 2 St. 1. c. 6) under the control of the king's lords lieutenants, the men to be selected by ballot. This was popularly seen as the 'Constitutional Force' to counterbalance a 'Standing Army' tainted by association with the New Model Army that had supported Cromwell's military dictatorship, and almost the whole burden of home defence and internal security was entrusted to the militia. Their duties included suppressing non-conformist religious assemblies: the Oxfordshires began breaking up meetings of Quakers in the county as soon as the order was given in 1660–61. The militia were also called out during the Anglo–Dutch wars.

=== Monmouth's Rebellion ===
There was a general muster of the militia in 1685 after the Duke of Monmouth landed at Lyme Regis on 11 June, launching the Monmouth Rebellion against King James II. The Earl of Abingdon as Lord-Lieutenant summoned the Oxfordshire Militia (a regiment of foot and a Troop of horse) who mustered at Oxford on 19 June. The horse, commanded by Abingdon's younger brother, Capt Henry Bertie, Member of Parliament for Oxford, rode out on 21 June towards the rebellion in the West Country. On 25 June the university resolved to raise volunteers to defend the city. A regiment of foot and a troop of horse were proposed, and on 28 June four waggon loads of muskets and pikes arrived from Windsor for the scholars to train with. Abingdon commanded and trained the horse himself. His eldest son, Lord Norreys, commanded the foot company raised at Christ Church College. Four other companies were raised by various colleges.

As the Royal army under the Earl of Feversham advanced into the West Country to meet the rebels, the Oxfordshire Militia first supported the Berkshire Militia at Reading in securing his lines of communication. The regiment then moved westwards, and when Monmouth summoned Bath on 26 June, it was held by a 500-strong garrison drawn from the Oxfordshire, Wiltshire and Somerset militia regiments, which defied him. Next day, during the Battle of Norton St Philip, the Oxfordshires were drawn up together with the Somerset, Dorset and Hampshire Militia while the Regulars attempted to take the village. Although the rebels repulsed this attack, they did not dare to attack Feversham's position, and continued their retreat. The Oxfordshires were not present at the final Battle of Sedgemoor on 6 July. The Oxfordshire Militia returned to their homes on 14 July and the university volunteers were stood down on the same day.

The most detailed account of the militia in this campaign contends that James II deliberately belittled their performance to play down Monmouth's skill and to bolster his own plans for a large army under his own control. After the suppression of the rebellion he suspended militia musters and planned to use the counties' weapons and militia taxes to equip and pay his expanding Regular Army, which he felt he could rely upon, unlike the locally commanded militia. He removed lords-lieutenant whom he did not trust, including the Earl of Abingdon from Oxfordshire. When William of Orange landed in the West Country in 1688 and marched against James, the militia did not stir against him, and the Earl of Abingdon was the first peer to join him. Abingdon was soon restored to the lord-lieutenancy.

In 1697 the counties were required to submit detailed lists of their militia. Under the Earl of Abingdon Oxfordshire had one foot regiment of 742 effective privates in eight companies commanded by Col Lord Norreys, and a troop of 130 horse under Capt Henry Bertie.

The militia were mustered for annual training until the Treaty of Utrecht and the accession of King George I, but after the Jacobite Rising of 1715 they passed into virtual abeyance.

== 1757 Reforms ==
Under threat of French invasion during the Seven Years' War a series of Militia Acts from 1757 reorganised the county militia regiments, the men being conscripted by means of parish ballots (paid substitutes were permitted) to serve for three years. In peacetime they assembled for 28 days' annual training. There was a property qualification for officers, who were commissioned by the lord lieutenant. An adjutant and drill sergeants were to be provided to each regiment from the Regular Army, and arms and accoutrements would be supplied when the county had secured 60 per cent of its quota of recruits.

Oxfordshire was assessed to raise 560 men in one regiment, but conscription by ballot was deeply unpopular in the Midland country districts and the necessity did not seem so urgent for inland counties like Oxfordshire, far from any potential invasion. While most English counties reformed their militia in 1759–60, the Oxfordshire gentry were apathetic, preferring to pay a large fine instead of raising their regiment. When the war ended in 1762 Oxfordshire was one of six defaulting counties still paying a fine. (Note: Some sources erroneously assume that the Oxfordshire Militia was actually reformed in 1759.)

=== American War of Independence ===
The militia was embodied after the outbreak of the War of American Independence when the country was threatened with invasion by the Americans' allies, France and Spain. Oxfordshire finally organised its regiment, and its arms were ordered to be issued on 31 July 1778. In 1779 the regiment was stationed at Dover, where it encountered difficulty in contracting a baker to supply the men with bread. In the summer of 1780 the Oxfordshires were in camp at Tiptree Heath in Essex, with two regular and six other militia regiments. The following summer the regiment, 600 strong, formed part of the 1st Brigade of the Plymouth garrison, accommodated in camp at Roborough Down. The Peace of Paris having been negotiated, the militia were sent to their home counties for disembodiment in March 1783.

From 1784 to 1792 the militia was kept up to strength by the ballot and was supposed to assemble for 28 days' training annually, even though to save money only two-thirds of the men were actually called out each year.

=== French Revolutionary War ===
The militia had already been embodied in December 1792 before Revolutionary France declared war on Britain on 1 February 1793. The French Revolutionary Wars saw a new phase for the English militia: they were embodied for a whole generation, and became regiments of full-time professional soldiers (though restricted to service in the British Isles), which the regular army increasingly saw as a prime source of recruits. They served in coast defences, manning garrisons, guarding prisoners of war, and for internal security, while their traditional local defence duties were taken over by the Volunteers and mounted Yeomanry.

In June 1793 the regiment, with 9 companies, joined a large militia training encampment at Broadwater Common, Waterdown Forest, outside Tunbridge Wells. The whole camp moved to Ashdown Forest at the beginning of August and then to Brighton for two weeks before returning to Broadwater Common. The camp broke up in the autumn.

The high price of food in southern England in the spring of 1795 caused a mutiny in the regiment. On 16 April 400 men marched with fixed bayonets into Seaford, seized meat and beer and sold it cheaply to the poor. They were loading artillery waggons with flour and wheat, which they also intended to sell cheaply to the poor, before they were stopped. Although the mutiny was carried out in an orderly manner, all were tried by a court martial presided over by Col Hans Sloane of the North Hampshire Militia and were found guilty. Three ringleaders were condemned to death, of which one had his sentence commuted to 10 years' transportation to New South Wales; a further man was sentenced to 1500 lashes.

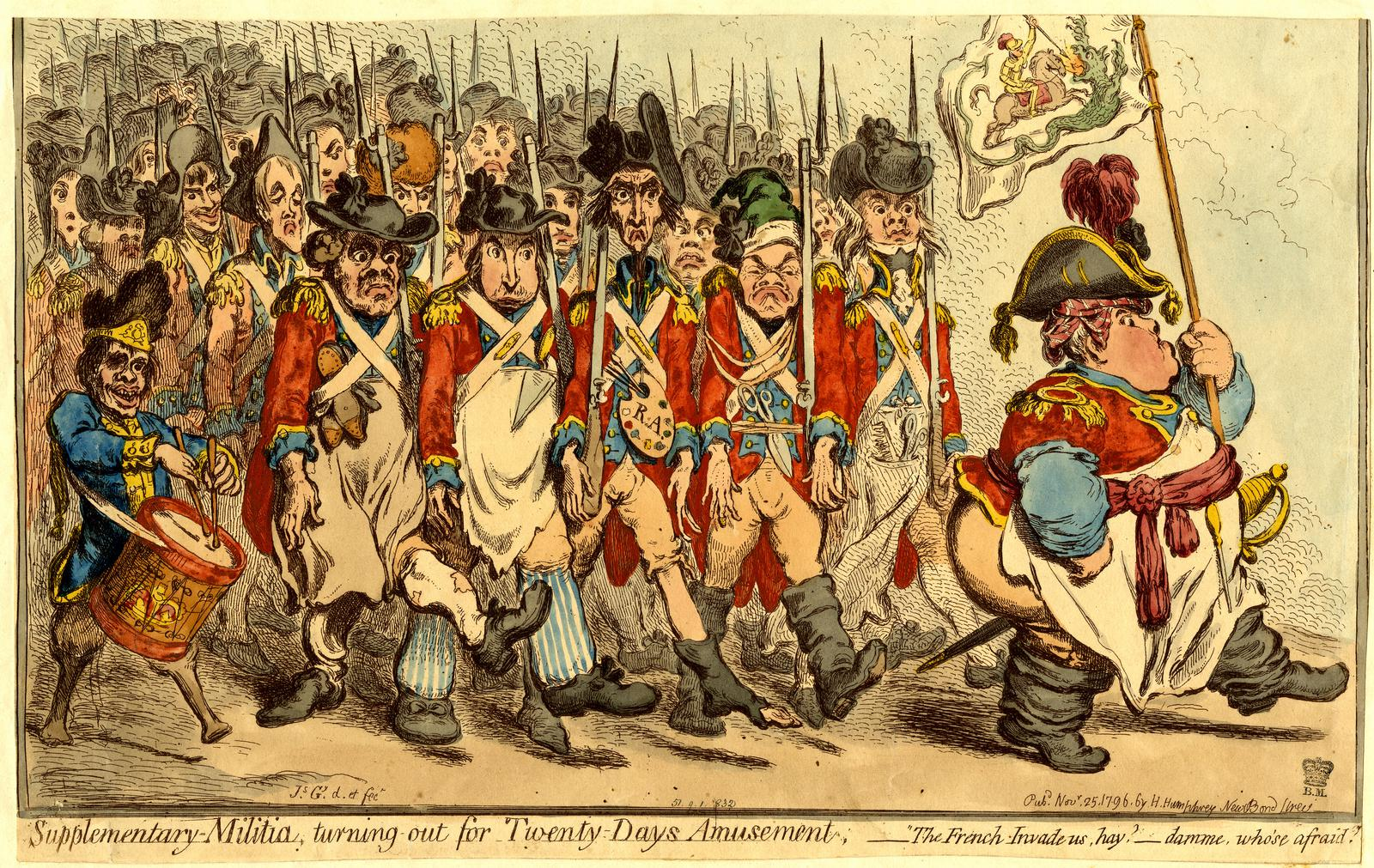
Supplementary-Militia, turning-out for Twenty Days Amusement: 1796 caricature by James Gillray.

In an attempt to have as many men as possible under arms for home defence in order to release regulars, the Government created the Supplementary Militia in 1796, a compulsory levy of men to be trained in their spare time, and to be incorporated in the Militia in emergency. Oxfordshire's additional quota was fixed at 852 men. The lieutenancies were required to carry out 20 days' initial training as soon as possible, which was carried out by drill teams provided by the regular county militia. The Duke of Marlborough as Lord-Lieutenant commissioned a number of additional officers for the Oxfordshire Supplementary Militia early in 1797. The supplementary militia were called out in two halves in February and August 1798 to augment the regular militia.

In the summer of 1798 the Irish Rebellion became serious, and the French were sending help to the rebels. The Oxfordshire was among the militia regiments that volunteered to serve in Ireland and once the necessary legislation was passed by parliament it was one of 13 regiments whose offer was accepted. It served there under the command of Col Lord Charles Spencer, MP, while the last embers of the rebellion were put down. William Gore-Langton, MP, was appointed the regiment's colonel on 24 October 1798. However, at the end of the year when they were asked to stay on into 1799, the Oxfordshires refused, though some impression was made on them by threats and lavish supplies of ale. They eventually agreed to stay until Christmas 1799 if they were afterwards stationed near their own county and able to see their families.

The Treaty of Amiens was signed in March 1802 and the militia were disembodied. The Supplementary Militia had been stood down in 1799, the discharged men being encouraged to enlist in the Regular Army. In 1802 Oxfordshire's quota was reduced to 602.

=== Napoleonic Wars ===
The Peace of Amiens proving short-lived, the militia were re-embodied in March 1803. The Oxfordshire regiment marched into Dover to join the garrison that spring, and they were still there in June 1804. During the summer of 1805, when Napoleon was massing his 'Army of England' at Boulogne for a projected invasion, the Oxfordshires, with 640 men in 8 companies under Lt-Col J.H. Telson (second-in-command since 4 June 1803), were stationed at Colchester Barracks as part of a militia brigade under Brigadier-General Lord Montgomerie.

=== Local Militia ===
While the Regular Militia were the mainstay of national defence during the Napoleonic Wars, they were supplemented from 1808 by the Local Militia, which were part-time and only to be used within their own districts. These were raised to counter the declining numbers of Volunteers, and if their ranks could not be filled voluntarily the militia ballot was employed. They were to be trained once a year. Oxfordshire formed a number of regiments. Edwin Sandys was appointed Lt-Col Commandant of the 'Central Regiment' on 17 May 1809. and the King commissioned adjutants to the 'Southern' and 'North' regimens' in July and August. In August the Lord-Lieutenant commissioned Lt-Col William Hodges and a number of other officers to the 'East or Central Regiment'. Eventually the Oxfordshire regiments settled down as:

- 1st or Western Regiment
- 2nd or Southern Regiment
- 3rd or Northern Regiment – Lt-Col William Harvey, later Col Hon Thomas Parker
- 4th or Eastern Regiment – Lt-Col William Hodges

=== Ireland again ===
In 1813 the Oxfordshire Militia again volunteered for service in Ireland and in 1814 it was stationed at Spike Island, County Cork, Fort Carlisle and Counden fort. It was there when the Allies entered Paris and Napoleon abdicated.

Many militia regiments were disembodied at the apparent end of the war in 1814, but the Oxfordshires were still serving in 1815 when Napoleon escaped from Elba and initiated the final Waterloo campaign. The regiment was finally disembodied in February 1816.

=== Long Peace ===
After Waterloo there was another long peace. Although ballots were still held until they were suspended by the Militia Act 1829, the regiments were rarely assembled for training and the permanent staffs of sergeants and drummers (who were occasionally used to maintain public order) were progressively reduced. Officers continued to be commissioned sporadically; in 1845–46 there was an effort to replace elderly members of the permanent staff and to appoint a few younger officers from the county gentry, though they had no duties to perform. George Spencer, 4th Duke of Marlborough as lord-lieutenant appointed a number of new company officers to the Oxfordshire militia. In April 1847, following the death of Col Gore-Langton after 48 years in command, all the Field officers were new appointments: Charles Oldfield Bowles as colonel, John Fane, lieutenant-colonel, and the Hon Henry Spencer, major.

== 1852 Reforms ==
The Militia of the United Kingdom was revived by the Militia Act 1852, enacted during a renewed period of international tension. As before, units were raised and administered on a county basis, and filled by voluntary enlistment (although conscription by means of the Militia Ballot might be used if the counties failed to meet their quotas). Training was for 56 days on enlistment, then for 21–28 days per year, during which the men received full army pay. The Militia was transferred from the Home Office to the War Office (WO). Under the Act, militia units could be embodied by Royal Proclamation for full-time home defence service in three circumstances:

1. 'Whenever a state of war exists between Her Majesty and any foreign power'.
2. 'In all cases of invasion or upon imminent danger thereof'.
3. 'In all cases of rebellion or insurrection'.

New younger officers, many of them ex-Regulars, were appointed to the revived regiments, including the Hon Percy Barrington, formerly of the Grenadier Guards, and the Hon Algernon Annesley (younger son of Viscount Valentia) formerly of the 10th Hussars, both commissioned as captains in the Oxfordshires.

=== Crimean War ===
The Crimean War having broken out and a large expeditionary force sent overseas, the militia were called out for home defence. The Oxfordshire regiment was embodied on 6 December 1854. At first it was stationed at Oxford, but by May 1855 it was at Portsmouth. The regiment then volunteered for overseas garrison duty and was stationed at Corfu in the Ionian Islands. After the signing of the Treaty of Paris in March 1856 it was returned to England and was disembodied in July. For this service it was awarded the Battle honour Mediterranean.

The Oxfordshires were called out again for garrison duty when much of the army was sent to quell the Indian Mutiny. The regiment was embodied in September 1857 and by December it was stationed at Woolwich and Tilbury Fort. In June 1858 it moved to Aldershot Camp, where it stayed until July 1859 when it moved to Dover. It was disembodied in February 1860.

As part of the 1852 reforms, the position of Colonel of the Regiment in the militia was abolished and the lieutenant-colonel became commanding officer (CO). After the death of the last colonel, Charles Bowles, Lt-Col Fane was granted the title of Lt-Col Commandant on 18 July 1862. He was succeeded by the Hon Algernon Annesley on 22 May 1872.

Over the following years the regiment was mustered each year for 21 or 28 days' training. Militia battalions now had a large cadre of permanent staff (about 30) and a number of the officers were former Regulars. Around a third of the recruits and many young officers went on to join the Regular Army. The Militia Reserve introduced in 1867 consisted of present and former militiamen who undertook to serve overseas in case of war.

As an experiment in May 1867 the annual training was held at Aldershot in conjunction with the regular division stationed there; the Oxfordshires were attached to 1st Brigade. The camp ended with a divisional field day and was considered a success, being repeated the following year. In 1869 the training routine was varied when the Oxfordshire Militia were brigaded with other militia regiments from surrounding counties for a review in Woburn Park. In 1870 and 1873 the regiment trained at Aldershot again.

== Cardwell and Childers reforms ==
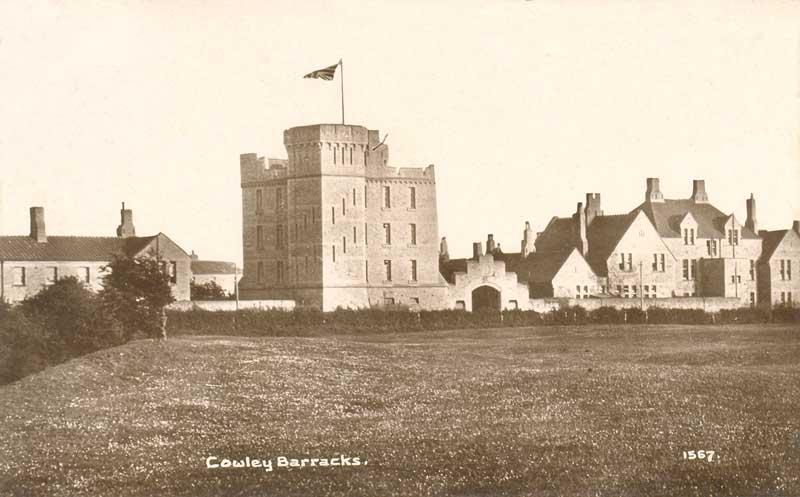
Cowley Barracks, Oxford.

Under the 'Localisation of the Forces' scheme introduced by the Cardwell Reforms of 1872, militia regiments were brigaded with their local Regular and Volunteer battalions. For the Oxfordshire Militia this was in Sub-District No 42 (Counties of Oxfordshire & Bucks):

- 52nd (Oxfordshire) Light Infantry
- 85th Regiment of Foot (Bucks Volunteers)
- Royal Buckinghamshire Militia (King's Own) at High Wycombe
- Oxfordshire Militia at Oxford
- 1st (Oxford University) Oxfordshire Rifle Volunteer Corps at Oxford
- 1st Administrative Battalion, Oxfordshire Rifle Volunteer Corps (later 2nd Oxfordshire RVC) at Oxford
- 1st Administrative Battalion, Buckinghamshire Rifle Volunteer Corps at Great Marlow

Cowley Barracks was built in 1876 as the brigade depot at Bullingdon Green (the traditional muster place of the Oxfordshire Militia). Following the Cardwell Reforms a mobilisation scheme began to appear in the Army List from December 1875. This assigned Regular and Militia units to places in an order of battle of corps, divisions and brigades for the 'Active Army', even though these formations were entirely theoretical, with no staff or services assigned. The Oxfordshire Militia were assigned to 1st Brigade of 3rd Division, V Corps. The division would have mustered at Gloucester in time of war, and did actually undertake collective training at Minchinhampton Common in 1876 during the international crisis that led to the Russo-Turkish War; the Militia Reserve were also called out during this crisis.

=== 4th Battalion, Oxfordshire Light Infantry ===
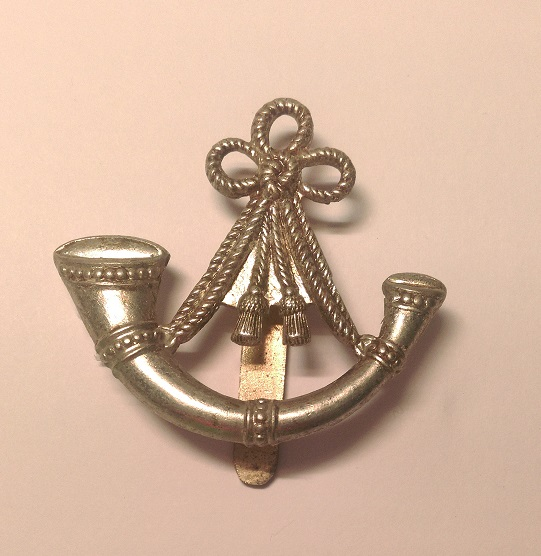
The stringed bugle-horn cap badge of the Oxfordshire and Buckinghamshire Light Infantry.

The Childers Reforms of 1881 completed the Cardwell process by converting the Regular regiments into two-battalion county regiments, each with two militia battalions. The 'Ox & Bucks' link between the 52nd and 85th Foot was broken: instead the 43rd (Monmouthshire) Light Infantry became the 1st Battalion, the 52nd the 2nd Battalion of the new Oxfordshire Light Infantry. The Royal Bucks Militia became the 3rd Battalion and the Oxfordshires became the 4th (Oxford Militia) Battalion. The Hon Algernon Annesley (who held the personal rank of honorary colonel) retained the command of the 4th Bn until 1891 when he was succeeded by Lt-Col Charles Bulkeley and became the battalion's first Honorary Colonel.

=== Second Boer War ===
When the bulk of the Regular Army was sent to South Africa at the outbreak of the Second Boer War, the Militia Reserve was called out as reinforcements, followed by the militia battalions for home defence. The 4th Oxfordshire LI were embodied from 1 May 1900 to 3 July 1901.

== Special Reserve ==
After the Boer War, the future of the militia was called into question. There were moves to reform the Auxiliary Forces (Militia, Yeomanry and Volunteers) to take their place in the six Army Corps proposed by the Secretary of State for War, St John Brodrick. However, little of Brodrick's scheme was carried out. Under the more sweeping Haldane Reforms of 1908, the Militia was replaced by the Special Reserve (SR), a semi-professional force whose role was to provide reinforcement drafts for regular units serving overseas in wartime, rather like the earlier Militia Reserve. The 3rd (Buckinghamshire Militia) Bn was disbanded on 31 July 1908 and the 4th (Oxford Militia) Bn became the 3rd (Reserve) Battalion. At the same time the regiment was renamed the Oxfordshire and Buckinghamshire Light Infantry, known as the 'OBLI' or 'Ox and Bucks'.

=== 3rd (Reserve) Battalion ===
On the outbreak of World War I on 4 August 1914 3rd (Reserve) Bn OBLI mobilised at Cowley Barracks under the command of Lt-Col Francis Higgins-Bernard, who had been CO since 31 March 1912, and went to its war station at Portsmouth. Here it carried out its twin roles of coast defence and training drafts of reservists and new recruits for the Regular battalions serving overseas (1st Bn in Mesopotamia, 2nd Bn on the Western Front). It also formed 9th Bn OBLI (see below). The second-in-command, Major James Blyth, was promoted to Lt-Col and took over as CO on 1 January 1917. In October 1917 the battalion was moved to Dover where it remained part of the garrison until the end of the war. The remaining personnel were drafted to the 2nd Bn on 1 August 1919 and 3rd Bn was formally disembodied on 7 September 1919.

=== 9th (Reserve) Battalion ===
After Lord Kitchener issued his call for volunteers in August 1914, the battalions of the 1st, 2nd and 3rd New Armies ('K1', 'K2' and 'K3' of 'Kitchener's Army') were quickly formed at the regimental depots. The SR battalions also swelled with new recruits and were soon well above their establishment strength. On 8 October 1914 each SR battalion was ordered to use the surplus to form a service battalion of the 4th New Army ('K4'). Accordingly, the 3rd (Reserve) Bn at Portsmouth formed the 9th (Service) Battalion on 31 October, which became part of 96th Brigade in 32nd Division and began training for active service. Colonel Frederick Hawkins became its CO on 12 November. In the spring of 1915 the WO decided to convert the K4 battalions into 2nd Reserve units, providing drafts for the K1–K3 battalions in the same way that the SR was doing for the Regular battalions. On 10 April 1915 the 9th OBLI became 9th (Reserve) Battalion, and 96th Brigade became 8th Reserve Brigade at Wareham. 9th (R) Battalion trained drafts for the 5th, 6th and 7th (Service) Bns of the regiment serving on the Western Front and the 8th (Pioneer) Bn at Salonika. Colonel Hawkins left on 14 July 1915 and was replaced on 7 August by Col James Dyas. On 1 September 1916 the 2nd Reserve battalions were transferred to the Training Reserve (TR) and the battalion was redesignated as 36th Training Reserve Bn, still in 8th Reserve Bde at Wareham. The training staff retained their OBLI badges. On 22 November 1917 the battalion became 36th (Recruit Distribution) Bn, TR, and remained in this role for the rest of the war (though the word 'recruit' was dropped from its title on 25 June 1918). It was disbanded at Fovant on 28 February 1919.

=== Postwar ===
The SR resumed its old title of Militia in 1921 but like most militia units the 3rd OBLI remained in abeyance after World War I. By the outbreak of World War II in 1939, no officers remained listed for the 3rd Bn. The Militia was formally disbanded in April 1953.

== Heritage & ceremonial ==
=== Uniforms & Insignia ===
Once source records that when it was raised in 1778 the regiment wore red coats with green facings. However, in 1780 and 1781 the facings were black. (Note: There was a regimental tradition that the facings were changed from blue to black after the mutiny of 1795, but there is no evidence that the regiment ever wore the blue facings of a 'Royal' regiment.) In 1804 the facings were yellow and remained so until 1876 when they were changed to buff. When it became a battalion of the Oxfordshire LI it adopted that regiment's white facings.

The regimental badge was an ox crossing a ford, which appears in the Coat of arms of Oxford, with a scroll beneath inscribed 'OXFORDSHIRE'. The city's motto Fortis est veritas ('The truth is strong') also appeared on some badges. The early shoulder-belt plates worn by officers had an ox within a crowned wreath with the title 'OXFORD' underneath. By 1840 the shoulder-belt plate bore the full arms of the city with supporters and motto. The officers' waistbelt plate of 1855–81 had the Royal cypher and crown within a circle inscribed 'Fortis est veritas' and '51'. Early pewter buttons of ca 1800 had the Royal cypher within a crowned Garter inscribed 'OXFORDSHIRE', all on an eight-pointed star. Later buttons had a circle inscribed 'OXFORD MILITIA' around a crown. From 1881 the battalion adopted the insignia of the parent regiment, including its simple stringed bugle-horn cap badge.

=== Precedence ===
During the War of American Independence the militia were given an order of precedence by counties determined by ballot each year. For Oxfordshire the positions were:

- 8th on 1 June 1778
- 16th on12 May 1779
- 14th on 6 May 1780
- 17th on 28 April 1781
- 1st on 7 May 1782

The militia order of precedence balloted for in 1793 (Oxfordshire was 9th) remained in force throughout the French Revolutionary War. Another ballot for precedence took place in 1803 at the start of the Napoleonic War and remained in force until 1833: Oxfordshire was 12th. In 1833 the King drew the lots for individual regiments and the resulting list continued in force with minor amendments until the end of the militia. The regiments raised before the peace of 1763 took the first 47 places; the Oxfordshires were in the next group raised between the Peace of 1763 and the Peace of 1783, and became 51st. Most regiments took little notice of the numeral, but the Oxfordshires' officers wore it on their waistbelt.

=== Honorary Colonels ===
As part of the 1852 reforms, the position of Colonel of the Regiment in the militia was abolished. However, militia regiments were permitted to appoint an Honorary Colonel. For the Oxfordshires these were:

- Hon Algernon Annesley, former CO, appointed 12 December 1891
- Charles Spencer-Churchill, 9th Duke of Marlborough, TD, appointed 14 June 1908

=== Battle Honour ===
The regiment's colours bore the battle honour Mediterranean awarded for its overseas service in the Crimean War. However, this was rescinded in 1910 when the SR battalions assumed the same honours as their parent regiments.

== See also ==
- Trained Bands
- Militia (English)
- Militia (Great Britain)
- Militia (United Kingdom)
- Special Reserve
- Royal Buckinghamshire Militia (King's Own)
- Oxfordshire and Buckinghamshire Light Infantry

== Bibliography ==
- W.Y. Baldry, 'Order of Precedence of Militia Regiments', Journal of the Society for Army Historical Research, Vol 15, No 57 (Spring 1936), pp. 5–16.
- Ian F.W. Beckett, The Amateur Military Tradition 1558–1945, Manchester: Manchester University Press, 1991, ISBN 0-7190-2912-0/Barnsley: Pen & Sword, 2011.
- Lindsay Boynton, The Elizabethan Militia 1558–1638, London: Routledge & Keegan Paul, 1967.
- Lt-Col Sir John M. Burgoyne, Bart, Regimental Records of the Bedfordshire Militia 1759–1884, London: W.H. Allen, 1884.
- W.Y. Carman, 'Militia Uniforms 1780', Journal of the Society for Army Historical Research, Vol 36, No 147 (September 1958), pp. 108–9.
- Andrew Clark (ed), The Life and Times of Anthony Wood, antiquary, of Oxford, 1632–1695, described by Himself, Vol III: 1682–1695, Oxford: Clarendon Press, 1894.
- Maj Wilfred Joseph Cripps (revised by Capt Hon M.H. Hicks-Beach & Maj B.N. Spraggett), The Royal North Gloucester Militia, 2nd Edn, Cirencester: Wilts & Gloucestershire Standard Printing Works, 1914.
- C.G. Cruickshank, Elizabeth's Army, 2nd Edn, Oxford: Oxford University Press, 1966.
- Capt John Davis, Historical Records of the Second Royal Surrey or Eleventh Regiment of Militia, London: Marcus Ward, 1877.
- Col John K. Dunlop, The Development of the British Army 1899–1914, London: Methuen, 1938.
- Mark Charles Fissel, The Bishops' Wars: Charles I's campaigns against Scotland 1638–1640, Cambridge: Cambridge University Press, 1994, ISBN 0-521-34520-0.
- Sir John Fortescue, A History of the British Army, Vol I, 2nd Edn, London: Macmillan, 1910.
- Sir John Fortescue, A History of the British Army, Vol II, London: Macmillan, 1899.
- Sir John Fortescue, A History of the British Army, Vol III, 2nd Edn, London: Macmillan, 1911.
- J.B.M. Frederick, Lineage Book of British Land Forces 1660–1978, Vol I, Wakefield: Microform Academic, 1984, ISBN 1-85117-007-3.
- A.W. Haarmann, 'Regulars and Militia at Plymouth and Vicinity, 1781', Journal of the Society for Army Historical Research, Vol 52, No 209 (Spring 1974), p. 57.
- Lt-Col H.G. Hart, The New Annual Army List, and Militia List (various dates from 1840).
- Col Sir Charles Harvey, The History of the 4th Battalion Norfolk Regiment (late East Norfolk Militia), London: Jarrold, 1899.
- Col George Jackson Hay, An Epitomized History of the Militia (The Constitutional Force), London: United Service Gazette, 1905/Ray Westlake Military Books, 1987, ISBN 0-9508530-7-0/Uckfield: Naval & Military Press, 2015 ISBN 978-1-78331-171-2.
- Richard Holmes, Soldiers: Army Lives and Loyalties from Redcoats to Dusty Warriors, London: HarperPress, 2011, ISBN 978-0-00-722570-5.
- Brig E.A. James, British Regiments 1914–18, London: Samson Books, 1978, ISBN 0-906304-03-2/Uckfield: Naval & Military Press, 2001, ISBN 978-1-84342-197-9.
- Roger Knight, Britain Against Napoleon: The Organization of Victory 1793–1815, London: Allen Lane, 2013/Penguin, 2014, ISBN 978-0-141-03894-0.
- N.B. Leslie, Battle Honours of the British and Indian Armies 1695–1914, London: Leo Cooper, 1970, ISBN 0-85052-004-5.
- Lord Macaulay, The History of England from the Accession of James the Second, Popular Edn, London:Longman, 1895.
- F. W. Maitland, The Constitutional History of England, Cambridge: Cambridge University Press, 1931.
- H. Moyse-Bartlett, 'Dover at War', Journal of the Society for Army Historical Research, 1972, Vol 50, No 203 (Autumn 1972), pp. 131–54.
- H.G. Parkyn, 'English Militia Regiments 1757–1935: Their Badges and Buttons', Journal of the Society for Army Historical Research, Vol 15, No 60 (Winter 1936), pp. 216–248.
- Capt B.E. Sargeaunt, The Royal Monmouthshire Militia, London: RUSI, 1910/Uckfield: Naval & Military Press, nd, ISBN 978-1-78331204-7.
- Christopher L. Scott, The military effectiveness of the West Country Militia at the time of the Monmouth Rebellion, Cranfield University PhD thesis 2011.
- Arthur Sleigh, The Royal Militia and Yeomanry Cavalry Army List, April 1850, London: British Army Despatch Press, 1850/Uckfield: Naval and Military Press, 1991, ISBN 978-1-84342-410-9.
- Edward M. Spiers, The Army and Society 1815–1914, London: Longmans, 1980, ISBN 0-582-48565-7.
- Maj Robert Bell Turton, The History of the North York Militia, now known as the Fourth Battalion Alexandra Princess of Wales's Own (Yorkshire Regiment), Leeds: Whitehead, 1907/Stockton-on-Tees: Patrick & Shotton, 1973, ISBN 0-903169-07-X.
- War Office, A List of the Officers of the Militia, the Gentlemen & Yeomanry Cavalry, and Volunteer Infantry of the United Kingdom, 11th Edn, London: War Office, 14 October 1805/Uckfield: Naval and Military Press, 2005, ISBN 978-1-84574-207-2.
- J.R. Western, The English Militia in the Eighteenth Century: The Story of a Political Issue 1660–1802, London: Routledge & Kegan Paul, 1965.

=== External sources ===
- Chris Baker, The Long, Long Trail
- Steve Brown, Home Guard: The Forces to Meet the Expected French Invasion/1 September 1805 at The Napoleon Series (archived at the Wayback Machine).
- Peter Hodgkinson, Infantry Battalion Commanding Officers of the British Armies in the First World War (archived at the Wayback Machine).
- T.F. Mills, Land Forces of Britain, the Empire and Commonwealth – Regiments.org (archived at the Wayback Machine)
- David Plant, British Civil Wars, Commonwealth & Protectorate, 1638–1660 (The BCW Project) Regimental Wiki.
