= William Brouncker (Westbury MP, died 1680) =

Member of the Parliament of England

William Brouncker (c. 1620 – 1680) was an English politician who sat in the House of Commons in 1660.

Brouncker was the son of William Brouncker of Erlestoke, Wiltshire and his wife Anne Dauntsey, daughter of Sir John Dauntsey of Bishop's Lavington in the same county. He succeeded his father before 1650.

He was J.P. for Wiltshire from 1652 to 1653. In 1660 he was elected Member of Parliament for Westbury in the Convention Parliament; the seat had previously been represented by his great-grandfather Sir William Brouncker. He was JP for Wiltshire again from March 1660 to about 1663 and commissioner for assessment from August 1660 until his death. By 1661 he was major in the foot militia.

In 1677 he sold the manor of Erlestoke to Richard Mason, but retained the manorhouse.

Brouncker died at the age of about 60.

He married, by licence dated 24 September 1644, Katherine Moore, daughter of Thomas Moore of Hawkchurch, Devon, and had three sons and two daughters. In 1689 his youngest son Dauntsey (d. 1693) recovered the manor from Sir Stephen Fox.

Parliament of England
Preceded by Not represented in Restored Rump	Member of Parliament for Westbury; 1660; With: Richard Lewis	Succeeded by Richard Lewis; Thomas Wancklyn
