= Richard Lewis (English MP) =

English politician (1627–1706)

Richard Lewis (c. 1627 – 1 October 1706) was an English landowner and politician who sat in the House of Commons between 1660 and 1702 and a member of the Lewis Of the Van Family.

== Early life ==
Lewis was the third son of Sir Edward Lewis, a courtier, and his wife Lady Anne Sackville, daughter of Robert Sackville, 2nd Earl of Dorset and widow of Edward, Lord Beauchamp. His father Sir Edward Lewis was of The Van family, Glamorgan and Edington Priory, Wiltshire and died in 1630. He was commissioner for assessment for Wiltshire from January 1660 to 1680 and commissioner for militia for Wiltshire in March 1660.

== Political career ==
In April 1660, he was elected Member of Parliament for Westbury in the Convention Parliament. He was J.P. for Wiltshire from July 1660 to June 1688. In 1661 he was re-elected MP for Westbury in the Cavalier Parliament. He was lieutenant-colonel of foot militia for Wiltshire in 1661. From 1662 to 1663 he was commissioner for corporations. He was Deputy Lieutenant from 1668 to June 1688.

In 1674 Lewis succeeded to the family estates on the death of his nephew Edward Lewis and became a J.P. for Glamorgan until 1682. He was commissioner for assessment for Monmouthshire and Glamorgan from 1677 to 1680. He was re-elected MP for Westbury in the two elections of 1679. He became a colonel in the militia in 1681 and was sheriff from 1681 to 1682. In 1684 he was freeman of Devizes. In 1685 he was elected MP for Westbury again. He was J.P. for Glamorgan from 1685 to 1696 and commissioner for rebels’ estates in Wiltshire in 1686. He was displaced as freeman of Devizes by order-in-council in 1687. He was J.P. for Wiltshire and Deputy Lieutenant from October 1688 to 1696. He was commissioner for assessment for Monmouthshire, Wiltshire and Glamorgan from 1689 to 1690. He was re-elected MP for Westbury in 1689, 1690, 1695 and 1698. In 1696 he was removed from the lieutenancy for refusing the Association. He was J.P. for Glamorgan and Wiltshire from 1700 until his death. In February 1701 he was elected MP for Westbury again.

== Death ==
Lewis died in 1706, in his "eighty-third year", and was buried at Corsham.

Lewis married Mary James, daughter of Giles James of Sherston, Wiltshire and had three sons and two daughters. His son Thomas sat for various Hampshire and Wiltshire constituencies. His brother William was MP for Devizes.

Parliament of England
Preceded by Not represented in Restored Rump	Member of Parliament for Westbury; 1660–1680; With: William Brouncker 1660; Thomas Wancklyn 1661–1678; Henry Bertie 1678–1679; William Trenchard 1679; Henry Bertie 1679–1680	Succeeded by Edward Norton; William Trenchard
Preceded by William Trenchard; John Ashe	Member of Parliament for Westbury; 1685–1702; With: James Herbert 1685–1689; Peregrine Bertie 1689–1695; Robert Bertie 1695–1701; Henry Bertie 1701–1702	Succeeded by William Trenchard; Thomas Phipps
