= Richard Bertie (soldier) =

English soldier and Member of Parliament

Captain Richard Bertie (ca. 1635 – 19 January 1686) was an English soldier and Member of Parliament. Soon after serving in the royal forces that suppressed the Monmouth Rebellion, he was deprived of his commission for opposing James II's plan to commission Roman Catholic officers. Returned to Parliament for Woodstock in 1685 on the interest of his half-brother, Lord Abingdon, he died within a year.

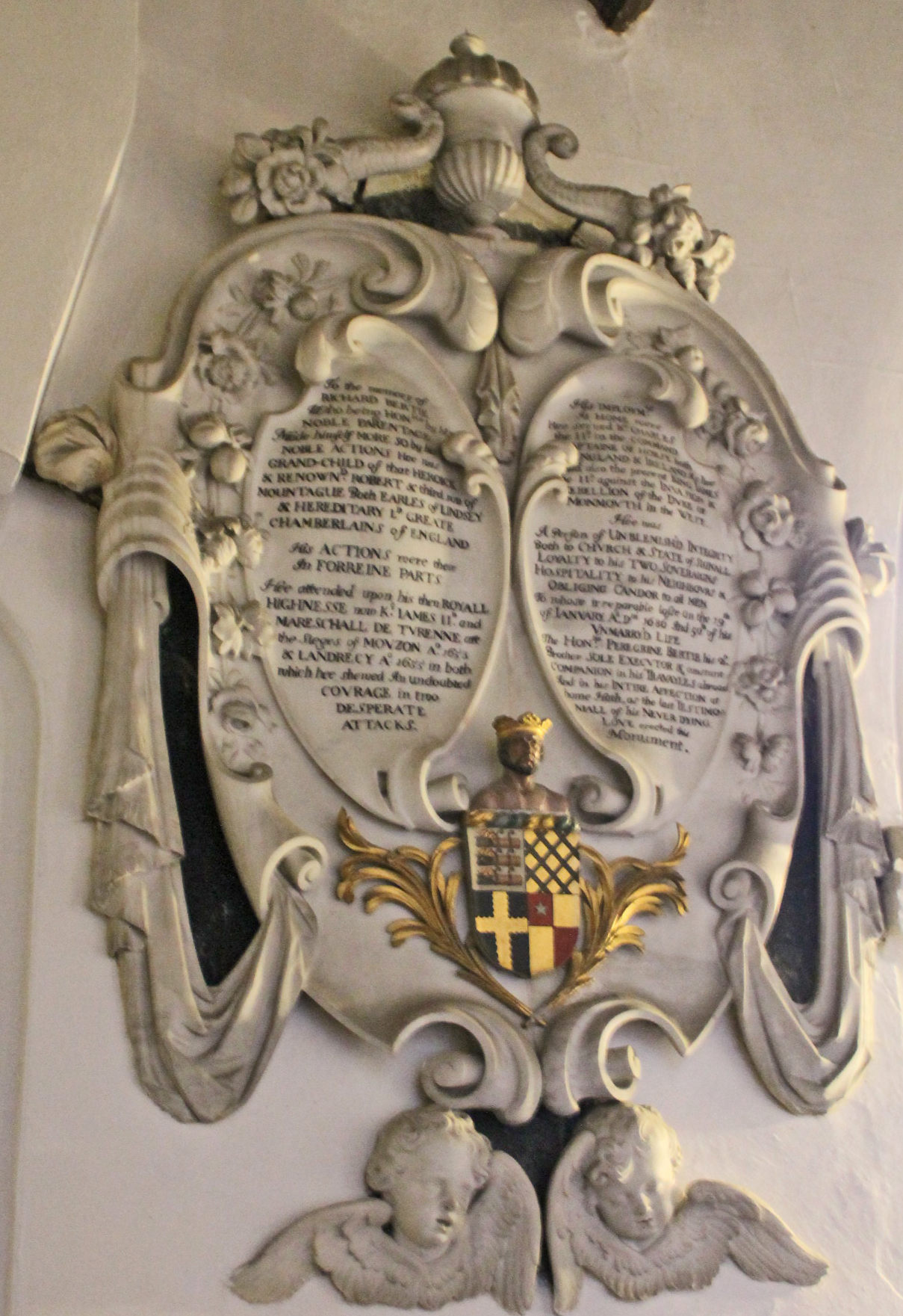
Memorial to Richard Bertie in Edenham church

The third son of Montagu Bertie, 2nd Earl of Lindsey, his father sent him out of the country after the execution of Charles I in 1649. Richard and his elder brother Peregrine traveled through Europe until September 1653, when he was commended by Charles II to his brother, the Duke of York. Richard served under York in French military service, fighting at the sieges of Mouzon in 1653 and Landrecies in 1655. After the English Restoration, Bertie returned to England and was admitted to the Middle Temple, but did not pursue legal studies. Instead, he received a commission as a captain of horse in the Irish army from the Duke of Ormond in 1663, which he held until at least 1680. He was a commissioner for assessment in Lincolnshire, his family's traditional stronghold, from 1673 to 1680, and was appointed a justice of the peace in Lincolnshire and Northamptonshire in 1680. The interest of his half-brother Lord Abingdon, the Lord Lieutenant of Oxfordshire, procured his return as Member of Parliament for Woodstock in March 1685, where he had been created a freeman in 1680. He was also created a freeman of Oxford in 1685.

At the outbreak of the Monmouth Rebellion in June 1685, Bertie served as captain of an independent troop of horse. His half-brother Charles remarked that Richard's old commander York, now King James II, "calls my brother Dick his old fellow-soldier, and intends him more than a troop". However, both Richard and his younger half-brother Captain Henry Bertie lost their commissions in December 1685 for failing to support the King's program of installing Roman Catholic army officers. He died on 19 January 1685/6, unmarried, and was buried at Edenham.

Parliament of England
Preceded by Nicholas Bayntun; Henry Bertie	Member of Parliament for Woodstock; 1685–1686; With: Sir Littleton Osbaldeston, Bt	Succeeded by Sir Thomas Littleton, Bt; Sir John D'Oyly, Bt
