= Richard Bertie =

Richard Bertie may refer to:

- Richard Bertie (courtier) (c. 1517–1582), husband of Katherine Willoughby, duchess of Suffolk
- Richard Bertie (soldier) (c. 1635–1686), English soldier and member of Parliament
- Richard Bertie, 14th Earl of Lindsey (born 1931), British peer
