= Peregrine Bertie (senior) =

English politician

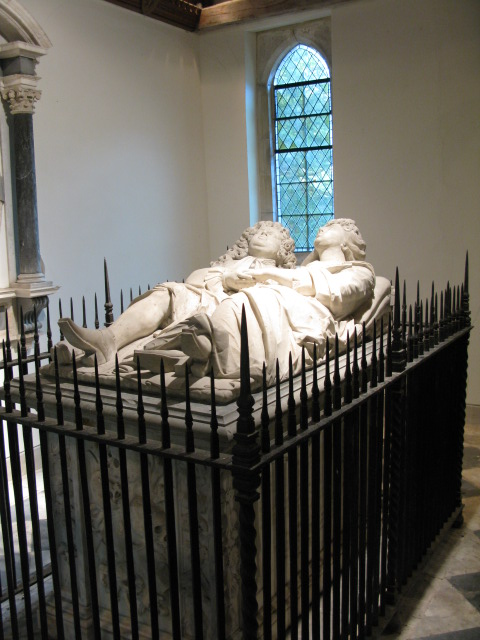
Monument of Peregrine Bertie and his wife, Susan Monins

Peregrine Bertie (ca. 1634 – 3 January 1701) was an English politician, the second son of Montagu Bertie, 2nd Earl of Lindsey. A member of the court party, later the Tories, he sat for Stamford from 1665 to 1679, and from 1685 to 1687. Most active in Parliament during the 1670s, he and other members of his family were consistent political supporters of Bertie's brother-in-law, the Duke of Leeds throughout several reigns. While he never achieved significant political stature, he did hold several minor government offices: he was a captain in the Royal Regiment of Horse Guards until 1679, and a commissioner of the Alienation Office and a customs officer. The death of his wife's brother brought the couple an estate in Waldershare, Kent, where Bertie ultimately settled. He sat for Westbury after the Glorious Revolution, but showed little political activity compared to others of his family. Bertie stood down from Parliament in 1695 and died in 1701, leaving two daughters.

== Early life ==
He and his younger brother Richard left England after the death of Charles I. As a volunteer with the Duke of York in French service, he fought under the command of Turenne at the Siege of Arras. Lord Hatton reported seeing him in Paris that year, speaking in abusive terms of Charles II, and preparing to carry a message from the Duke of Buckingham to Cromwell. Thereafter, he disappeared from public life until the Restoration.

== Cavalier Parliament ==
He was commissioned a cornet in the King's troop, Royal Regiment of Horse Guards in 1661. He may have unsuccessfully contested Stamford that year; his father, a royalist, joined with interest of the Hatcher family, Presbyterians, to oppose the borough's principal patron, the Earl of Exeter, but in the event it was Exeter's candidates, William Stafford and William Montagu that were returned. The election was appealed on petition, but the election committee resolved that the franchise in Stamford was limited to freemen paying scot and lot only, and the election of Stafford and Montagu was upheld. After Stafford died in 1665, Bertie was returned at the ensuing by-election.

Bertie was not a particularly active member, though certain invocations of parliamentary privilege by him suggest he was solicitous for the honour of the office. He first sat in the fifth session of the Cavalier Parliament, held at Oxford. On the day of his introduction to Parliament, he and his elder brother Lord Willoughby followed their brother-in-law Sir Thomas Osborne in voting against Lord Clarendon's measure for imposing an oath of nonresistance on the whole kingdom, which was thus unexpectedly defeated. Later in the session, he sat on the committee for the act of attainder against Joseph Bampfield and other English republicans in Dutch service. On 14 September 1667, he was made a lieutenant in Lord Hawley's troop of the Horse Guards. During the same year, he was appointed to the commissions of assessment for Westminster and Lincolnshire.

Bertie continued to be identified with the court party (the future Tories) for the duration of the Cavalier Parliament. He was named to committees involved with the suppression of Catholicism and Nonconformism, but most of his Parliamentary activity in the early 1670s was related to the Bertie family's interests, or local affairs in Lincolnshire. In 1671, he was appointed to the commission on accounts for the loyal and indigent officers fund. In this role, he and John Grobham Howe were sent to Sir Edward Turnour, the Chief Baron of the Exchequer, in January 1673/4 to request that he speed the passage of Sir John Bennet's accounts for the fund at the Exchequer. In early February, he participated in the debate on the conduct Duke of Buckingham, suggesting that the Commons hear Sir Thomas Williams, who had reported Buckingham's condemnation of the King, before seeking concurrence from the House of Lords in their resolution condemning Buckingham.

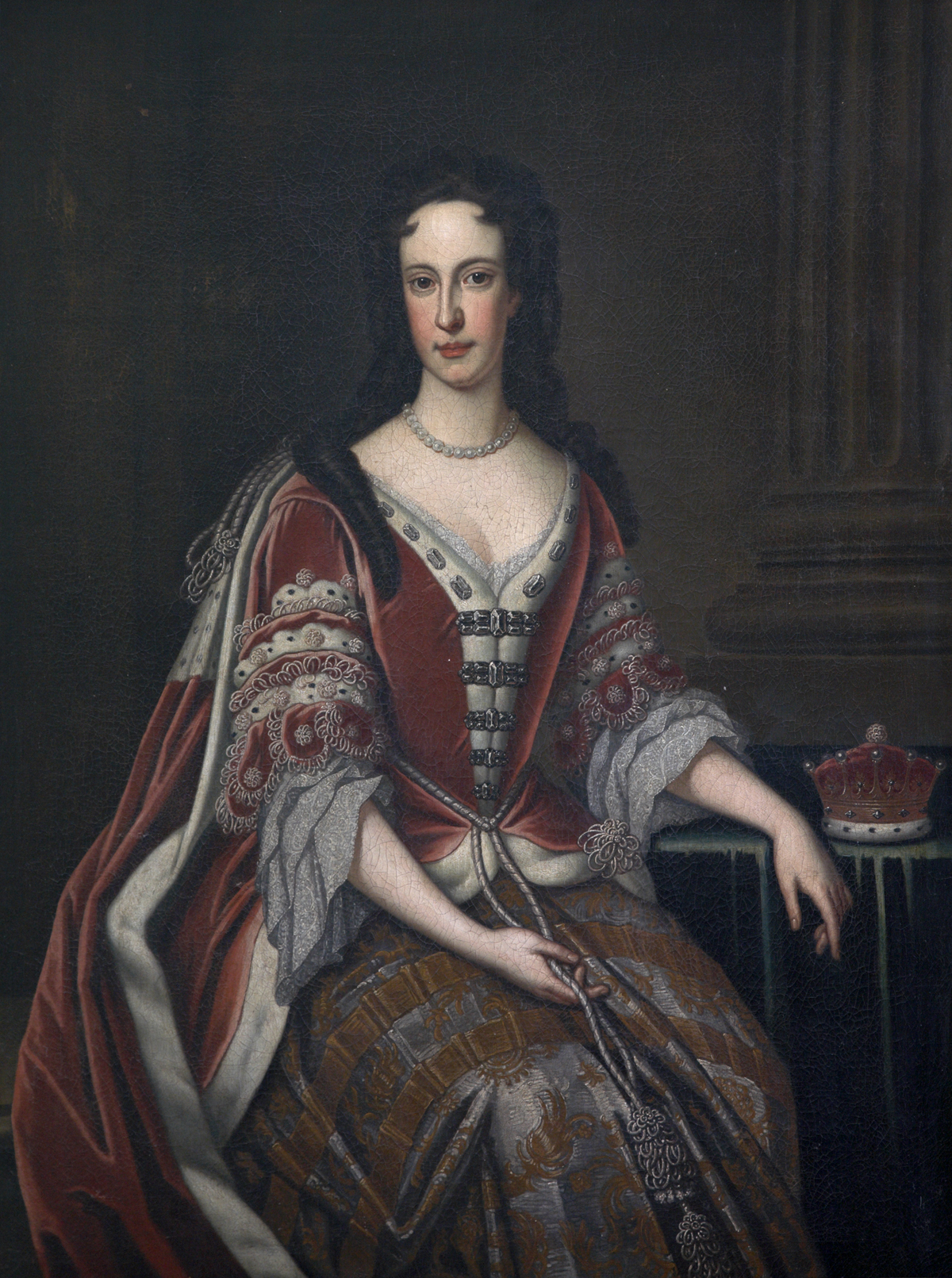
Peregrine's daughter Bridget (pictured) later became Countess Poulett by marriage.

Soon after, Bertie married Susan Monins, daughter of Sir Edward Monins, 2nd Baronet, by whom he had three daughters:

- Bridget Bertie (d. 23 March 1748), married on 14 April 1702 John Poulett, 1st Earl Poulett;
- Elizabeth Bertie (b. 6 December 1675), died unmarried;
- Mary Bertie, married first Anthony Henley, second Henry Bertie (d. 1735), her half-first cousin.

He was removed from the Westminster commission of assessment in 1674, and was made a commissioner of the Alienation Office in August 1675, replacing Alexander Halsall. During that year, he was the teller against the adjournment of debate on the King's Speech. (Note: Watson gives a date of 13 April 1675, but there does not appear to have been a debate on the King's Speech opening that session of Parliament. 13 October 1675, when the debate on the King's Speech was adjourned, allowing a trial of strength between court and country parties, seems more plausible.) He was also appointed to the committee to prevent Roman Catholics from sitting in the Lords and Commons. On 15 July 1676, after the death of Sir Francis Wyndham, Bertie succeeded him as captain of a Horse Guards troop. From Osborne, now Lord Danby and Lord High Treasurer, he continued to receive patronage; in July 1676, Danby appointed him a searcher of customs in London upon the death of George Peake, and from 1677 to 1678, he was the receiver of ship tax in Kent. Not surprisingly, given his official appointments, Bertie was identified by his contemporaries with the court party. In 1678, his younger brother Charles was also returned for Stamford at a by-election.

Bertie naturally opposed the proceedings against Danby that began in December 1678, but was nonetheless appointed to the committee to consider Danby's impeachment. In the general election of March 1679, Sir Richard Cust, formerly an ally of the Berties, and William Hyde obtained the support of the new Lord Exeter at Stamford. The Exclusion Crisis had weakened the Berties' position; the Stamford electors were now indifferent to the sensibilities of the Court, and Exeter's electoral interest was strong enough that both Charles and Peregrine withdrew from the contest without a poll. Peregrine's Horse Guards troop escorted the commissioners appointed by the new Parliament to disband the standing army through East Anglia in June 1679. Later that month, he resigned his commission and was replaced by Thomas Lucy. The death of his brother-in-law Sir Thomas Monins, 3rd Baronet in 1678 had left his wife co-heiress of the estate of Waldershare. She eventually became the sole possessor, and Bertie was to make his residence there for the rest of his life. In 1680, he was removed as a commissioner of assessment in Lincolnshire and appointed a justice of the peace in the Parts of Holland and Lindsey, and he became a member of the Honourable Artillery Company in 1682. He exchanged his post as a deputy searcher of customs for that of a surveyor of landwaiters in 1683, replacing the late Samuel Cust; he was succeeded by Edward Le Neve. By 1686, he had become surveyor of the searchers instead.

== Under James II ==
The borough of Stamford was re-chartered in February 1685 to place it firmly under court influence. Lord Exeter was ousted as recorder in favor of Peregrine's eldest brother, Lord Lindsey, and Peregrine and Charles were named aldermen of Stamford. Peregrine was also appointed an alderman of Boston, and was a member of both corporations until October 1688. Both brothers were returned as members for Stamford in the Loyal Parliament, probably without a contest. Peregrine served on six committees in that Parliament, and was made a freeman and bailiff of Oxford in 1687. The Berties, like many Tories, were attached to the Church of England, and forced into opposition by the religious policies of James II. After the dissolution of Parliament, Lindsey suggested that the corporation would return Charles and William Hyde, the latter's candidacy conciliating Lord Exeter's interest. Lindsey attempted to find a place for Peregrine at Grantham on the interest of the Earl of Rutland, who had married their niece Catherine Noel and was recorder of the town. However, it was the sitting MP and alderman, Thomas Harrington, who in fact dominated the Grantham corporation and rejected Peregrine's candidature.

== After the Revolution ==
After the Glorious Revolution, Peregrine was returned to the Convention Parliament for Westbury on the interest of his half-brother, the Earl of Abingdon. He was one of the minority of the House of Commons who concurred with the Lords that the flight of James II had not vacated the throne; otherwise, he showed little activity in this Parliament. He did propose a motion to except Sir William Williams from the act of indemnity, but the Commons narrowly voted not to except individuals from the act by name. Danby proposed Bertie as envoy to Holland, but William III rejected him as unfit for the post.

Bertie was again returned for Westbury in the 1690 election without a contest. A Tory like the rest of his family, his role in this Parliament was overshadowed by his kinsmen, including his more active nephew and namesake, Peregrine Bertie. The disaffection of Danby, now Marquess of Carmarthen, with the other Tory peers seems to have drawn the Berties, to some extent, into opposition to the Court during this time. By 1694, however, Peregrine was writing to Lindsey to suggest that Charles might take the occasion of a by-election at Stamford to put himself in better standing with the Court. In 1693, he gave up his customs surveyorship and was replaced by John Dove.

Bertie stood down at the 1695 election and was replaced by his nephew Robert. He died in 1701 and was buried at All Saints Church, Waldershare with his wife, who predeceased him in 1697. His will suggests that he was well-to-do when he died (Bridget and Mary each received dowries of £10,000), and on good terms with his brother-in-law Carmarthen, now Duke of Leeds.

== Notes ==
Parliament of England
Preceded by William Stafford; William Montagu	Member of Parliament for Stamford; 1665–1679; With: William Montagu 1665–1677; Henry Noel 1677; Charles Bertie 1678–1679	Succeeded by Sir Richard Cust, Bt; William Hyde
Preceded by Sir Richard Cust, Bt; William Hyde	Member of Parliament for Stamford; 1685–1687; With: Charles Bertie	Succeeded by Charles Bertie; William Hyde
Preceded by Richard Lewis; James Herbert	Member of Parliament for Westbury; 1689–1695; With: Richard Lewis	Succeeded by Richard Lewis; Robert Bertie
