= Henry Bertie (MP for Beaumaris) =

English politician (1675–1735)

Henry Bertie (4 May 1675 – 18 December 1735) was an English politician and Lords Proprietor of Carolina who sat in the House of Commons from 1705 to 1727.

== Biography ==
Bertie was the third son of James Bertie, 1st Earl of Abingdon and his wife Eleanora Lee, the daughter and heiress of Sir Henry Lee, 3rd Baronet, of Quarrendon, Buckinghamshire.

Bertie was one of the Lords Proprietors of Carolina, heir of the proprietorship granted to Sir William Berkeley. At the 1705 general election, he was returned unopposed as Member of Parliament for Beaumaris, a pocket borough in Wales. He won a contest at Beamaris in the 1708 general election and was returned unopposed in 1710, 1713 and 1715. He won another contest in 1722 but was defeated at the 1727 general election by Watkin Williams-Wynn.

Bertie died at Boulogne on 18 December 1735.

== Family ==
Bertie first married Arabella Susanna Hamilton, daughter of Hugh Hamilton, 1st Viscount of Glenawly, on 17 July 1708, but she died on 10 December 1708. He later married his half-first cousin Mary Bertie, daughter of Peregrine Bertie of Waldershare and granddaughter of Montagu Bertie, 2nd Earl of Lindsey. By her he had one daughter, Susanna Bertie, who married her cousin Charles Bertie, rector of St. Mary le Strand, son of Charles Bertie.

Parliament of England
Preceded by Coningsby Williams	Member of Parliament for Beaumaris; 1705–1707	Succeeded by Parliament of Great Britain
Parliament of Great Britain
Preceded by Parliament of England	Member of Parliament for Beaumaris; 1707–1727	Succeeded by Watkin Williams-Wynn
