= Montagu Venables-Bertie, 2nd Earl of Abingdon =

English nobleman

Montagu Venables-Bertie, 2nd Earl of Abingdon PC (4 February 1673 – 16 June 1743), styled Hon. Montagu Bertie until 1682 and Lord Norreys from 1682 to 1699, was an English nobleman.

== Career ==
Montagu was the eldest son of James Bertie, 1st Earl of Abingdon and Eleanora Lee. Though young and not yet matriculated, he was chosen captain of the company of militia foot raised from Christ Church during the Monmouth Rebellion. Through the influence of his father, he was made a freeman and common councilman of Woodstock in 1686, and a freeman of Oxford in 1687. On 22 September 1687, he married Anne (d. 28 April 1715), the daughter and coheiress of Peter Venables (d. 1679), baron of Kinderton. (Note: The barony of Kinderton was not a peerage, but a feudal barony of the county palatine of Chester.) He shortly afterwards assumed the additional surname of Venables. At the January 1689 election, he was returned, though underage, as a knight of the shire for Berkshire on his father's interest. During the year, he was made a bailiff of Oxford and appointed a deputy lieutenant of Oxfordshire, holding that office until 1701.

Despite his age, he appears several times in the records of the Convention Parliament. Like the bulk of his family, he was a Tory, and voted to agree with the Lords that the throne was not vacant after the flight of James II. A member of several committees, he spoke briefly in May on the quarrel between his uncle Henry Bertie and Sir William Harbord.

Norreys stood for Berkshire again in the 1690 election, but the field was far more crowded; Lord Lovelace agitated on behalf of a Whig candidate, Richard Neville, and Abingdon put Norreys in on his interest for Oxfordshire as well. With two other Tories, Sir Henry Winchcombe and Sir Humphrey Forster, in the field, Norreys may have given up campaigning in Berkshire before the poll. An acrimonious campaign in Oxfordshire led to accusations of Jacobitism against Norreys and his father, but he and Sir Robert Jenkinson triumphed by a substantial margin over their Whig opponents, Sir John Cope and Thomas Wheate.

He was Member of Parliament for Oxfordshire 1690–1699 and Colonel of the foot regiment of the Oxfordshire Militia in 1697. He was Constable of the Tower and Lord Lieutenant of the Tower Hamlets between 1702 and 1705. He held the office of Lord Lieutenant of Oxfordshire between 1702 and 1705. After the 1705 English general election, the entrance of the Whigs into government meant that he was deprived of his offices in October 1705. He was Chief Justice in Eyre, south of the Trent, 1711–1715. He held the office of Lord Lieutenant of Oxfordshire again between 1712 and 1715. On the death of Queen Anne in 1714 he was appointed a Lord Justice of the Realm.

Abingdon bought the manor of Godstow from Sir John Walter, 3rd Baronet in 1702, but sold it off in 1710 to John Churchill, 1st Duke of Marlborough, who also bought the adjoining manor of Wolvercote from Walter. In 1703–1704, Abingdon purchased the manor of Littleton Auncells from George Bowditch and James Townsend, which he added to his adjoining estate at West Lavington, Wiltshire. Sometime before 1738, he sold the manor of Bradenstoke, Wiltshire to Germanicus Sheppard.

== Family ==
He married firstly, Anne Venables, daughter of Peter Venables, Baron of Kinderton and Catharine Shirley, on 22 September 1687. She was a Lady of the Bedchamber to Queen Anne from 12 May 1702 to November 1705, when she resigned, and again from January 1712 until Queen Anne's death in 1714. Anne died on 28 April 1715 and was buried at Rycote.

He married secondly, Mary Gould, daughter of James Gould and Mary Bonde and the widow of Charles Churchill, on 13 February 1716/7 at Beaconsfield, and had issue:

- James Bertie, Lord Norreys (14 November 1717 – 25 February 1717/8), died of smallpox

Mary, Dowager Countess of Abingdon, was buried at St Peter's Church, Dorchester on 7 January 1757.

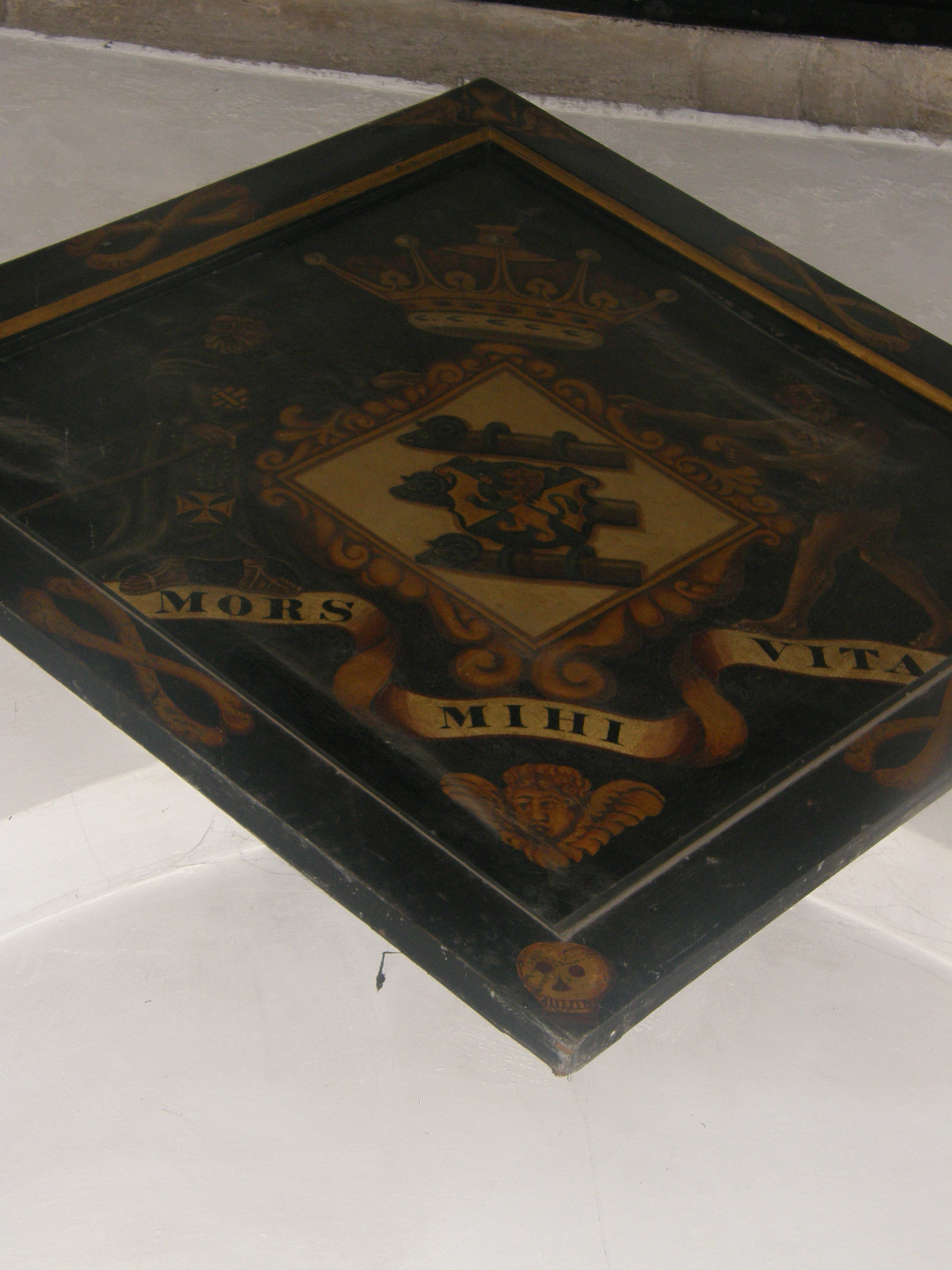
The funeral hatchment of Mary, Dowager Countess of Abingdon, in St. Peter's Church, Dorchester, Dorset, England.On a lozenge, the arms of Bertie, "Argent, three battering rams fesswise in pale proper, headed and banded azure," with an escutcheon of pretence showing the arms of Gould, "Per saltire or and azure, a lion rampant counterchanged." Supporters: Dexter: a grey friar holding in his right hand a staff and rosary, Sinister: a wild man. Each supporter charged on the breast with a fret Or.Above all, an earl's coronet.

Abingdon died on 16 June 1743 and was buried on 27 June at Rycote. He was succeeded by his nephew Willoughby Bertie, 3rd Earl of Abingdon.

== Notes ==
Parliament of England
Preceded by Richard Southby; Sir Humphrey Forster, Bt	Member of Parliament for Berkshire; 1689–1690; With: Sir Henry Winchcombe, Bt	Succeeded by Sir Henry Winchcombe, Bt; Sir Humphrey Forster, Bt
Preceded by Sir Robert Jenkinson, Bt; Sir John Cope, Bt	Member of Parliament for Oxfordshire; 1690–1699; With: Sir Robert Jenkinson, Bt	Succeeded by Sir Robert Jenkinson, Bt; Sir Robert Dashwood, Bt
Legal offices
Preceded by The Earl of Wharton	Justice in Eyre; South of the Trent; 1711–1715	Succeeded by The Earl of Tankerville
Honorary titles
Preceded by The Duke of Norfolk	Lord Lieutenant of Berkshire; 1701–1702	Succeeded by The Lord Craven
Preceded by The Lord Lucas	Constable of the Tower; Lord Lieutenant of the Tower Hamlets; 1702–1705	Succeeded by The Earl of Essex
Preceded by The Lord Wharton	Lord Lieutenant of Oxfordshire; 1702–1706	Succeeded by The Duke of Marlborough
Preceded by The Duke of Marlborough	Lord Lieutenant of Oxfordshire; 1712–1715	Succeeded by The Earl of Godolphin
Peerage of England
Preceded by James Bertie	Earl of Abingdon; 1699–1743	Succeeded by Willoughby Bertie
