= Edward Norton (conspirator) =

Edward Norton (baptised 1654 – 1702) was an English soldier and politician, an early Whig supporter and conspirator of the Rye House Plot.

== Life ==
His sister Ellen married the Westbury Member of Parliament William Trenchard. With Trenchard's support, Norton was himself elected MP for Westbury in the second 1679 general election, though it required an election petition to unseat Henry Bertie and Richard Lewis who had been declared the winners.

With others of the Whig faction, he was the target of a government attempt towards the end of 1681 to discredit opponents by establishing subornation of perjury. He appeared before the Privy Council, to answer charges laid by Robert Bolron, and Lawrence Mowbray.

Norton attended meetings of the Rye House Cabal around Robert West in December 1682, in which an assassination plot and a general armed uprising were discussed. When the plot was discovered he escaped to Holland.

In later life he supported the Glorious Revolution, and served in the army in the following decade.
