= Robert Bertie (of Benham) =

Robert Bertie (28 February 1677 – 8 August 1710) was a British Member of Parliament for Westbury, a younger son of James Bertie, 1st Earl of Abingdon. He entered Parliament through family influence at the age of 19 in 1695 and was subsequently called to the bar. He took an interest in the textile industry that animated his borough, and was returned continuously through 1708 except for one electoral defeat in 1702 that was reversed on petition. He married soon after standing down from Parliament and died the following year, without children.

== Early life and education ==
Bertie was born on 28 February 1677, the fourth son of James Bertie, 5th Baron Norreys (created Earl of Abingdon in 1682) by his first wife. He matriculated at New College, Oxford in 1693, where he studied until 1696. He was admitted to the Middle Temple that year and called to the bar in 1700.

== Political career ==
The influence of his father secured him a seat in Parliament at the young age of 19: he was returned for Westbury in the 1695 election. (As lord of the manor of Westbury, Abingdon had a powerful electoral interest in the borough.) He brought in a bill in the interests of Oxford University during his first session. A Tory like his father, Bertie refused to sign the Association of 1696 and opposed the attainder of Sir John Fenwick. Westbury was a center of woollen manufacture, and Bertie sponsored a bill to promote the trade. A paper he drew up in support of his brother and fellow MP James Bertie included an attack on Lord Chancellor Somers. It nearly provoked a dispute between the Lords and Commons, but the matter was smoothed over when Abingdon apologized to Somers and the Lords, and the paper was burned by the common hangman.

He was re-elected in the 1698 election and classified by contemporaries as a Country supporter. He may have continued his support for the English textile industry. Bertie was made a freeman and bailiff of Oxford in 1699. In 1700, he was identified with the interest of his half-uncle, Thomas Osborne, 1st Duke of Leeds. He was returned uncontested in the January 1701 election and the subsequent November 1701 election; the retirement of his fellow MP Richard Lewis allowed his uncle Henry Bertie to claim the other seat at Westbury. During this year he was also appointed recorder of Hertford. However, the Bertie interest at Westbury was almost immediately attacked by the Whigs, perhaps taking advantage of the distressed state of the textile industry occasioned by the War of the Spanish Succession. The London merchant Thomas Phipps captured the loyalty of some of the officers of the borough, aided by William Trenchard, a former MP who had triumphed over Henry Bertie on petition in 1680. Phipps and Trenchard defeated the Berties in the 1702 election, and an election petition by the Berties followed. After charges and counter-charges of bribery, the House of Commons, in a perhaps partisan judgment, declared the Berties duly elected.

Bertie was made a freeman of Hertford in 1703, and was appointed counsel for the duchy of Lancaster and steward for the duchy in Oxfordshire and Berkshire. He joined the Tackers in 1704, and unsuccessfully backed the High Tory William Bromley for the Speakership in the 2nd Parliament of Queen Anne. In February 1708, he obtained a leave of absence from Parliament, and declined to stand for Westbury in the 1708 election, perhaps due to family affairs.

== Marriage and death ==
In early 1709, he married Catherine, the daughter of Richard Wenman, 4th Viscount Wenman. Bertie died of "a dead palsy" on 8 August 1710, leaving no children. He left his estate to his wife, whom he declared to have been "so extraordinary kind and civil to me".

Parliament of England
Preceded by Richard Lewis; Peregrine Bertie	Member of Parliament for Westbury; 1695–1702; With: Richard Lewis 1695–1701; Henry Bertie 1701–1702	Succeeded by Thomas Phipps; William Trenchard
Preceded by Thomas Phipps; William Trenchard	Member of Parliament for Westbury; 1702–1707; With: Henry Bertie	Succeeded by Parliament of Great Britain
Parliament of Great Britain
Preceded by Parliament of England	Member of Parliament for Westbury; 1707–1708; With: Henry Bertie	Succeeded by Henry Bertie; Francis Annesley
