= Vere Bertie =

English barrister and judge

Vere Bertie (died 1680) was an English barrister and judge.

== Life and career ==
He was of a Cavalier family, the fourth son to Montagu Bertie, 2nd Earl of Lindsey, Lord Great Chamberlain to Charles I, and his first wife Martha, daughter of Sir William Cockayn of Rushton, Northamptonshire, and widow of John Ramsay, 1st Earl of Holderness. He entered the Middle Temple 29 January 1655, was called to the bar 10 June 1659, and became a master of the bench of his inn in January 1674. Before 1665 he had obtained the degree of serjeant-at-law; that year, with his brother Charles, he was made an honorary M.A. at Oxford on the occasion of the visit of Edward Montagu, 2nd Earl of Manchester

Bertie's legal career was helped by the Earl of Danby, his brother-in-law. On 4 June 1675 he was made a baron of the exchequer, and was transferred to the court of common pleas 15 June 1678.

== Dismissal ==
On the fall of the First Danby ministry, King Charles II formed a new council of thirty (the Privy Council Ministry, with Lord Shaftesbury as Lord President, Bertie was discharged from his office of judge on 29 April 1679. With him were discharged also Sir William Wilde, Sir Edward Thurland, and Sir Francis Bramston.

This move came at the height of the Popish Plot allegations, and Bertie, along with those judges, had four days previously been among those who tried Nathaniel Reading in the court of king's bench at Westminster. Reading was indicted on the evidence of the perjured informer William Bedloe for stifling king's evidence against the Catholic Lords in the Tower of London. None of these judges concurred in the sentence—a £1,000 fine, one year's imprisonment, and one hour in the pillory—pronounced by the other judges, who were Sir Francis North, William Montagu, Sir Robert Atkins, Sir Thomas Jones, and Sir William Dolben.

== Death ==
Bertie died unmarried 23 February 1681, and was buried in the Temple Church. The contemporary law reports contain no reports of his decisions.

== Notes ==
Attribution

This article incorporates text from a publication now in the public domain: Stephen, Leslie, ed. (1885). "Bertie, Vere". Dictionary of National Biography. Vol. 4. London: Smith, Elder & Co.
