= Montagu Bertie, 2nd Earl of Lindsey =

English soldier, courtier, and politician

Montagu Bertie
- Earl of Lindsey
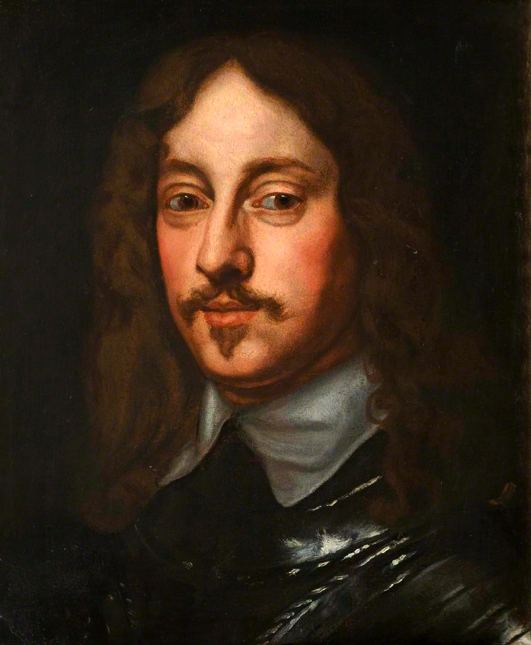
- The Earl of Lindsey.
- Born: 1608; Grimsthorpe, Lincolnshire, England
- Died: 25 July 1666 (aged 57–58); Campden House, Kensington, London, England
- Buried: Grimsthorpe
- Noble family: Bertie
- Spouses: Martha Ramsay (née Cockayne), Dowager Countess of Holderness; Bridget Wray
- Issue: Robert Bertie, 3rd Earl of Lindsey; Hon. Peregrine Bertie; Hon. Richard Bertie; Hon. Vere Bertie; Hon. Charles Bertie; Elizabeth, Viscountess Campden; Bridget, Duchess of Leeds; Lady Catherine Dormer
- Father: Robert Bertie, 1st Earl of Lindsey
- Mother: Elizabeth Montagu

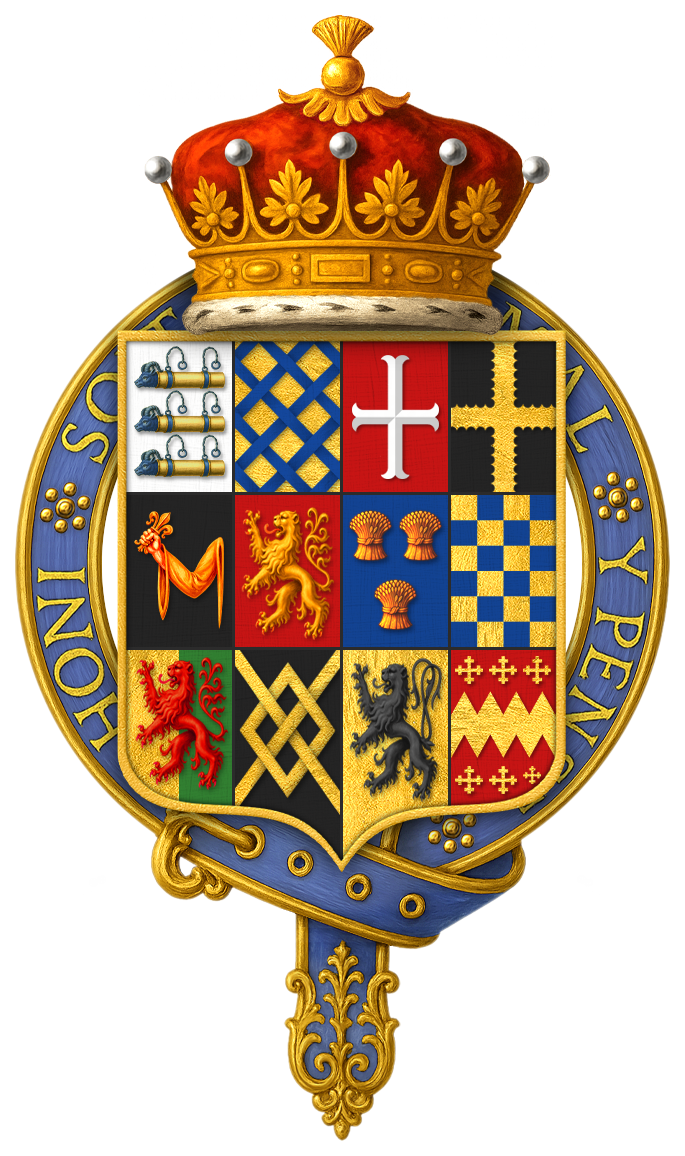
Quartered arms of Montagu Bertie, 2nd Earl of Lindsey, KG

Montagu Bertie, 2nd Earl of Lindsey, KG, PC (1608 – 25 July 1666), was an English soldier, courtier, and politician who sat in the House of Commons between 1624 and 1626. He was created Baron Willoughby de Eresby by writ of acceleration in 1640 and inherited the peerage of Earl of Lindsey in 1642. He fought in the Royalist army in the English Civil War.

== Early life ==
Bertie was born in Grimsthorpe Castle, Grimsthorpe, the eldest son of Robert Bertie, 1st Earl of Lindsey, and his wife Elizabeth Montagu, daughter of Edward Montagu, 1st Baron Montagu of Boughton. After a brief term at Sidney Sussex College, Cambridge, in 1623, Bertie then served as Member of Parliament for Lincolnshire in 1624 and Stamford from 1625 to 1626, when, upon his father's elevation to an earldom, he assumed the style of Lord Willoughby de Eresby.

At some point during his early life, he was also Captain of a cavalry troop in the Low Countries. He rose in favour with King Charles I and was appointed a Gentleman of the Privy Chamber, High Steward of Boston, and Steward, Warden and Chief Ranger of Waltham Forest in 1634.

In 1639, Willoughby raised The King's Life Guard of Foot, composed of four companies, for service in the First Bishops' War and was given a Captaincy in the regiment. The following year, he was appointed High Steward of the Honour of Bolingbroke and the Manor of Sutton. When the Long Parliament was convened on 3 November 1640, he was summoned to the House of Lords by a writ of acceleration as Baron Willoughby de Eresby.

In October 1641, Lord Willoughby and four companions, including Endymion Porter, visited Scotland. Their sight-seeing was recorded in an anonymous poem, A Scottish Journie.

== English Civil War ==
Both Lord Willoughby and his father supported the King and raised a regiment of cavalry in Lincolnshire on his behalf. Lord Willoughby commanded the Life Guards at Edgehill, where his father was mortally wounded by a shot through the thigh. Willoughby surrendered to the Parliamentarians in order to attend his father, whom he now succeeded as Earl of Lindsey and Lord Great Chamberlain. He was imprisoned in Warwick Castle, where he wrote a defiant declaration and justification of his loyalty to the King. He was not released until a prisoner exchange in July 1643, whereupon he rejoined the King at Oxford and was appointed a Privy Counsellor in December. As colonel of the King's Life Guards of Foot and subsequently lieutenant-general of the Life Guards "and all the foot", he fought at the First Battle of Newbury, Cropredy Bridge, Lostwithiel, Second Battle of Newbury, and was wounded at Naseby. In addition to his military services for the King, Lindsey frequently acted as a commissioner to treat with Parliament and persistently urged reconciliation. The King additionally honored Lindsey with the post of Gentleman of the Bedchamber from 1643 until 1649, and Steward, Keeper and Ranger of Woodstock in 1644.

Lindsey was present at the surrender of Oxford in June 1646, attended the King in 1647, and finally served as a commissioner for the Treaty of Newport in 1648. He continued to attend the King during his trial and accompanied the King's body to its burial at Windsor. Lindsey paid heavily for his allegiance, compounding for his estates in December 1646 at £4360 (later reduced to £2100), a sum he did not pay off until 1651.

== Commonwealth and Restoration ==
After the execution of the King, Lindsey retired into private life, and although his movements were carefully monitored by the Council of State, particularly during the Penruddock uprising and Booth's rebellion, he apparently took no part in the Royalist movement.

After the Restoration, Lindsey was re-appointed to the Privy Council, admitted as Lord Great Chamberlain, and appointed Lord Lieutenant of Lincolnshire. He was made a Knight of the Garter on 1 April 1661 and officiated as Lord Great Chamberlain at the coronation of Charles II on 23 April 1661. In 1662, the office of Earl Marshal was placed in commission and he was named one of the commissioners. Lindsey died in 1666 at Campden House, Kensington, the home of his son-in-law, and was buried at Grimsthorpe.

== Family ==
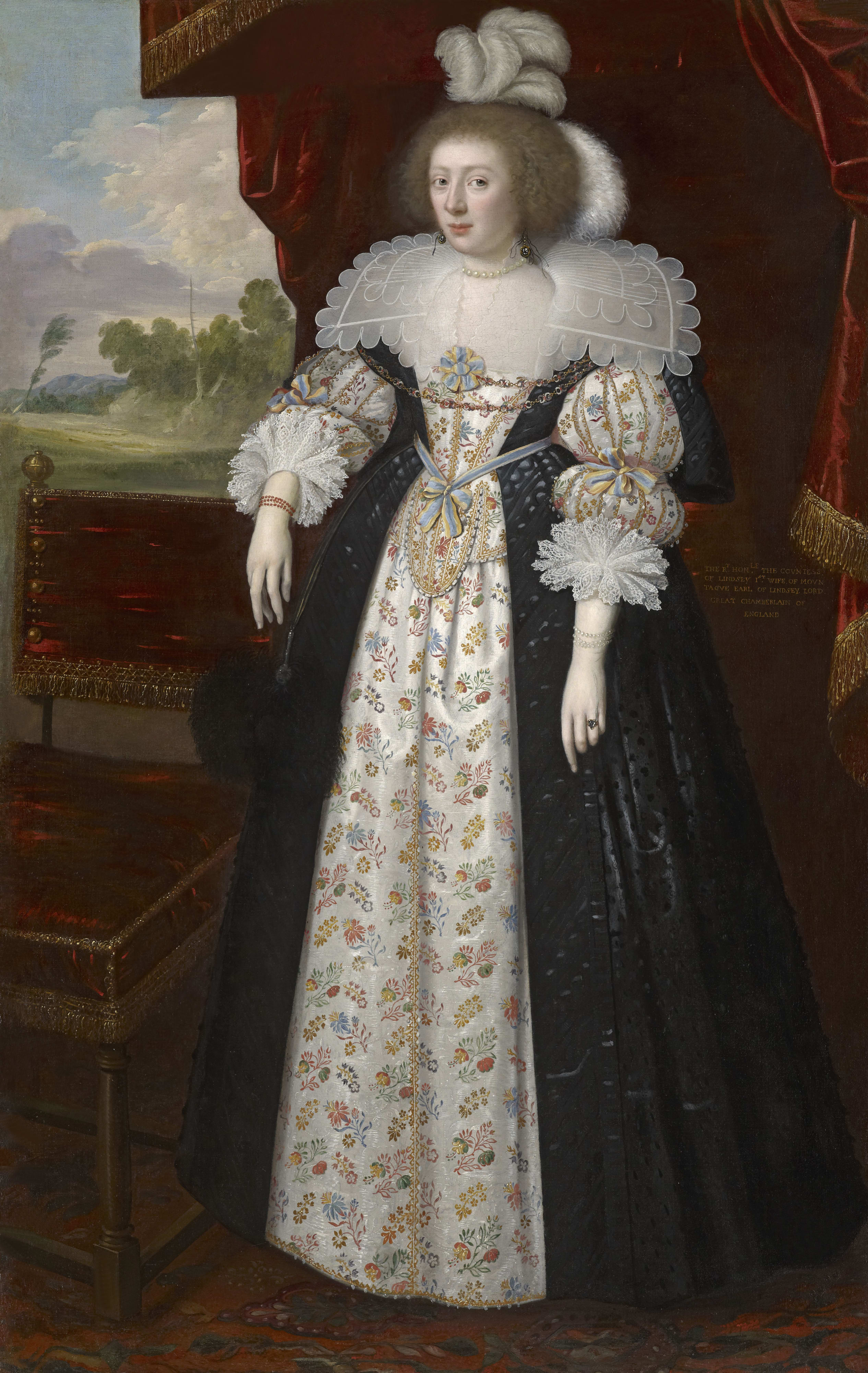
Martha Cockayne, portrait by George Geldorp

Bertie married firstly, on 18 April 1627, Martha Ramsay (née Cockayne), Dowager Countess of Holderness and daughter of Sir William Cockayne, at the Church of St Peter-le-Poor in the City of London. They had eight children:

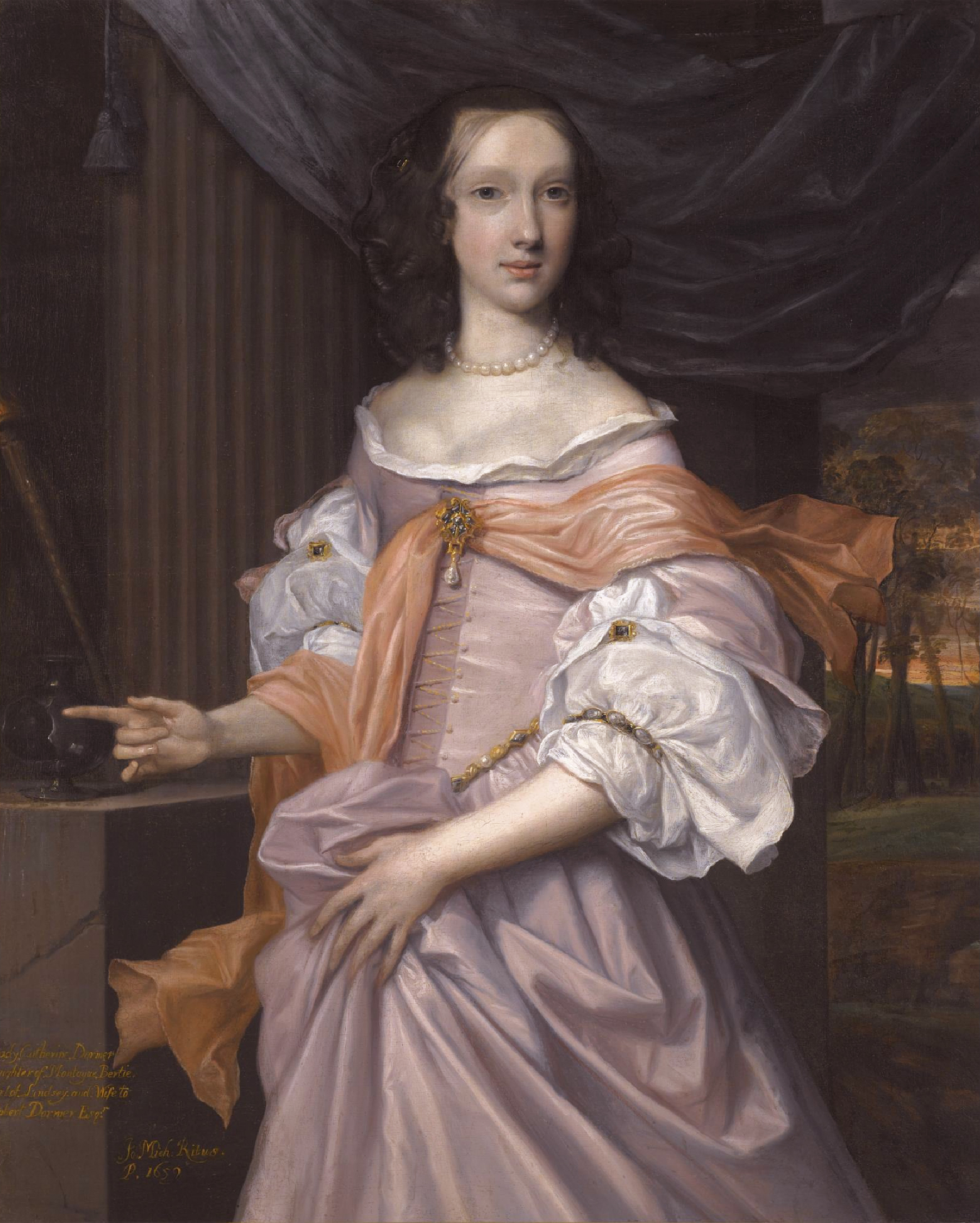
Catherine Dormer (d. 1659) (John Michael Wright, 1659)

- Robert Bertie, 3rd Earl of Lindsey (1630–1701)
- Hon. Peregrine Bertie (ca. 1634–1701)
- Hon. Richard Bertie (ca. 1635 – 19 January 1685/6)
- Hon. Vere Bertie (d. 13 February 1680)
- Hon. Charles Bertie (ca. 1640–1711)
- Lady Elizabeth Bertie (d. 1683), married the 3rd Viscount Campden and had issue
- Lady Bridget Bertie (1629 – 7 January 1704), married the 1st Duke of Leeds and had issue
- Lady Catherine Bertie, married Robert Dormer

Martha died in July 1641, and Bertie married secondly, sometime between 1646 and 1653, Bridget Wray, Baroness Norris, daughter of Edward Wray and Elizabeth Norris. This second marriage produced four children:

- James Bertie, 1st Earl of Abingdon (1653–1699)
- Hon. Edward Bertie
- Hon. Henry Bertie (ca.1656–1734)
- Lady Mary Bertie (1655–1709), married Charles Dormer, 2nd Earl of Carnarvon, no issue

Parliament of England
Preceded by Sir George Manners; Sir Thomas Grantham	Member of Parliament for Lincolnshire; 1624; With: Sir Thomas Grantham	Succeeded by Sir John Wray, 2nd Baronet; Sir Nicholas Sanderson Bt
Preceded by John St Armand; Edward Ayscough	Member of Parliament for Stamford; 1625–1626; With: John St Armand 1625; Brian Palmes 1626	Succeeded by Sir Thomas Hatton, 1st Baronet; Sir Edward Bashe
Political offices
Preceded by The Earl of Lindsey	Lord Great Chamberlain; 1642–1666	Succeeded by The Earl of Lindsey
Honorary titles
Preceded by The Earl of Exeter	Custos Rotulorum of Lincolnshire; 1640–1666	Succeeded by The Earl of Lindsey
English Interregnum	Lord Lieutenant of Lincolnshire; 1660–1666	Succeeded by The Earl of Lindsey
Peerage of England
Preceded by Robert Bertie	Earl of Lindsey; 1642–1666	Succeeded by Robert Bertie
Preceded by Robert Bertie	Baron Willoughby de Eresby (writ of acceleration); 1640–1666	Succeeded by Robert Bertie
