= Charles Bertie (senior) =

British administrator, diplomat, and politician

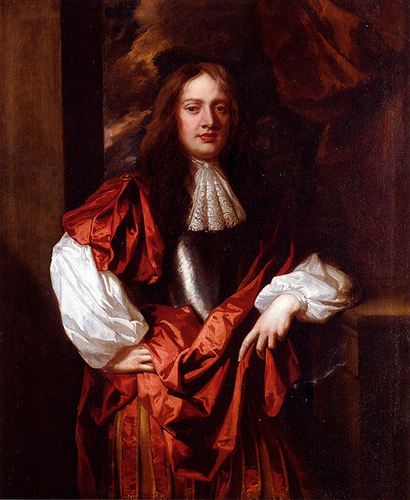
Charles Bertie

Captain Charles Bertie (c. 1640 – 22 March 1711), of Uffington, near Stamford, Lincolnshire, was a British administrator, diplomat, and Tory politician who sat in the English and British House of Commons between 1678 and 1711. He rose to serve as Secretary to the Treasury under his brother-in-law, the Earl of Danby, from 1673 until 1679 but did not wield significant political power thereafter. He did, however, twice enjoy the office of Treasurer of the Ordnance before his death in 1711.

== Early life and travels abroad ==
Bertie was the fifth son of Montagu Bertie, 2nd Earl of Lindsey by his first wife, Martha Cokayne. He was educated first at a school of Charles Croke at Amersham and then probably at Westminster School. Admitted to the Middle Temple on 25 October 1658, he did not, however, take up a career as a barrister but went abroad in France and Switzerland for the next several years.

Determined upon a diplomatic career, Bertie served as attaché at Madrid from 1664 to 1665 under Sir Richard Fanshawe, who wrote favorably of him to the King. He graduated M.A. from the University of Oxford in 1665 and was incorporated at Cambridge University in 1667. He was subsequently commissioned both as a second lieutenant in the Royal Navy and as a captain in the Coldstream Guards in 1668.

Bertie traveled through Scandinavia and possibly Prussia and Poland in 1670, and was named envoy-extraordinary to Denmark in March 1671. He left the following month for Denmark, by way of Hamburg, and returned home in February 1672 after the completion of his negotiations.

== Secretary of the Treasury ==
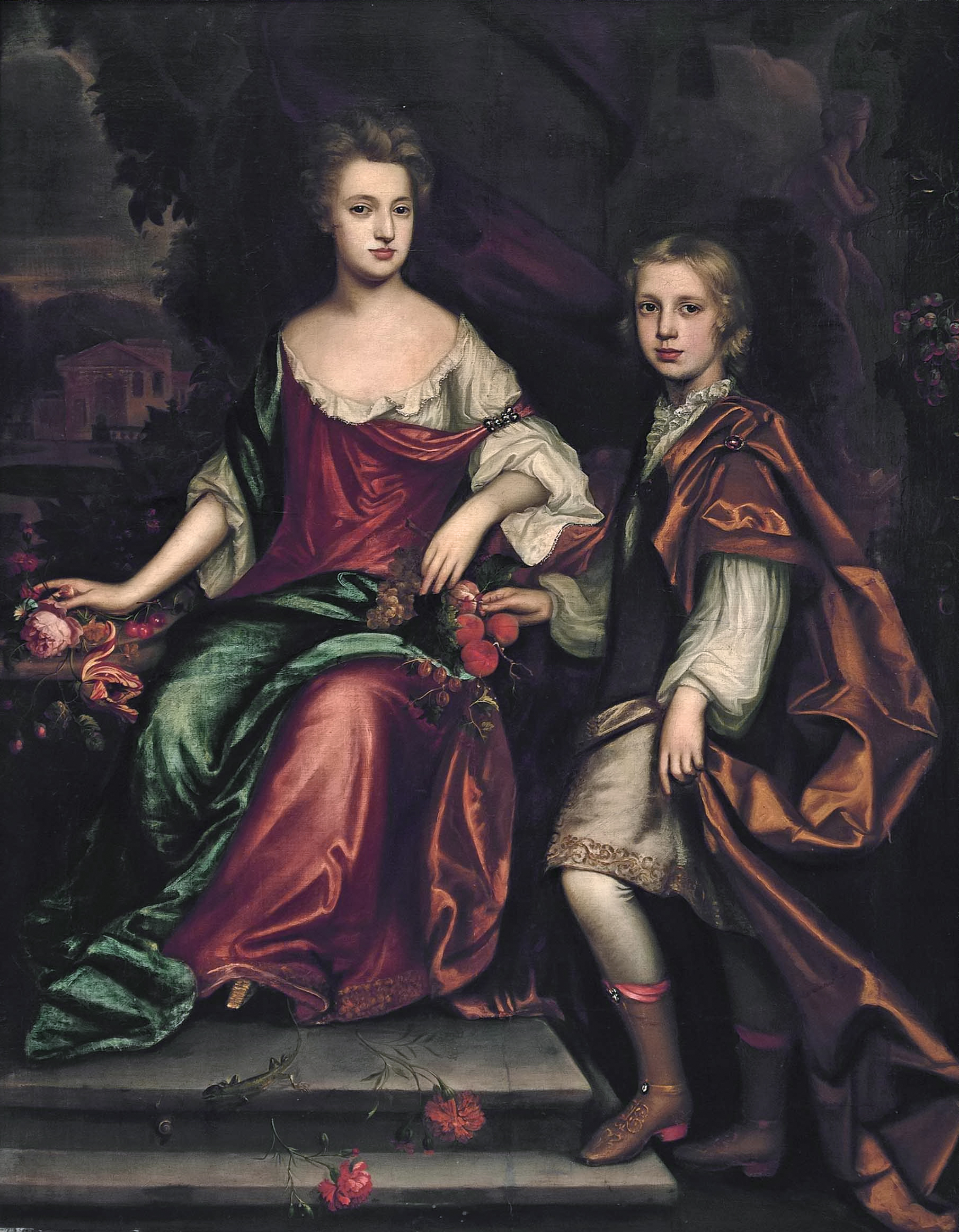
Charles and Elizabeth Bertie, later Lady Fitzwalter (circle of Thomas Murray)

In 1673, Bertie's brother-in-law, the then Viscount Latimer, was appointed Lord High Treasurer, providing Bertie with a new route for advancement. He was appointed Secretary to the Treasury and served as his brother-in-law's administrator there until 1679. He also purchased an estate at Uffington, Lincolnshire in 1673, and in the following year married Mary (d. 13 January 1679), daughter of Peter Tryon and widow of Sir Samuel Jones.

Bertie was eager to secure additional treasury offices and obtained a reversion to the office of Treasurer of the Ordnance in 1675 and the office of Auditor of the Receipt of the Exchequer the following year. He also attempted to enter the House of Commons at a by-election at Grimsby in April 1675 but was defeated. However, in February 1678, he was returned for Stamford in another by-election.

Storm clouds had, however, begun to gather around his brother-in-law and patron, now Earl of Danby. As Lord High Treasurer, Danby, though personally anti-French, had been deeply involved in Charles II's collection of a subsidy from Louis XIV, in exchange for English neutrality. With the rupture of Anglo-French relations in 1678, Louis, through the agency of the disaffected Ralph Montagu, attempted by releasing several of his letters to make Danby the scapegoat for the policy. Bertie opposed Danby's impeachment, but to no avail, and his support for Danby cost him his seat in January 1679. Bertie himself became embroiled in the controversy over the distribution of secret service money, and in May, upon refusing to testify without the King's command, was placed in the custody of the Serjeant-at-Arms of the British House of Commons, where he remained until Parliament was dissolved in July.

== Later career ==
Appointed envoy-extraordinary to Germany in summer 1680, Bertie was thus out of the country when a new Parliament was convened in October. He traveled through many of the German states before being recalled after the dissolution of the Oxford Parliament in March 1681. Returning to England in June, he succeeded that August as Treasurer of the Ordnance. With the accession of James II, Bertie was again returned as Member of Parliament for Stamford. Around this time, he also built a new country house in Uffington and was appointed to local posts in Boston and Stamford.

Bertie kept the favour of James throughout his change of policy and the issue of the Declaration of Indulgence and was a court candidate for the abortive 1688 elections. However, he was in Yorkshire with Danby when the latter was preparing to bring in William of Orange. He went down to London in October to allay James' fears and was considered as a mediator between James and Danby. His connection with Danby allowed him to retain influence after the Glorious Revolution and he continued to hold his seat in Parliament. He supported Danby's proposal to declare the throne vacant and settle it upon Mary.

Although Danby, now Marquess of Carmarthen, had returned to eminence, Bertie was unable to achieve significant political power, being passed over as Secretary to the Treasury in 1691. He held several minor posts, including secretary to the Justice in Eyre south of the Trent from 1693 to 1697, while the office was held by his half-brother James Bertie, 1st Earl of Abingdon. While he signed the Association in 1696, he remained a reliable Tory, opposing the attainder of Sir John Fenwick that year.

With the final fall of Carmarthen, now Duke of Leeds, in 1699, Bertie lost his office as Treasurer of the Ordnance to Harry Mordaunt but regained it in 1702 with the accession of Anne. His support for an Occasional Conformity Bill in 1704 was probably the cause of his dismissal in 1705. Bertie opposed the impeachment of Henry Sacheverell in 1710.

== Death and legacy ==
Bertie suffered from a "bad stomach" for much of 1710, and died on 22 March 1711. He was buried at Uffington where his monument referred to his "unspotted reputation" serving Stamford for over 30 years. He and his wife had two children.

- Charles Bertie (aft. 1674–1730) who replaced him as Member of Parliament for Stamford.
- Elizabeth Bertie (24 July 1675 – 20 December 1730), married on 8 June 1693 Charles Mildmay, 18th Baron FitzWalter.

Parliament of England
Preceded by Hon. Peregrine Bertie; Henry Noel	Member of Parliament for Stamford; 1678–1679; With: Hon. Peregrine Bertie	Succeeded by Sir Richard Cust, Bt; William Hyde
Preceded by Sir Richard Cust, Bt; William Hyde	Member of Parliament for Stamford; 1685–1707; With: Hon. Peregrine Bertie 1685–1689; William Hyde 1689–1694; Hon. Philip Bertie 1694–1698; Hon. William Cecil 1698–1705; Hon. Charles Cecil 1705–1707	Succeeded by Parliament of Great Britain
Parliament of Great Britain
Preceded by Parliament of England	Member of Parliament for Stamford; 1707–1711; With: Hon. Charles Cecil	Succeeded by Hon. Charles Cecil; Charles Bertie
Political offices
Preceded by Hon. Sir Robert Howard	Secretary to the Treasury; 1673–1679	Succeeded by Henry Guy
Preceded by Sir George Wharton, Bt	Treasurer of the Ordnance; 1681–1699	Succeeded by Hon. Harry Mordaunt
Preceded by Hon. Harry Mordaunt	Treasurer of the Ordnance; 1702–1705	Succeeded by Hon. Harry Mordaunt
