= James Bertie, 1st Earl of Abingdon =

English nobleman

The Right Honourable The Earl of Abingdon
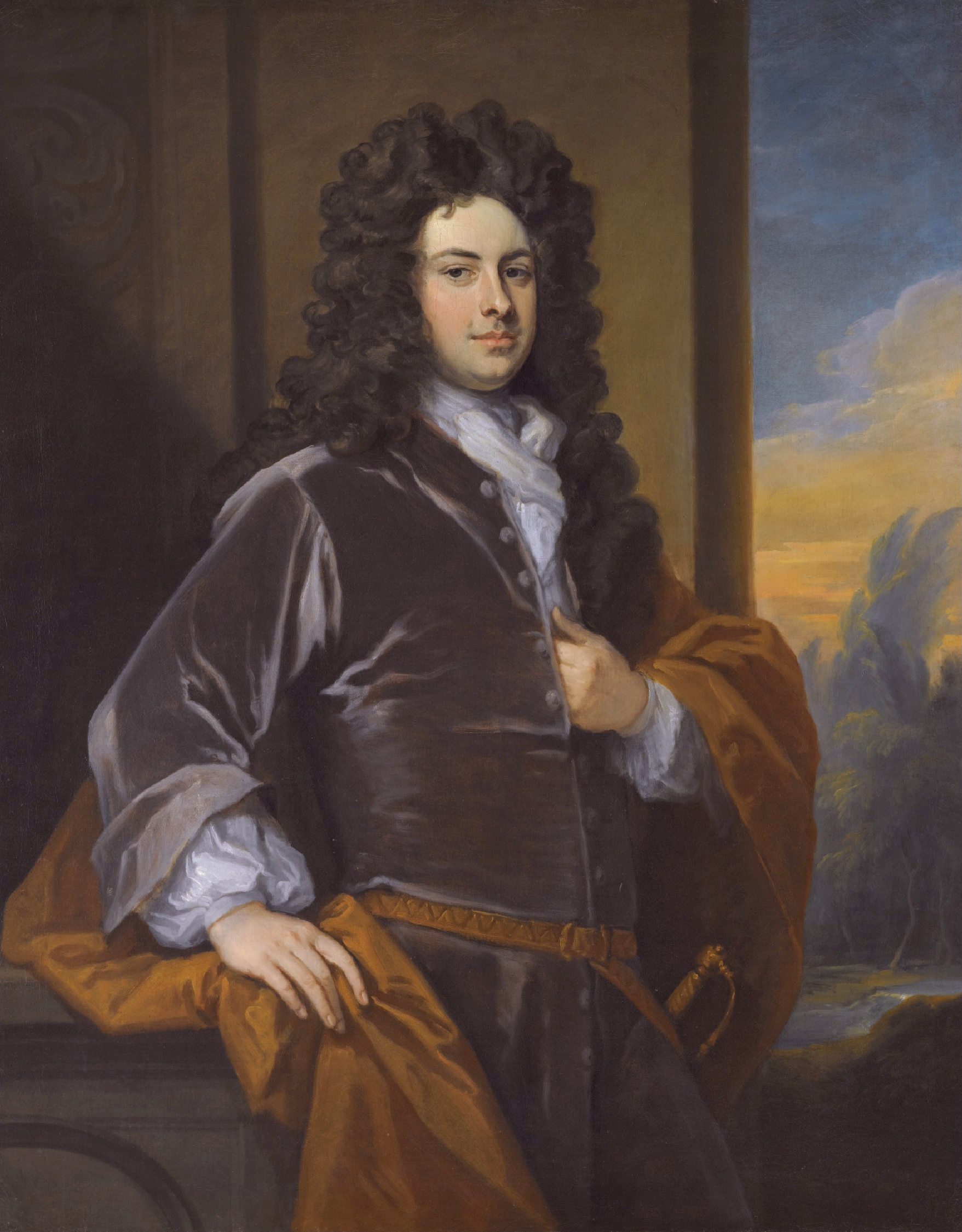

Justice in Eyre South of the Trent
- In office 1693–1697
- Preceded by: The Lord Lovelace
- Succeeded by: The Lord Wharton

Personal details
- Born: 16 June 1653 Grimsthorpe Castle, Lincolnshire, Kingdom of England
- Died: 22 May 1699 (aged 45) City and Liberty of Westminster, Kingdom of England
- Spouse(s): Eleanora Lee; Catherine Chamberlayne
- Children: Montagu Venables-Bertie, 2nd Earl of Abingdon; Hon. James Bertie; Hon. Henry Bertie; Lady Bridget Bertie; Lady Anne Bertie
- Parents: Montagu Bertie, 2nd Earl of Lindsey (father); Bridget Wray, 4th Baroness Norreys (mother)

James Bertie, 1st Earl of Abingdon (16 June 1653 – 22 May 1699), styled Hon. James Bertie until 1657 and known as the 5th Baron Norreys from 1657 until 1682, was an English nobleman.

== Early life and relations ==
Bertie was the eldest son of Montagu Bertie, 2nd Earl of Lindsey, by his second wife, Bridget Bertie (née Wray), 4th Baroness Norreys. His father, who had five sons by his previous marriage, was a royalist of impeccable credentials, and the head of an influential Lincolnshire family. While James' position as a sixth son might have limited his prospects, he was his mother's eldest son, and upon her death in c.1657, he became the 5th Baron Norreys of Rycote. Together with the peerage, he inherited from his mother considerable estates, including the manors of Rycote, Albury, Wendlebury, Chesterton, Dorchester, Thame, Beckley and Horton in Oxfordshire, and Wytham, Cumnor and Frilsham, all then in Berkshire. These extensive estates would provide him with a base of political power in Oxfordshire. The marriage in the early 1650s of his half-sister Bridget to Sir Thomas Osborne would also prove of great advantage to the Berties, as Osborne rose to become Duke of Leeds and one of the eminent politicians of the later Stuart era. Osborne was on particularly good terms with Lord Norreys, and often stayed and hunted with him at Rycote.

On 1 February 1671/2, Norreys married Eleanor Lee at Adderbury. She was the elder daughter and coheir of Sir Henry Lee, 3rd Baronet and his wife Anne Danvers, both of whom had died in 1659. The Danvers estates were left in trust for Eleanor and her sister Anne, who married Thomas Wharton in 1673; Eleanor's aunt Elizabeth, wife of Robert Villiers, later Danvers, was also a beneficiary, but the trustees bought out her share in the year of Anne's marriage. Litigation arose between Norreys, Wharton, and their wives over the trust, and a partition of the estates in 1681 made Abingdon, as he then was, and his wife the sole owners of the manors of West Lavington, Marden, and Patney, Wiltshire. They also received Anne's share in the manor of Westbury, Wiltshire and bought her aunt Elizabeth's share, the whole manor being settled on them in 1689. The manor of Bradenstoke was divided between Anne and her aunt Elizabeth until 1683, when Abingdon bought out Elizabeth's interest.

Norreys and his wife had six sons and three daughters:

- Montagu Venables-Bertie, 2nd Earl of Abingdon (1673–1743)
- Hon. James Bertie (1674–1735)
- Hon. Henry Bertie (1675–1735)
- Hon. Robert Bertie (28 February 1676 – 6 August 1710)
- Capt. Hon. Peregrine Bertie (2 February 1677 – 1709), commanded HMS Ruby, died a prisoner of war in France
- Rev. Hon. Charles Bertie (1678–1747)
- Lady Bridget Bertie (before 1683 – 13 June 1753), married Richard Bulkeley, 4th Viscount Bulkeley
- Lady Anne Bertie (died 1734), married Sir William Courtenay, 2nd Baronet
- Lady Mary Bertie (died 31 October 1718), unmarried.

Upon the death of Lord Saye and Sele in 1674, Norreys replaced him as Lord Lieutenant of Oxfordshire. He first took his seat in the House of Lords on 13 April 1675. As befitted his royalist descent and connection with Osborne, now Earl of Danby and Lord High Treasurer, Norreys belonged to the court party, later the Tories. It was Danby who composed a quarrel between Norreys and Lord Rochester in September 1678 and averted a duel.

== Court supporter in Oxford ==
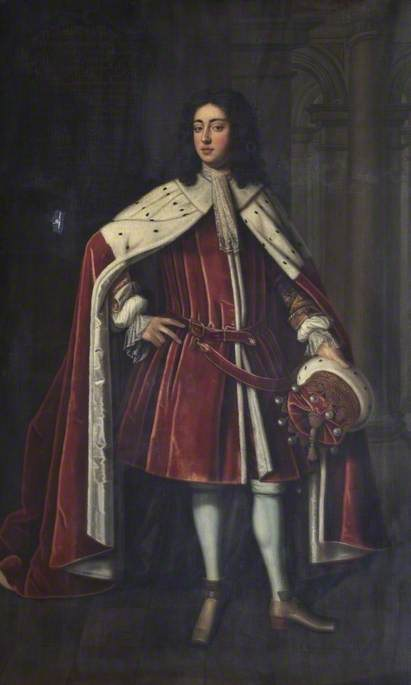
James Bertie following his elevation to the earldom of Abingdon

The imaginary revelations of the Popish Plot, and the popular disdain for the policy of Charles II which Danby had carried out, led to a violent political reaction against Catholicism and the court party, managed in part by Danby's rival Lord Shaftesbury. The King dissolved the Cavalier Parliament, and new elections were held in February 1678/9. Norreys campaigned in Oxford and Oxfordshire for the court candidates to the new Parliament, but without success: he was shouted out of the streets of Oxford by a mob. The country party dominated the Commons, and Danby was forced to resign his offices. A royal pardon only heightened the outrage against him, and he was committed to the Tower of London while the Commons, who had impeached him, debated his fate with the Lords. Norreys remained a staunch supporter of the court, and Danby, corresponding with the King from the Tower that summer, recommended his advancement in the peerage. Although enthusiastic, Norreys was notoriously unwell, having suffered from "black jaundice" (perhaps Weil's disease), reputedly to the point of interfering with his parliamentary business.

The opposition of Shaftesbury had rendered the two Parliaments summoned in 1679 quite unmanageable by the court. The King determined to hold a new Parliament in Oxford in 1681, hoping to draw on the city's traditional royalist loyalties. Norreys and John Fell, who had been the court's managers in the previous two elections, were entrusted with the preparations for holding the new Parliament. Fell managed to arrange a truce between Norreys and Lord Lovelace, the principal Whig electioneer in the borough, while Norreys took care of the logistical details of hosting Parliament. Happily for him, the officer in the Royal Household responsible for accommodating Parliament, the Lord Great Chamberlain, was his eldest half-brother, Lord Lindsey. The elections to the Oxford Parliament did not prove any more favourable to the court party than those preceding, but Norreys played out his role as Lord Lieutenant and host, leading a troop of horse to escort the King from the border of Oxfordshire to the Parliament. Norreys also took the somewhat daring step of presenting a petition to the Lords for the bail of Danby, still languishing in the Tower; opinion was divided, and the matter was put aside for a few days on the suggestion of Lord Halifax. It was not taken up again: a secret treaty with France had relieved the King's need for supply, and a popular reaction against the Whigs had begun to grow. Charles was disinclined to wrangle with another Exclusionist parliament and abruptly dissolved it after a week.

In July, the town clerk of Oxford died, and Norreys recommended Thomas Baker as a Tory candidate for the post to Sir Leoline Jenkins, the Southern secretary. Norreys acknowledged that Edward Prince, the Whig candidate, was likely to prove more popular, and the intervention of the Duke of Monmouth against Baker indeed secured Prince the vote on 11 August. An altercation ensued with Brome Whorwood, the late Whig MP for the borough, during the election: after an exchange of insults, wherein Norreys called Whorwood an "old knave" and was called a "young rogue" in turn, Norreys then proceeded to beat Whorwood with his cane. Norreys was apparently ready to duel Lord Lovelace (in place of the aged Whorwood) over the matter, but Lovelace declined to take up the quarrel, and Bishop Fell managed to patch up affairs between Norreys and Whorwood before they could reach the courts.

Norreys by now had a much more important commission in hand from the court. As the Tory reaction gained strength, the court now proceeded, on rather specious grounds, against some of the Whigs for conspiring to depose the King. Jurisdiction over Edward Fitzharris at law had been debated between Commons and Lords in the late Parliament; the dissolution of Parliament cleared the way for his condemnation in the Court of King's Bench, and proceedings were then set afoot against Stephen College, a virulent anti-Catholic activist. The grand jury of Middlesex, which was Whiggish, failed to indict College; he was then brought before the Oxfordshire assizes for alleged misdeeds there. College had been a prominent figure at the assembly of the Oxford Parliament, riding into town armed and armoured to protect Protestantism, he claimed, from a Catholic rebellion. This can hardly have endeared him to Norreys, charged with keeping the peace in Oxford for the duration of the Parliament, and it was understood that he would engineer a successful indictment of College. Such was indeed the case: College was charged with sedition before a grand jury whose foreman was Norreys' younger brother Henry and committed to trial. Norreys presided over the trial, held on 17 and 18 August 1681. College and his counsel, Aaron Smith, put up as good a defence as could be expected, and much of the evidence against him was circumstantial; but he could hardly hope to escape, and was promptly condemned to death. This result was greatly satisfactory to the court, and on 30 November 1682, Norreys was created Earl of Abingdon by letters patent.

As Lord Lieutenant, Abingdon mustered the Oxfordshire Militia when Monmouth's Rebellion broke out in 1685. After the militia marched to confront the rebels in the West Country, with Abingdon's brother Henry commanding the troop of horse, the University of Oxford resolved to raise volunteers to defend the city. Abingdon commanded and trained the horse himself, while his eldest son, Lord Norreys was elected captain of the foot company raised at Christ Church College.

== Break with James II ==
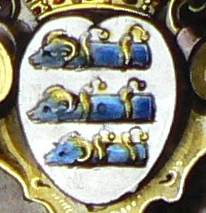
James Bertie's coat of arms

As James II adopted increasingly forceful pro-Catholic policies, many Tories found themselves forced to choose between support for the Court and support for the Established Church. Abingdon sided with the Church: in particular, he took the side of the fellows of Magdalen College in their quarrel with the King, which began in the spring of 1687. His division from the Court signaled his rapprochement with the borough of Oxford: on 16 September 1687, he was unanimously elected high steward of Oxford by the corporation, succeeding the Duke of Buckingham. In October 1687, James II issued the "Three Questions" to his lord lieutenants, intended to identify supporters of his programme to remove the legal disabilities against Catholics. The lord lieutenants were to address these questions to members of the commission of the peace in their respective counties and remove those hostile to Catholic tolerance. Abingdon, in a candid exchange with the King, refused to take part in this program. He further offended his master by his continued support for the fellows of Magdalen. When they were ejected on 16 November by the Ecclesiastical Commission, he offered them his hospitality at Rycote. This act of defiance was not to be borne, and Abingdon was dismissed from the lord-lieutenancy and replaced by his wife's first cousin, the Earl of Lichfield.

As James' program for generating a compliant government escalated, the borough of Oxford was "regulated", and the corporation dissolved in June 1688 by Order in Council. A new charter was issued in September, the patent for which named Lichfield as high steward in place of Abingdon. With the Glorious Revolution imminent, James reversed course in October and annulled the charters of 1684 and 1688. Abingdon was unanimously re-elected high steward, an event celebrated widely, if not universally, in the borough. During the year, he also bought the manor of Littleton Panell, adjacent to his West Lavington estate, from Robert Tyderlegh and his wife, Mary.

It was far too late, however, to recall Abingdon to his allegiance to James. Danby had signed the Invitation to William in June, and many of the Berties, including Abingdon, had been drawn into the conspiracy by September. In November 1688, Abingdon defected to join William, leading 50 horsemen out of Oxford to William's headquarters in Exeter, the first of the peers to openly take up arms on his behalf.

== After the Revolution ==
Abingdon's Tory principles were not abated by his role in the Revolution. After the flight of James, he voted against declaring the throne vacant. Nonetheless, he was reappointed Lord Lieutenant of Oxfordshire on 3 May 1689 to replace Lichfield, and custos rotulorum of the county on 9 July, replacing the resolutely Jacobite Earl of Clarendon. The two offices were thereafter united. Late in the year, Abingdon defended his conduct in the trial of Stephen College against an attack by the Earl of Macclesfield. While the attack was not pursued, Abingdon's political history at Oxford left his position under William always somewhat insecure, despite the renewed influence at court of Danby, now Marquess of Carmarthen. He remained active in local politics in Berkshire, Oxfordshire, and Wiltshire. During the 1690 elections, he put up his son Lord Norreys, the sitting member for Berkshire, up for Oxfordshire as well. This was a prudent move: Norreys was defeated in Berkshire (he may not even have gone to the poll there), but was returned for Oxfordshire after a bruising campaign which included accusations of Jacobitism levelled against Abingdon, which so dispirited him he considered resigning the lord-lieutenancy, much to the dismay of Clarendon.

Abingdon's wife Eleanora died suddenly on 31 May 1691 at West Lavington and was buried there on 6 June.

In 1693, on the death of his political rival Lord Lovelace, Carmarthen obtained for Abingdon the post of Justice in Eyre south of the River Trent. The patronage of the post included a secretaryship to the justice, which he gave to his half-brother Charles.

Abingdon's health, never good, continued to plague him throughout the decade, and Charles reported in January 1694 that Abingdon suffered badly from shortness of breath. Carmarthen was made Duke of Leeds that year, but a Whig attack on him for accepting bribes drove him from office in 1695. Abingdon was increasingly at odds with the Whig-dominated government; to this was added the old quarrel over the Danvers estates with his wife's brother-in-law, Lord Wharton, one of the members of the Junto. His refusal to sign the Association in 1696 gave grounds to dismiss him from his offices as Justice and Lord Lieutenant the following year.

He made a second marriage to Catherine Chamberlayne, daughter of Reverend Sir Thomas Chamberlayne and Margaret, daughter of Edmund Prideaux, on 15 April 1698 at Stanwell. They had no children. Abingdon died at Westminster on 22 May 1699, and was succeeded in the Earldom by his eldest son Montagu. He was buried at Rycote on 29 May. His client, Robert Gould, wrote an eclogue lamenting his death, which he dedicated to the Duke of Leeds.

== Legacy ==
James Bertie was the namesake of Abingdon Island in the Galapagos Islands, now renamed Isla Pinta by Ecuador.

== Notes ==
Legal offices
Preceded by The Lord Lovelace	Justice in Eyre south of the Trent; 1693–1697	Succeeded by The Lord Wharton
Honorary titles
Preceded by The Viscount Saye and Sele	Lord Lieutenant of Oxfordshire; 1674–1687	Succeeded by The Earl of Lichfield
Preceded by The Earl of Lichfield	Lord Lieutenant of Oxfordshire; 1689–1697	Succeeded by The Lord Wharton
Preceded by The Earl of Clarendon	Custos Rotulorum of Oxfordshire; 1689–1697	Succeeded by The Lord Wharton
Peerage of England
New creation	Earl of Abingdon; 1682–1699	Succeeded by Montagu Venables-Bertie
Preceded by Bridget Bertie	Baron Norreys c. 1657–1699	Succeeded by Montagu Venables-Bertie
