= Lord Lieutenant of Oxfordshire =

Civil post in Oxfordshire, England

This is a list of people who have served as Lord Lieutenant of Oxfordshire. Since 1689, all Lords Lieutenant have also been Custos Rotulorum of Oxfordshire.

Name	Date of appointment	End date
Charles Brandon, 1st Duke of Suffolk	1545	1545
William Parr, 1st Marquess of Northampton	1552	1553
Sir Richard Blount	1559	1561
Sir Francis Knollys	1565	1565
Henry Norris, 1st Baron Norreys	17 September 1586	27 June 1601
Sir Francis Knollys	12 September 1586	19 July 1596
William Knollys, 1st Earl of Banbury	4 November 1596	25 May 1632
Thomas Howard, 1st Earl of Berkshire	26 March 1628	1642
William Fiennes, 1st Viscount Saye and Sele	1642	1642
Henry Cary, 4th Viscount Falkland	17 July 1660	2 April 1663
Edward Hyde, 1st Earl of Clarendon	19 June 1663	11 March 1668
James Fiennes, 2nd Viscount Saye and Sele	11 March 1668	15 March 1674
James Bertie, 1st Earl of Abingdon	1 April 1674	21 November 1687
Edward Lee, 1st Earl of Lichfield	5 December 1687	3 May 1689
James Bertie, 1st Earl of Abingdon	3 May 1689	15 May 1697
Thomas Wharton, 1st Baron Wharton	15 May 1697	11 June 1702
Montagu Venables-Bertie, 2nd Earl of Abingdon	11 June 1702	8 February 1706
John Churchill, 1st Duke of Marlborough	8 February 1706	17 May 1712
Montagu Venables-Bertie, 2nd Earl of Abingdon	17 May 1712	14 October 1715
Francis Godolphin, 2nd Earl of Godolphin	14 October 1715	26 January 1739
Charles Spencer, 3rd Duke of Marlborough	26 January 1739	20 October 1758
George Spencer, 4th Duke of Marlborough	21 March 1760	29 January 1817
George Parker, 4th Earl of Macclesfield	10 May 1817	20 March 1842
George Spencer-Churchill, 6th Duke of Marlborough	22 April 1842	1 July 1857
John Spencer-Churchill, 7th Duke of Marlborough	25 August 1857	4 July 1883
Sir Henry Dashwood, 5th Baronet	17 August 1883	23 June 1887
Victor Child Villiers, 7th Earl of Jersey	23 June 1887	31 May 1915
Charles Spencer-Churchill, 9th Duke of Marlborough	3 August 1915	30 June 1934
Vivian Smith, 1st Baron Bicester	15 August 1934	26 November 1954
George Parker, 7th Earl of Macclesfield	26 November 1954	28 May 1963
Sir John Thomson	28 May 1963	2 January 1980
Sir Ashley Ponsonby, 2nd Baronet	2 January 1980	20 March 1996
Sir Hugo Brunner	20 March 1996	31 August 2008
Sir Tim Stevenson	31 August 2008	30 September 2021
Marjorie Glasgow	1 October 2021	

== Deputy lieutenants ==
A deputy lieutenant of Oxfordshire is commissioned by the Lord Lieutenant of Oxfordshire. Deputy lieutenants support the work of the lord-lieutenant. There can be several deputy lieutenants at any time, depending on the population of the county. Their appointment does not terminate with the changing of the lord-lieutenant, but they usually retire at age 75.

=== 19th century ===
- 28 February 1831: Francis George Spencer
- 28 February 1831: Charles Peers
- 28 February 1831: Richard Weyland
- 28 February 1831: William Francis Lowndes Stone
- 28 February 1831: Walter Strickland
- 28 February 1831: John Brown
- 28 February 1831: John Bayley
- 28 February 1831: Thomas Stonor
- 28 February 1831: Colonel John Fane
- 8 March 1831: Sir Henry John Lambert
- 8 March 1831: James Haughton Langston
- 6 April 1831: J. W. Henley
- 4 August 1852: Lord Alan Spencer-Churchill
- 4 August 1852: Thomas Stonor, 3rd Baron Camoys
- 4 August 1852: Percy Barrington, 8th Viscount Barrington
- 4 August 1852: General Sir William Knollys
- 4 August 1852: Major George Hall
- 4 August 1852: Joseph Phillimore
- 4 August 1852: Hugh Hamersley
- 4 August 1852: George Henry Earnett
- 4 August 1852: Henry Barnett
- 4 August 1852: Richard Aubrey Cartwright
- 4 August 1852: James Patrick Muirhead
- 4 August 1852: William Barrington Reade
- 4 August 1852: William Henry Stone
- 4 August 1852: Frederick Whitaker
- 4 August 1852: Henry Norris
- 4 August 1852: Joseph John Henley
- 4 August 1852: Clement Cottrell Dormer
- 4 August 1852: Henry Hall
- 4 August 1852: Arthur Henry Clerke Brown
- 4 August 1852: William Elias Taunton
- 4 August 1852: William Earle Tyndale
- 4 August 1852: Archer Robert Tawney
- 4 August 1852: William Weinyss Methven Dewar
