= Thomas Wancklyn =

17th-century English MP for Westbury, Wiltshire

Member of the House of Commons of England

Personal details
- Died: 1694
- Spouse: Mary (née Capell) Ley (m. 1647; died 1670) Frances Brandsby (m. 1671)

Thomas Wancklyn (died c1694), of Heywood House, Westbury, was an English politician who sat in the House of Commons during the late 17th century. He represented Westbury as a Member of Parliament and was active in local Wiltshire affairs.

Wancklyn may have married three times. On 7 August 1647, he married Mary (née Capell) Ley, the widow of Henry Ley, 2nd Earl of Marlborough and daughter of Arthur Capell, 1st Baron Capell of Hadham. Mary died 2 June 1670. The following year, Wancklyn married Frances Brandsby, also a widow, on 9 July 1671. He may have also married a third woman named Mary.

Wancklyn died in 1694.
