= Mark McDonnell, 5th Earl of Antrim =

Captain The Right Honourable The Earl of Antrim DL
- Born: Mark Kerr; 3 April 1814; London, England
- Died: 19 December 1869 (aged 55)
- Spouse: Jane Emma Hannah Macan (m. 1849; died 1869)
- Children: 10, including William, Schomberg
- Parent(s): Lord Mark Robert Kerr; Charlotte Kerr, 3rd Countess of Antrim (née MacDonnell)
- Relatives: William Kerr, 5th Marquess of Lothian (grandfather); Randal MacDonnell, 1st Marquess of Antrim (grandfather); Frances Vane, Marchioness of Londonderry (cousin)

Captain Mark McDonnell, 5th Earl of Antrim DL (né Kerr; 3 April 1814 – 19 December 1869), was an Anglo-Irish peer of Irish and Scottish descent who served in the Royal Navy.

== Early life ==
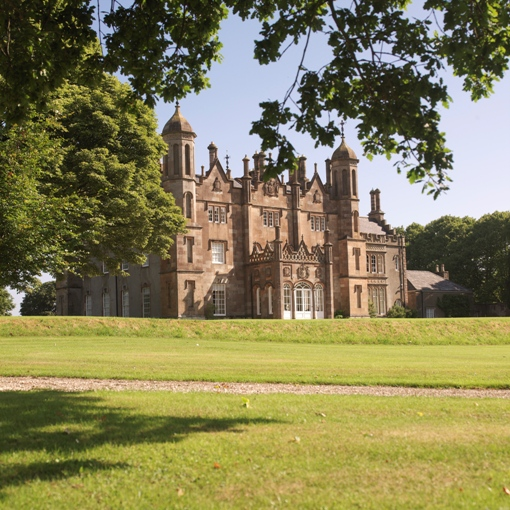
Glenarm Castle, the seat of the Earls of Antrim

Born Mark Kerr on 3 April 1814, he was baptised on 21 April 1814 at St Marylebone Parish Church. He was the seventh son of Vice-Admiral Lord Mark Kerr and Charlotte Kerr, 3rd Countess of Antrim (née MacDonnell).

Among his many siblings were Lady Georgina Anne Emily Kerr (who married the Rev. Hon. Frederic Bertie, son of the 4th Earl of Abingdon), Lady Caroline Mary Kerr (who married the Rev. Horace Robert Pechell, parents of Adm. Mark Robert Pechell), Lady Charlotte Kerr (who married Sir George Osborn, 6th Baronet), Lady Emily Frances Kerr (who married Henry Richardson and Sir Steuart Macnaghten, son of Sir Francis Workman-Macnaghten, 1st Baronet), Lady Letitia Louise Kerr (who married Cortlandt MacGregor Skinner), Charles Fortescue Kerr, styled Viscount Dunluce, Hugh McDonnell (who married Lady Laura Cecilia Parker, daughter of the 5th Earl of Macclesfield), and Lady Frederica Augusta Kerr (who married Montagu Bertie, 5th Earl of Abingdon).

His father was the third son of William Kerr, 5th Marquess of Lothian, and Elizabeth Fortescue (a daughter of Chichester Fortescue of Dromisken). His maternal grandparents were Randal MacDonnell, 1st Marquess of Antrim, and Hon. Letitia (née Morres) Trevor (widow of the Hon. Arthur Trevor and eldest daughter of 1st Viscount Mountmorres). His maternal aunt was Anne MacDonnell, 2nd Countess of Antrim (who married Sir Henry Vane-Tempest, 2nd Baronet, and Edmund Phelps), who succeeded hto er father's earldom while the marquessate became extinct upon his death in 1791. Through his aunt Anne, he was a first cousin of Frances Vane, Marchioness of Londonderry.

== Career ==
Kerr was a Captain in the Royal Navy and served as Deputy Lieutenant of County Antrim.

Upon the death of his elder brother on 19 July 1855, he succeeded as the 5th Viscount Dunluce and the 5th Earl of Antrim, both in the Peerage of Ireland. On 8 November 1855, his name was legally changed to Mark McDonnell by royal licence.

== Personal life ==
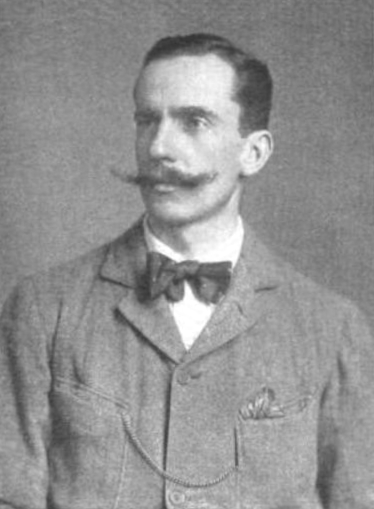
Photograph of his son, Sir Schomberg Kerr McDonnell, in The Sketch, 17 January 1900

On 27 April 1849, Kerr married Jane Emma Hannah Macan (1824–1892), daughter of Maj. Turner Macan of the British Army and Harriet Sneyd (a daughter of Rev. Wettenhall Sneyd), who later married William Henry Whitbread. Together, they were the parents of ten children, including:

- William McDonnell, 6th Earl of Antrim (1851–1918), who married Lady Louisa Jane Grey, daughter of Lt.-Gen. Hon. Charles Grey (Private Secretary to the Sovereign) and Caroline Eliza Farquhar, in 1875.
- Hon. Mark Henry Horace McDonnell (1852–1909), who married his cousin, Emily Fanny Dorothy Osborn, daughter of Sir George Osborn, 6th Baronet, and Lady Charlotte Kerr, in 1892.
- Lady Caroline Elizabeth McDonnell (c. 1854–1930), who married Rev. Hon. Alberic Edward Bertie, son of Montagu Bertie, 6th Earl of Abingdon, and Elizabeth Vernon-Harcourt, in 1881.
- Hon. Hugh Seymour McDonnell (1855–1879), who died unmarried.
- Hon. Alexander McDonnell (1857–1945), a Clerk of the Parliaments who never married.
- Lady Mabel Harriet McDonnell (1858–1942), who married Henry Charles Howard, son of Henry Howard and Charlotte Caroline Georgina Long, in 1878.
- Lady Evelyn McDonnell (1860–1947), who died unmarried.
- Hon. Sir Schomberg Kerr McDonnell (1861–1915), the Principal Private Secretary to the Prime Minister; he married Ethel Henry Davis, daughter of Maj. Alexander Henry Davis, in 1913.
- Lady Jane Grey McDonnell (1863–1953), who married her second cousin once-removed, Charles Hepburn-Stuart-Forbes-Trefusis, 21st Baron Clinton, son of Charles Hepburn-Stuart-Forbes-Trefusis, 20th Baron Clinton, and Harriet Williamina Hepburn-Forbes (a daughter of Sir John Hepburn-Forbes, 8th Baronet), in 1886. They were the maternal grandparents of Anne Bowes-Lyon, Nerissa Bowes-Lyon, and Katherine Bowes-Lyon.
- Lady Helena McDonnell (1865–1948), who married Capt. Charles Barrington Balfour, first cousin of Prime Minister Arthur Balfour, son of Charles Balfour and Hon. Adelaide Barrington (a daughter of the 6th Viscount Barrington), in 1888. They were the parents of the diplomat John Balfour.

Lord Antrim died on 19 December 1869. He was succeeded in his titles by his eldest son, William. His widow, the dowager Countess of Antrim, died on 21 April 1892 at Fettwecairne House, Kincardineshire, Scotland.

Peerage of Ireland
Preceded by Hugh McDonnell	Earl of Antrim; 1855–1869	Succeeded by William McDonnell
