= Thomas Parker, 6th Earl of Macclesfield =

British politician (1811–1896)

The Right Honourable The Earl of Macclesfield
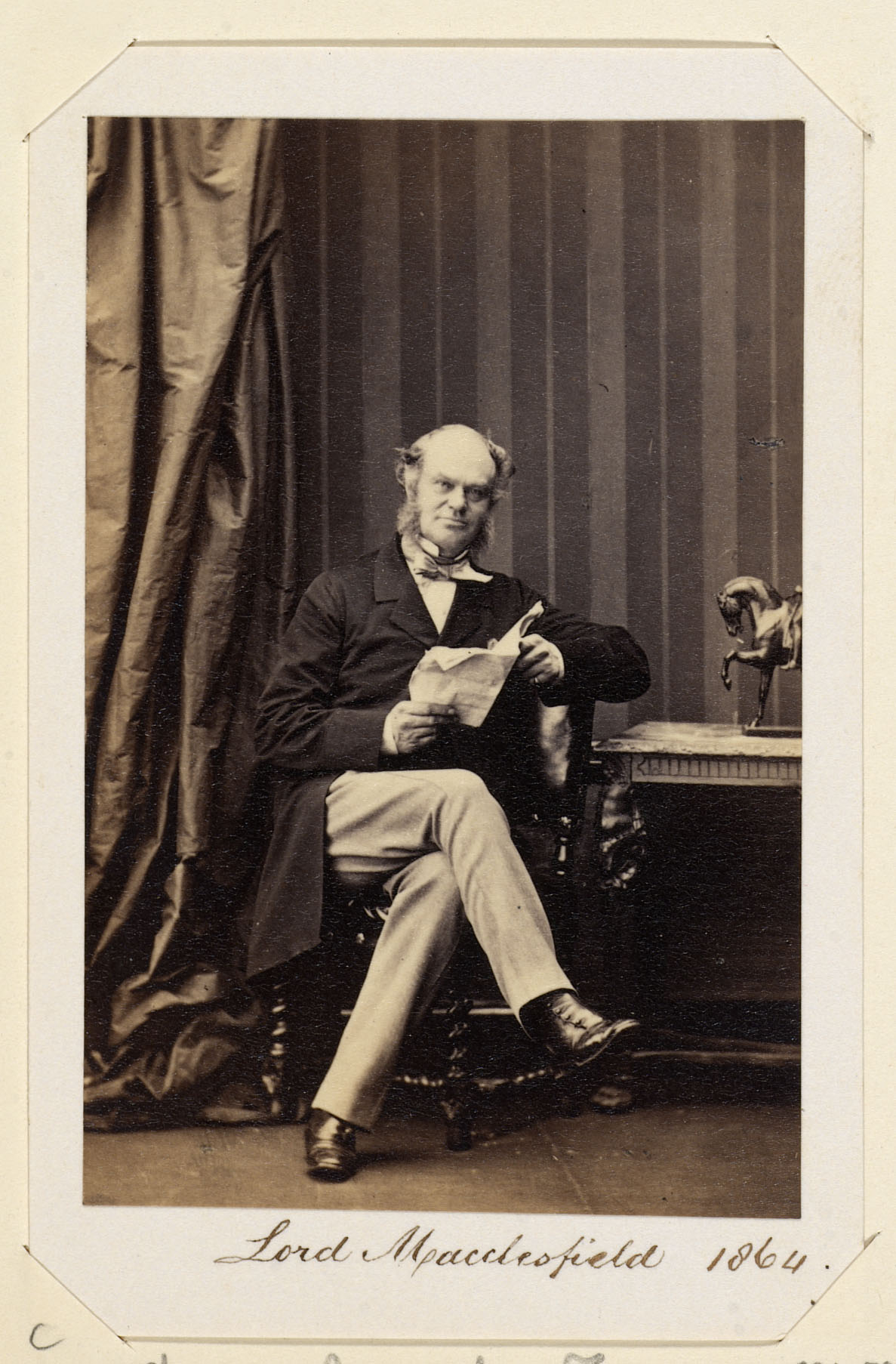
- Lord Macclesfield, 1864

Member of Parliament for Oxfordshire
- In office 1837–1841 Serving with Lord Norreys, George Harcourt
- Preceded by: Richard Weyland; Lord Norreys; George Harcourt
- Succeeded by: Joseph Warner Henley; Lord Norreys; George Harcourt

Personal details
- Born: Thomas Augustus Wolstenholme Parker; 17 March 1811
- Died: 24 July 1896 (aged 85)
- Party: Conservative
- Spouse(s): Henrietta Turnor (m. 1839; died 1839) Lady Mary Frances Grosvenor (m. 1842; died 1896)
- Relations: Caroline Parker (granddaughter)
- Parent(s): Thomas Parker, 5th Earl of Macclesfield; Eliza Wolstenholme
- Education: Christ Church, Oxford

Arms of Parker, Earls of Macclesfield: Gules, a chevron between three leopard's faces or

Thomas Augustus Wolstenholme Parker, 6th Earl of Macclesfield (17 March 1811 – 24 July 1896), styled Viscount Parker from 1842 to 1850, was a British peer. Before inheriting the earldom, he sat in the House of Commons as Conservative Member of Parliament for Oxfordshire from 1837 until 1841.

== Early life ==
Thomas Augustus Wolstenholme Parker was born on 17 March 1811. He was the only son of Thomas Parker, 5th Earl of Macclesfield, and, his second wife, the former Eliza Wolstenholme. From his father's first marriage, he had several half-sisters, Lady Ellen Catherine Parker (who married Col. John William Fane, MP for Oxfordshire), Lady Amelia Parker (who married William Montgomery, a grandson of the 1st Viscount Bangor), and Lady Matilda Anne Parker (who married Arthur Hill Montgomery of Tyrells, County Down). From his parents' marriage, he had two sisters, Lady Lavinia Agnes Parker (who married the Hon. John Thomas Dutton of Hinton House, Alresford, son of the 2nd Baron Sherborne), and Lady Laura Cecilia Parker (who married Hugh Seymour McDonnell, 4th Earl of Antrim).

His paternal grandparents were Thomas Parker, 3rd Earl of Macclesfield and the former Mary Heathcote (a daughter of Sir William Heathcote, 1st Baronet). His maternal grandfather was William Breton Wolstenholme of Holly Hill, Sussex (who add the surname Wolstenholme to inherit from his mother's family, including his grandfather, Sir William Wolstenholme, 5th Baronet).

He was educated at Christ Church, Oxford.

== Career ==
From 1837 until 1841, he sat in the House of Commons as Conservative Member of Parliament for Oxfordshire. He later served as Vice-Lord-Lieutenant of Oxfordshire.

== Personal life ==
Parker was twice married. His first marriage was on 11 July 1839 to Henrietta Turnor, daughter of Edmond Turnor, She died four months later on 19 November 1839.

On 25 August 1842, he married, secondly, to Lady Mary Frances Grosvenor (1821–1912), daughter of Richard Grosvenor, 2nd Marquess of Westminster and Lady Elizabeth Mary Leveson-Gower (a daughter of the 1st Duke of Sutherland). She was sister of Hugh Grosvenor, 1st Duke of Westminster. The couple had at least fifteen children, including:

- George Augustus Parker (1843–1895), styled, Viscount Parker, a Major in the Oxfordshire Yeomanry Cavalry who married Edith Harford, daughter of Frederick Paul Harford, in 1878. After her death in 1895, he married Carine Agnes Loveden, daughter of Pryse Loveden, in 1887.
- Hon. Cecil Thomas Parker (1845–1931), who married Rosamond Esther Harriet Longley, daughter of Charles Thomas Longley, Archbishop of Canterbury. Her brother-in-law was Maj. Edward Levett of Rowsley, Derbyshire, whose first wife was Caroline Georgina Longley, also a daughter of Archbishop Longley.
- Lady Elizabeth Amelia Parker (1846–1916), who died unmarried.
- Lady Adelaide Helen Parker (1848–1941), who married Hon. William Frederick Dawnay, son of William Dawnay, 7th Viscount Downe, in 1875.
- Hon. Algernon Robert Parker (1849–1940), who served as rector of Bix in Oxfordshire and Malpas in Cheshire; he married Emma Jane Anne Kenyon, daughter of Hon. Edward Kenyon (a son of the 2nd Baron Kenyon) and Caroline Susan Catherine Beresford (granddaughter of the 1st Marquess of Waterford), in 1877.
- Hon. Francis Parker (1851–1931), who served as MP for Henley; he married Henrietta Gaskell, daughter of Henry Lomax Gaskell, in 1882.
- Hon. Sidney Parker (1852–1897), an early rugby union international who represented England in 1874 and 1875.
- Hon. Reginald Parker (1854–1942), who married Katharine May Ames, daughter of Henry Metcalfe Ames, in 1876.
- Hon. Hugh Lupus Parker (1855–1859), who died young.
- Hon. Edmund William Parker (1857–1943), who married Fanny Emma Baldwin, daughter of Capt. William Baldwin, in 1883.
- Hon. Archibald Parker (1859–1931), who served as rector of Wem in Shropshire; he married Hon. Maud Francis Bateman-Hanbury, daughter of William Bateman-Hanbury, 2nd Baron Bateman, in 1890.
- Hon. Henry Parker (1860–1952), who married Henrietta Judith Baker, daughter of Rev. Robert Lowbridge Baker and Henrietta Maria Hicks-Beach, in 1916.
- Lady Mary Alice Parker (1863–1930), who married Rt. Rev. Charles de Salis, Bishop of Taunton, son of Rev. Henry de Salis, in 1896.
- Hon. Alexander Edward Parker (1864–1958), who married Winifred Florence Worthington, daughter of Albert Octavius Worthington, in 1896.
- Lady Evelyn Florence Parker (1867–1957), who died unmarried.

Lord Macclesfield died at the age of 85. As his eldest son predeceased him, the earldom passed to his grandson George Loveden Parker.

=== Descendants ===
His son, the Rev. Hon. Algernon Robert Parker, was the great-great-grandfather of Andrew Parker Bowles, the first husband of Queen Camilla.

Parliament of the United Kingdom
Preceded by Richard Weyland; Lord Norreys; George Harcourt	Member of Parliament for Oxfordshire; 1837–1841; With: Lord Norreys; George Harcourt	Succeeded by Joseph Warner Henley; Lord Norreys; George Harcourt
Peerage of Great Britain
Preceded by Thomas Parker	Earl of Macclesfield; 1850–1896	Succeeded by George Parker
