= Sir John Murray-Macgregor, 3rd Baronet =

Scottish baronet and colonial administrator

Sir John Murray-Macgregor Bt

President of the British Virgin Islands
- In office 1851–1851
- Preceded by: Edward Drummond-Hay
- Succeeded by: John Cornell Chads

Personal details
- Born: John Atholl Bannatyne Murray; 20 January 1810
- Died: 11 May 1851 (aged 41) Government House, Tortola, British Virgin Islands
- Spouse: Mary Charlotte Hardy (m. 1833)
- Relations: Sir John Macgregor Murray, 1st Baronet (grandfather); John Murray, 4th Duke of Atholl (grandfather)
- Parent(s): Sir Evan Murray-Macgregor, 2nd Baronet; Lady Elizabeth Murray

Sir John Atholl Bannatyne Murray-Macgregor of Macgregor, 3rd Baronet (20 January 1810 – 11 May 1851) was a Scottish baronet and colonial administrator, who served briefly as President of the British Virgin Islands in 1851.

== Early life ==
John Atholl Bannatyne Murray was born on 20 January 1810. He was the eldest son of Lieutenant-Colonel (later Major-General) Evan John Murray (1785–1841), an officer in the British Army, and his wife Lady Elizabeth Murray (1787–1846). He had four younger brothers, Evan John William Murray-Macgregor, James Strathallan Murray-Macgregor, Lt. Francis Alexander Robert Murray-Macgregor, and Lt.-Col. Ernest Augustus Murray-Macgregor. In 1822, his father inherited the chieftaincy of Clan Gregor and the baronetcy created for his own father in 1795, after which Murray added Macgregor to his surname. Sir Evan later served as Governor of Dominica from 1831 to 1832, Antigua and the Leeward Islands from 1832 to 1836, and Barbados and the Windward Islands from 1836 to 1841.

His paternal grandparents were Capt. Sir John Macgregor Murray, 1st Baronet, an officer in the Bengal Army, and Anne Macleod (a daughter of Roderick Macleod, WS, of Edinburgh). His maternal grandparents were John Murray, 4th Duke of Atholl and the former Hon. Jane Cathcart (daughter of the 9th Lord Cathcart and Jane, Lady Cathcart).

== Career ==
In late 1850, Murray-Macgregor was appointed President of the British Virgin Islands. He arrived there in March 1851 and assumed office on 24 March, shortly before his death there on 11 May 1851.

== Personal life ==
On 14 November 1833, he married Mary Charlotte Hardy (d. 1896), youngest daughter and co-heiress of Rear-Admiral Sir Thomas Masterman Hardy, 1st Baronet and the former Anna Louisa Berkeley (daughter of Sir George Cranfield Berkeley). He had several children:

- Sir Malcolm Murray-MacGregor, 4th Baronet (1834–1879), a Rear Admiral in the Royal Navy; he married Lady Helen Laura McDonnell, daughter of Hugh McDonnell, 4th Earl of Antrim and Lady Laura Cecilia Parker (a daughter of the 5th Earl of Macclesfield), in 1864.
- Atholl Murray-Macgregor (1836–1922), who worked in the Indian Civil Service; (Note: His son, Robert Menzies Macgregor, CMG (1882–1946), served in the Indian Service Engineers and later as Irrigation Adviser to the Sudanese government.) he married Caroline Mary Stuart Menzies, daughter of Sir Robert Menzies, 7th Baronet and Annie Balcarres Stewart, in 1878.
- Emily Louisa Murray-Macgregor (c. 1839–1919), who married David Murray, Viscount Stormont, only son and heir apparent of William Murray, 4th Earl of Mansfield, in 1857.
- Sir Evan Murray-Macgregor (1842–1926), who became Permanent Secretary to the Admiralty; he married Annie Louise Middleton, daughter of Col. William Alexander Middleton, in 1884.
- Alpin Murray-Macgregor (1846–1899), a gentleman usher to Queen Victoria who died unmarried.
- Mary Elizabeth Murray-Macgregor (1848–1934), who married John Charles Thynne, son of Rev. Lord John Thynne (third son of the 2nd Marquess of Bath) and Anne Constantia Beresford, in 1871.

Sir John died at Government House on Tortola on 11 May 1851. His body was interred on the island in a lead coffin so that it could eventually be transported to buried in Scotland. His funeral on the Virgin Islands was attended by many and HMS Helena fired its minute guns in salute.

Government offices
Preceded by Edward Hay Drummond Hay	President of the British Virgin Islands; 1851–1851	Succeeded by John Cornell Chads
Baronetage of Great Britain
Preceded by Evan Murray-Macgregor	Baronet (of Lanrick); 1841–1851	Succeeded by Malcolm Murray-MacGregor
