= Alexander Murray Macgregor =

Major-General Alexander Murray MacGregor
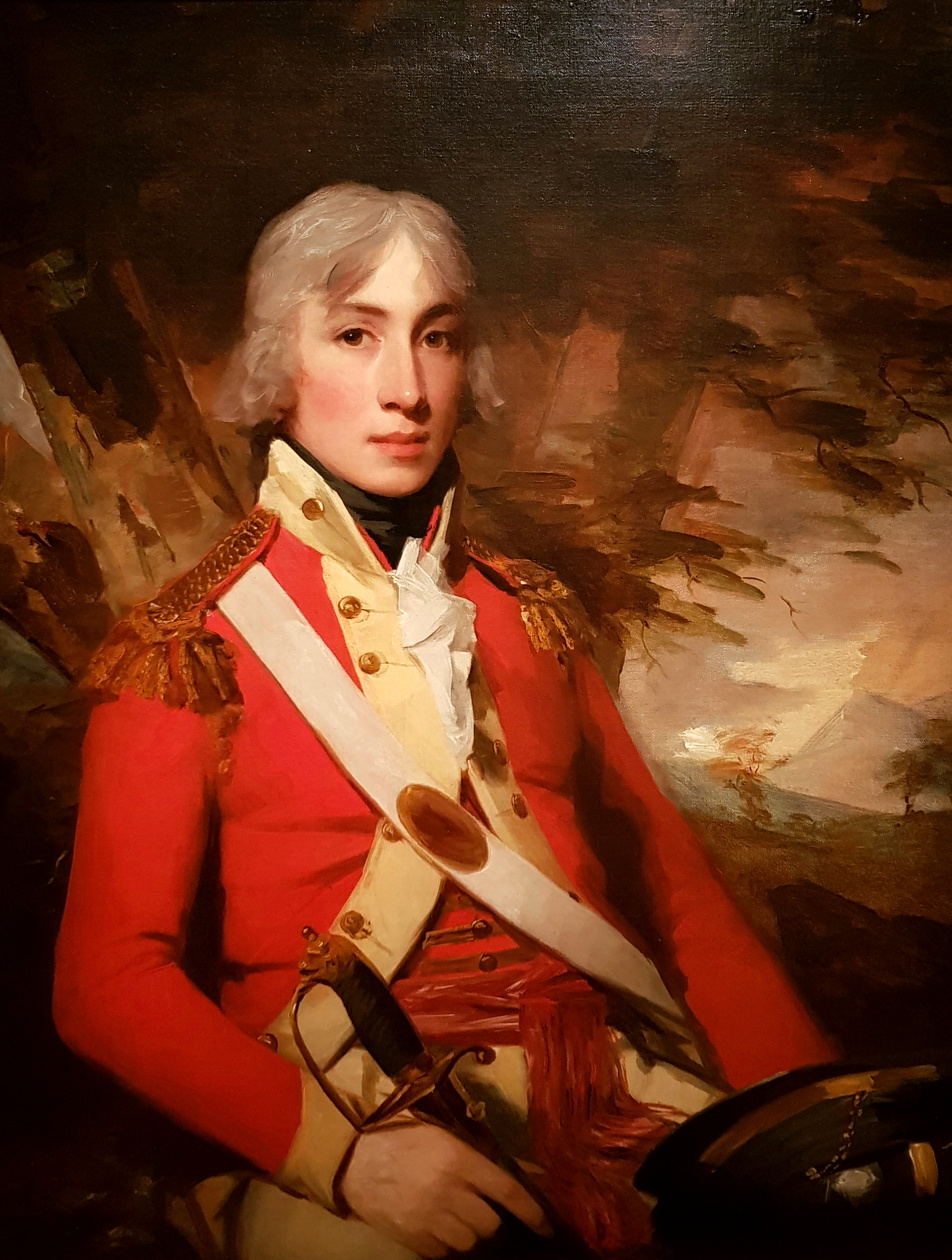
- MacGregor c.1795, by Henry Raeburn
- Born: Alexander Murray; 27 November 1778; Perthshire
- Died: 27 February 1827 (aged 48); Edinburgh
- Military career
- Allegiance: United Kingdom
- Branch: British Army
- Service years: 1794–1827
- Rank: Major-general
- Commands: 2/6th Regiment of Foot
- Conflicts: French Revolutionary Wars; Napoleonic Wars; Walcheren Campaign

Major-General Alexander Murray MacGregor (27 November 1778 – 20 August 1827), born Alexander Murray, was a British Army officer.

== Life ==
=== Clan Gregor ===
Alexander Murray was born on 27 November 1778, the second but only surviving son of Colonel Alexander Murray (1746–1822) of Napier Ruskie, Perthshire, an officer in the Royal Clan Alpin Fencibles, and his first wife Frances, daughter of Major Edmund Pascall. (Note: The elder son was Evan Edward Hastings Pascal (sometimes spelt Pascall or Paschall) Murray; a daughter, Frances Janetta, also died young.) Murray was part of Clan Gregor (or Macgregor), but his forebears had been forced to assume the surname Murray as a result of the persecution of the clan and the outlawing of their name from the 17th century onward. Murray's father was a younger son of Evan Murray, who had fought with his own elder brothers Robert and Duncan against the government in the Jacobite rising of 1745; in 1787, Evan's eldest son (and the younger Alexander Murray's uncle) John succeeded Duncan as chief of the clan and was created a baronet in 1795.

=== Military career ===
A number of Macgregor's relatives were officers in the British East India Company; his father had served in it as an officer, (Note: The elder Alexander served in Keith's Highlanders in Germany in 1762 and was then an Ensign in the 77th Regiment and then the 50th Foot until 1772. He joined the East India Company Army in 1772 as an Ensign, served in the Siege of Tanjore in 1773 and in the First Rohilla War (in St George's Battle, 1774). He was promoted to Lieutenant in 1778, served in the campaign against the Rajah of Benares in 1781 and was promoted to Brevet Captain in 1782, Captain in 1784, Local Major in 1782, Local Lieutenant-Colonel in 1783 and Local Colonel in 1785; he was Commander in Chief at British Bencoolen from 1782 to 1785 and, after eight years of furlough, resigned in 1793. He commanded the Royal Clan Alpine Fencibles from 1798.) as had his paternal uncles the baronet Sir John (who was Military Auditor General) and Peter Macgregor (an adjutant-general), and his cousins Sir Evan John Macgregor, 2nd Baronet, General John Alexander Paul Macgregor and General Sir Duncan Macgregor.

The younger Alexander Murray was commissioned as a captain in the 90th Perthshire Volunteers in 1796 and served in the regiment until 1800, when he moved to the Royal Clan Alpin Fencibles, of which his father was colonel. He was given the rank of major. After the Fencibles disbanded two years later, he transferred to the 67th Regiment and then in 1808 became lieutenant-colonel of the 1st Battalion of the 6th Regiment. He was with it when it carried out the Walcheren Expedition in 1809. In 1812, he became lieutenant-colonel in the 4th Ceylon Regiment and was promoted to the rank of colonel in the Army in 1814. He was placed on the half-pay list two years later and promoted to major-general in 1825.

== Family and later life ==
In 1810 Murray married Lady Charlotte Anne Sinclair, daughter of James Sinclair, 12th Earl of Caithness. They had seven children:

- Captain Alexander Nugent Murray Macgregor (died 1844), an officer in the Bengal Army, who married Eleanor, daughter of one Captain Hopper.
- Caithness Evan Edmund Murray Macgregor (died 1834).
- Colonel John Murray Macgregor (1819–1891), who married Mary Barbara, daughter of John Featherstone of Blackhall and Newbus Grange; his daughter Charlotte married Major-General John Elpinstone (died 1877).
- Major-General Evan Murray Macgregor (1822–1885) served in the cavalry in the East India Company's Army and the British Indian Army and was promoted to lieutenant-colonel in 1866, Brevet Colonel in 1871 and on retirement was granted the honorary rank of major-general in 1875. He married Sophie Mary Ann (died 1885), daughter of Charles Frederick Collier, inspector-general in the Indian Army, and had six children; he retired to Hobart, Tasmania, where he and his wife died.
- Jane Helen Campbell Murray Macgregor (died 1860), who married Colonel Alex Boyd Kerr, an officer in the Madras Rifles.
- Frances Grace Hay Murray Macgregor, who married Major-General Edward Every Miller (died 1877) and whose eldest daughter Charlotte (died 1880) married Lieutenant-General Sir Frederick Paul Haines, the Commander-in-Chief, India.
- Charlotte Murray Macgregor (died 1850), who had married James Alexander Cruikshank of Langley Park (died 1849), and died childless.

Murray had added the surname Macgregor to Murray in 1822. He died on 20 August 1827. His widow died on 7 April 1854.
