= Schomberg Kerr McDonnell =

British Army officer, politician, and civil servant

Major The Honourable Sir Schomberg Kerr McDonnell GCVO KCB FSA
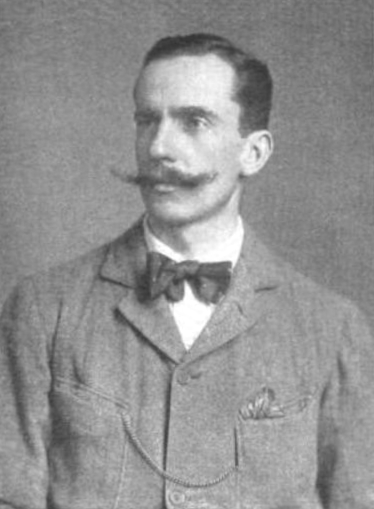
- In The Sketch, 17 January 1900

Principal Private Secretary to the Prime Minister
- In office 1888–1892
- Prime Minister: The Marquess of Salisbury
- Preceded by: Marquess of Granby
- Succeeded by: Sir Algernon West
- In office 1895–1902
- Prime Minister: The Marquess of Salisbury
- Preceded by: Sir Algernon West
- Succeeded by: John Satterfield Sandars

Personal details
- Born: 22 March 1861 Glenarm, Ireland
- Died: 23 November 1915 (aged 54) Ypres Salient, Belgium
- Resting place: Lijssenthoek Military Cemetery, Belgium
- Spouse: Ethel Henry Davis (m. 1913)
- Relatives: Earl of Antrim; Lord Mark Kerr
- Education: Eton College
- Alma mater: University College, Oxford
- Awards: CB (1892); KCB (1902); CVO (1901); KCVO (1911)

Military service
- Allegiance: United Kingdom
- Branch/service: British Army
- Years of service: 1899–1900; 1914–1915
- Rank: Captain; Major
- Unit: City of London Imperial Volunteers; 5th battalion Queen's Own Cameron Highlanders
- Battles/wars: Second Boer War; First world War

Major Sir Schomberg Kerr McDonnell, GCVO, KCB, FSA (22 March 1861 – 23 November 1915) was a British Army officer, politician, and civil servant, who was for a number of years Principal Private Secretary to the Prime Minister.

== Background ==
Kerr McDonnell was born at Glenarm in County Antrim the youngest son of ten children to Mark McDonnell, 5th Earl of Antrim (1814–1869), by his wife Jane Emma Hannah Macan (c. 1825–1892). His paternal grandfather Lord Mark Kerr (1776–1840) was a descendant of the Marquess of Lothian, whose wife Charlotte McDonnell (1779–1835) was the Countess of Antrim in her own right, hence the change of surname for their descendants.

He was educated at Eton College and at University College, Oxford. Whilst at Oxford he became a Freemason in the Apollo University Lodge, a Masonic lodge for students and former students of the university.

== Political career ==
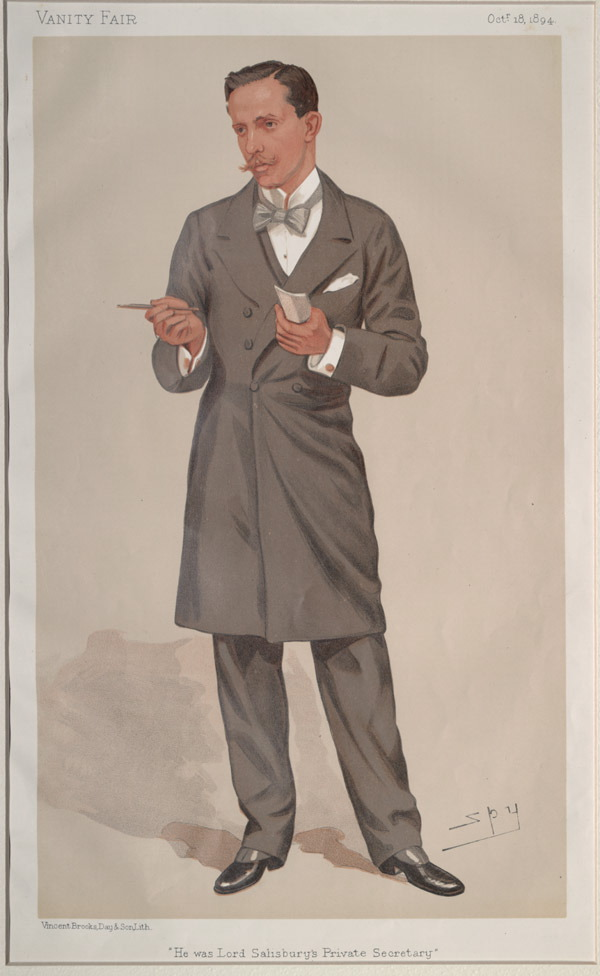
A caricature of Schomberg Kerr McDonnell in Vanity Fair, 18 October 1894

In 1888 Kerr McDonnell was appointed Principal Private Secretary to the Prime Minister, Lord Salisbury, and served as such while he was in office until 1892, and again from 1895 to 1902 (with a short interval while he fought in South Africa in 1900). He also served as private secretary to Lord Salisbury while he was Leader of the Opposition from 1892 to 1895. In failing health, Lord Salisbury resigned as Prime Minister in July 1902, and Kerr McDonnell received a non-political appointment, as Secretary to the Office of Works, a position he held until 1912. It was the duty of this department to look after the royal palaces, and the position brought him into close contact with the royal family.

Kerr McDonnell was an officer in the London Volunteer Rifles, where he was promoted to captain on 4 April 1900. Taking leave from his work for the Prime Minister, he took an active commission with the newly raised City of London Imperial Volunteers in late 1899. This corps was raised and equipped by the City of London for service during the Second Boer War, left for South Africa in January 1900, and returned in October the same year.

== Honours ==
Kerr McDonnell was appointed a Companion of the Order of the Bath (CB) in 1892, for his service to the outgoing Prime Minister. He was promoted to a Knight Commander (KCB) of the Order in the 1902 Coronation Honours list published on 26 June 1902, and received the knighthood in a private audience with King Edward VII on 2 August, during the King's convalescence on board HMY Victoria and Albert. He was appointed a Commander of the Royal Victorian Order (CVO) in 1901, and promoted to Knight Grand Cross (GCVO) in the Order in the 1911 Coronation Honours list.

He was a Fellow of the Society of Antiquaries of London (FSA).

== Death ==
McDonnell served as Chief Intelligence Officer for the London District from the outbreak of the First World War until early 1915 and was then sent to Flanders, as a Major in command of the 5th battalion Queen's Own Cameron Highlanders. He died of wounds sustained on 21 November on Ypres Salient on 23 November 1915.

He is buried in Lijssenthoek Military Cemetery in Belgium, grave reference II-A-7.

A memorial was erected in his memory in Dalness in Argyllshire to a design by Sir Robert Lorimer and Robert Matthew.

== Family ==
He was married in 1913, to Ethel Henry Davis, daughter of Major Alexander H. Davis.

Government offices
| Preceded by The Marquess of Granby | Principal Private Secretary to the Prime Minister; 1888–1892 | Succeeded by Algernon West |
| Preceded by Algernon West | Principal Private Secretary to the Prime Minister; 1895–1902 | Succeeded by John Satterfield Sandars |
