= Hugh McDonnell, 4th Earl of Antrim =

Anglo-Irish peer (1812–1855)

The Right Honourable The Earl of Antrim
- Born: Hugh Seymour Kerr; 7 August 1812; Portman Square, London, England
- Died: 19 July 1855 (aged 42); Glenarm Castle, Glenarm, County Antrim, Northern Ireland
- Spouse: Lady Laura Cecilia Parker (m. 1836; died 1855)
- Children: Lady Helen Laura Murray-Macgregor
- Parent(s): Lord Mark Robert Kerr; Charlotte Kerr, 3rd Countess of Antrim
- Relatives: William Kerr, 5th Marquess of Lothian (grandfather); Randal MacDonnell, 1st Marquess of Antrim (grandfather); Frances Vane, Marchioness of Londonderry (cousin)

Hugh Seymour McDonnell, 4th Earl of Antrim (né Kerr; 7 August 1812 – 19 July 1855), styled Viscount Dunluce from 1834 to 1845, was an Anglo-Irish peer of Irish and Scottish descent.

== Early life ==
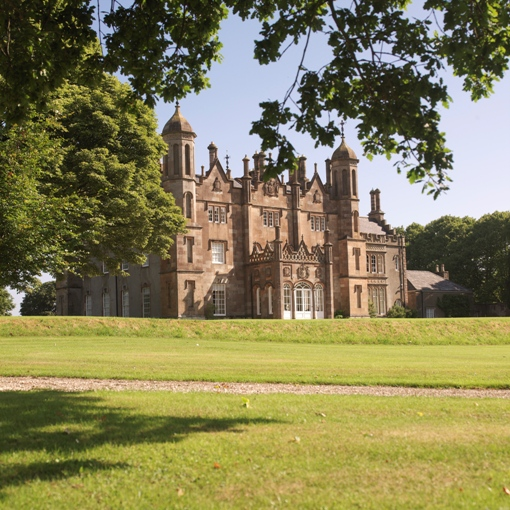
Glenarm Castle, the seat of the Earls of Antrim

Born Hugh Seymour Kerr on 7 August 1812 at Portman Square in London, he was the sixth, but eldest surviving, son of Vice-Admiral Lord Mark Kerr and Charlotte Kerr, 3rd Countess of Antrim.

Among his many siblings were Lady Georgina Anne Emily Kerr (who married the Rev. Hon. Frederic Bertie, son of the 4th Earl of Abingdon), Lady Caroline Mary Kerr (who married the Rev. Horace Robert Pechell, parents of Adm. Mark Robert Pechell), Lady Charlotte Kerr (who married Sir George Osborn, 6th Baronet), Lady Emily Frances Kerr (who married Henry Richardson and Sir Steuart Macnaghten, son of Sir Francis Workman-Macnaghten, 1st Baronet), Lady Letitia Louise Kerr (who married Cortlandt MacGregor Skinner), Charles Fortescue Kerr, styled Viscount Dunluce, Capt. Mark McDonnell (who married Jane Emma Hannah Macan, daughter of Maj. Turner Macan), and Lady Frederica Augusta Kerr (who married Montagu Bertie, 5th Earl of Abingdon).

His father was the third son of William Kerr, 5th Marquess of Lothian, and Elizabeth Fortescue (a daughter of Chichester Fortescue of Dromisken). His maternal grandparents were Randal MacDonnell, 1st Marquess of Antrim, and Hon. Letitia (née Morres) Trevor (widow of the Hon. Arthur Trevor and eldest daughter of 1st Viscount Mountmorres). His maternal aunt was Anne Catherine MacDonnell, 2nd Countess of Antrim (who married Sir Henry Vane-Tempest, 2nd Baronet, and Edmund Phelps), who succeeded her father's earldom while the marquessate became extinct upon his death in 1791. Through his aunt Anne, he was a first cousin of Frances Vane, Marchioness of Londonderry.

== Career ==
Upon the death of his mother on 26 October 1835 at Holmwood at Shiplake Row, near Henley, he succeeded as the 4th Viscount Dunluce and the 4th Earl of Antrim, both in the Peerage of Ireland, as his elder brother, Charles Fortescue Kerr, Viscount Dunluce, had died in 1834. On 27 June 1836, his name was legally changed to Hugh Seymour McDonnell by royal licence.

== Personal life ==
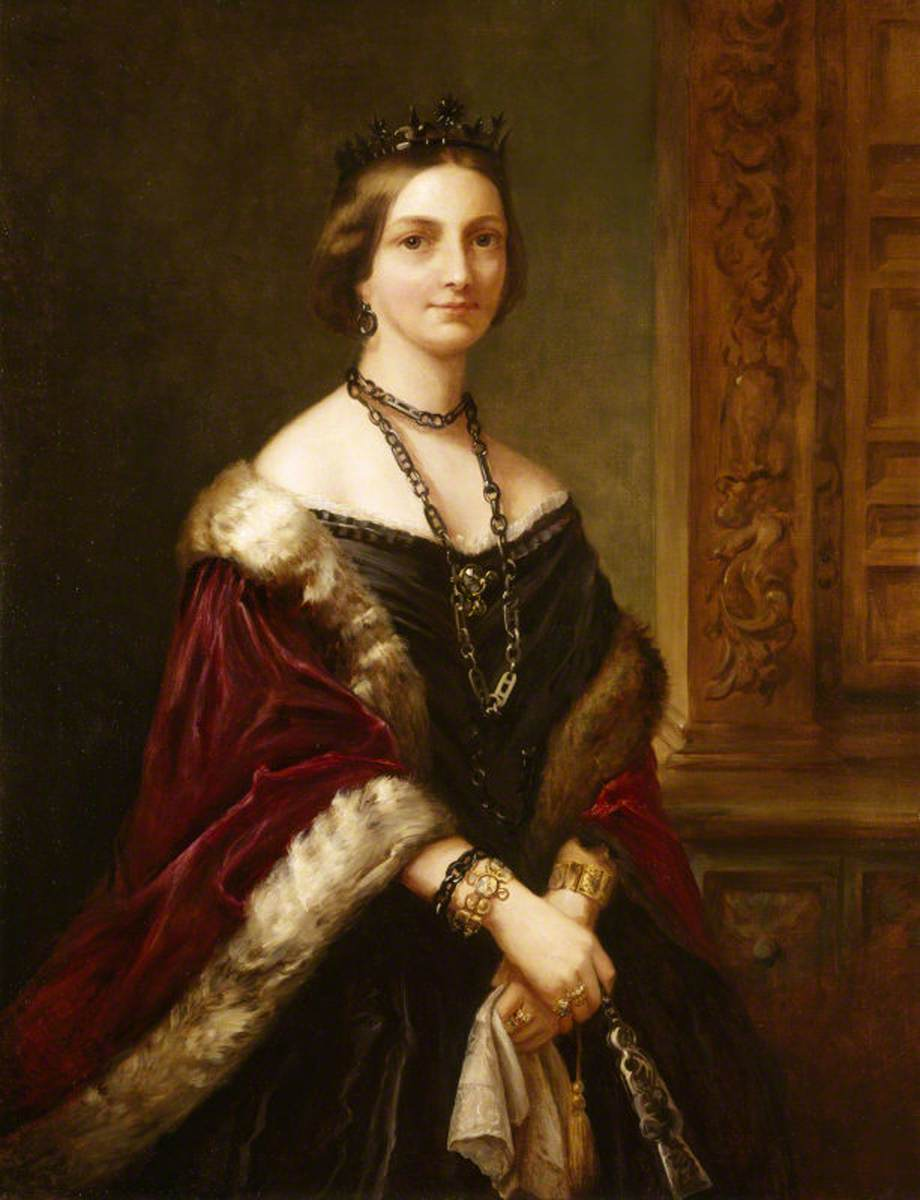
Portrait of his wife, Laura McDonnell, Countess of Antrim, between c. 1835 and c. 1845

On 3 May 1836 at St George's, Hanover Square, he married Lady Laura Cecilia Parker (1809–1883), daughter of Thomas Parker, 5th Earl of Macclesfield, and his second wife, Eliza Wolstenholme (the daughter of William Breton Wolstenholme). Together, they were the parents of:

- Lady Helen Laura McDonnell (1837–1922), who married Sir Malcolm Murray-MacGregor, 4th Baronet, son of Sir John Murray-Macgregor, 3rd Baronet, and the former Mary Charlotte Hardy (youngest daughter of Rear-Admiral Sir Thomas Hardy, 1st Baronet), in 1864.

Lord Antrim died at Glenarm Castle on 19 July 1855 and was buried at Bonamargy in County Antrim, Northern Ireland. As he died without male issue, the earldom passed to his younger brother, Mark McDonnell. His widow, the dowager Countess of Antrim, died at Beaufort Gardens, South Kensington, London, on 26 January 1883.

Peerage of Ireland
Preceded by Charlotte Kerr	Earl of Antrim; 1835–1855	Succeeded by Mark McDonnell
