= Sir Malcolm Murray-MacGregor, 4th Baronet =

Scottish baronet and senior Royal Navy officer

Rear-Admiral Sir Malcolm Murray-Macgregor of Macgregor, 4th Baronet, JP (29 August 1834 – 31 August 1879) was a Scottish baronet and senior Royal Navy officer.

== Early life ==
Born on 29 August 1834, Malcolm Murray-Macgregor was the eldest son of Sir John Atholl Bannatyne Murray-Macgregor, 3rd Baronet (1810–1851), and the former Mary Charlotte Hardy (d. 1896). Among his siblings was Sir Evan Macgregor, a civil servant who was Permanent Secretary to the Admiralty from 1884 to 1907. His father inherited the title and the chieftaincy of Clan Gregor in 1841.

His mother was the youngest daughter, of co-heiress, of Rear-Admiral Sir Thomas Masterman Hardy.

== Career ==
Murray-Macgregor succeeded to the baronetcy and the chieftaincy on his father's death on 11 May 1851; Sir John had arrived in the British Virgin Islands less two months earlier to take up his appointment as the colony's president. Meanwhile, Murray-Macgregor had embarked on a career in the Royal Navy; having joined the service in 1847, he was commissioned as a lieutenant in 1854 and served at Sebastopol (1854–55) during the Crimean War, receiving the Crimean Medal. He was promoted to commander in 1856 and took command of HMS Harrier in 1858. Four years later, he was promoted to captain. In 1869, he was awarded a medal by the Royal Humane Society for saving the life of a seaman who had been drowning off the West coast of Africa. In 1875, he was placed on the retired list and in 1878 was promoted to the rank of rear-admiral. He was not active politically, but held a number of offices in Perthshire, where he was a magistrate, a commissioner of supply and chairman of the School and Parochial Boards.

== Personal life ==
On 26 October 1864, Sir Malcom married Lady Helen Laura McDonnell, daughter of Hugh McDonnell, 4th Earl of Antrim and Lady Laura Parker (a daughter of the 5th Earl of Macclesfield). Together, they were the parents of five children:

- Malvina Charlotte Murray-Macgregor (1865–1924), who married Hon. Granville William Richard Somerset, son of Richard Somerset, 2nd Baron Raglan and Lady Georgiana Lygon (daughter of the 4th Earl Beauchamp), in 1892.
- Margaret Helen Mary Murray-Macgregor (1867–1933), who married Alan Murray, 6th Earl of Mansfield, son of William David Murray, Viscount Stormont and Emily Louisa Macgregor, in 1899.
- Sir Malcolm Murray-Macgregor, 5th Baronet (1873–1958), who was a Royal Navy officer who married Hon. Gylla Rollo, daughter of Hon. Eric Norman Rollo, in 1925.
- Mariel Alpina Murray-Macgregor (1875–1967), who married Ernest Pendleton Magruder, son of Caleb Clarke Magruder Jr. in 1911.
- Alexander Ronald Murray-Macgregor (1878–1960), who married Gertrude Blanche Murray, daughter of Charles Archibald Murray, in 1907.

A photograph of Murray-Macgregor by Camille Silvy (1860) is in the National Portrait Gallery's collections (NPG Ax50422).

Sir Malcom died on 31 August 1879 at Edinchip, aged 45; he had been in ill health for 18 months.

Baronetage of Great Britain
Preceded by John Murray-MacGregor	Baronet (of Lanrick); 1851–1879	Succeeded by Malcolm MacGregor
