= Sidney Parker =

Sidney Parker may refer to:

- Sid Parker (born 1930), Canadian politician
- Sidney Parker (anarchist) (born 1929), British anarchist
- Sidney Parker (rugby union) (1852–1897), English rugby international
