= MacGregor baronets =

Title in the Baronetage of Great Britain

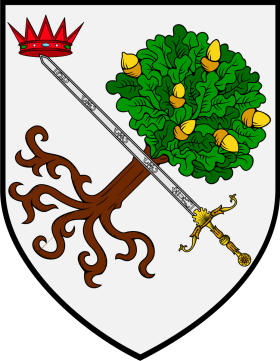
Arms of the MacGregors of MacGregor

The Murray, later MacGregor of MacGregor Baronetcy, of Lanrick in the County of Perth, is a title in the Baronetage of Great Britain. It was created on 3 July 1795 for John Murray, an army officer of the East India Company. He was a member of the Scottish MacGregor clan, and since his time the MacGregors of MacGregor have been the Chiefs of Clan Gregor.

The 2nd Baronet was a colonial administrator who served as Governor of Dominica, Antigua, Barbados and Trinidad. The 6th Baronet was a Brigadier in the Scots Guards.

== MacGregor name ==
This branch of the family had been forbidden to bear their own surname by James VI; the ban was revoked in 1661 by King Charles II but restored in 1693, during the reign of William and Mary. It was repealed in 1774. It was not, however, until 1822 that the family obtained a Royal licence to use the family surname.

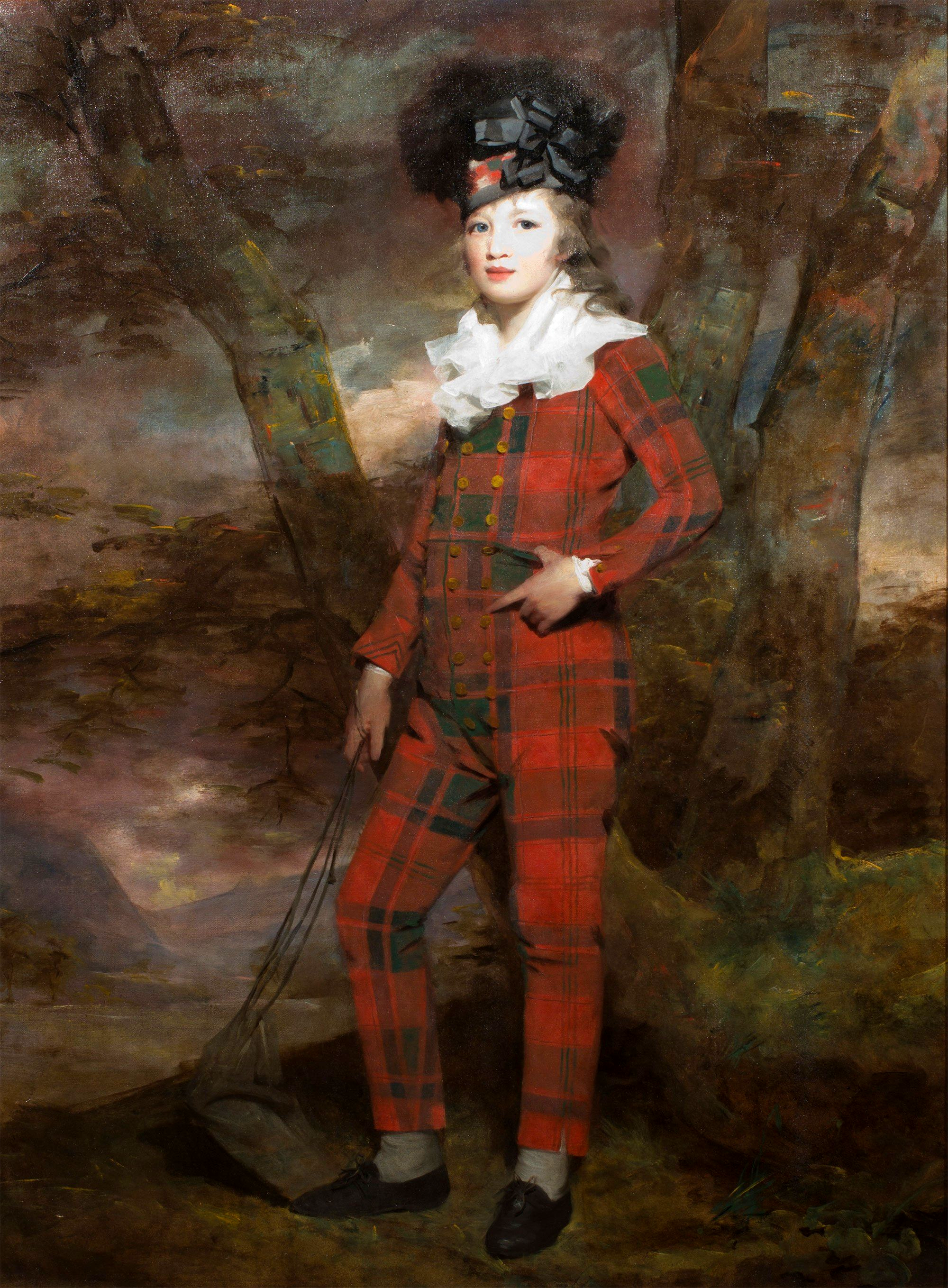
Sir Evan John Murray-MacGregor, 2nd Baronet (1785–1841), by Henry Raeburn

== Murray, later MacGregor of MacGregor baronets, of Lanrick (1795) ==
- Lieutenant-Colonel Sir John Murray, 1st Baronet (1745–1822), later Macgregor Murray.
- Major-General Sir Evan John Murray-MacGregor, 2nd Baronet (1785–1841), married 28 May 1808 Lady Elizabeth Murray (d. 1846), daughter of John Murray, 4th Duke of Atholl).
- Sir John Atholl Bannatyne Murray-MacGregor, 3rd Baronet (1810–1851), of Lanrick and Balquhidder.
- Rear-Admiral Sir Malcolm Murray-MacGregor, 4th Baronet (1834–1879)
- Captain Sir Malcolm MacGregor, 5th Baronet (1873–1958)
- Brigadier Sir Gregor MacGregor, 6th Baronet (1925–2003)
- Sir Malcolm Gregor Charles MacGregor, 7th Baronet (b. 1959)

The heir presumptive is his brother, Ninian Hubert Alexander MacGregor (b. 1961).

== Extended family ==
- Sir Evan MacGregor (1842–1926) was the third son of the 3rd Baronet.
- Alpin MacGregor (1846–1899), fourth son of the 3rd Baronet, was Gentleman Usher to Queen Victoria.

== Notes ==
Baronetage of Great Britain
Preceded by Wentworth baronets	Murray baronets of Lanrick; 3 July 1795	Succeeded by à Court baronets
