= Sir Gregor MacGregor, 6th Baronet =

British Army officer and Scottish clan chief (1925–2003)

Brigadier Sir Gregor MacGregor, 6th Baronet (22 December 1925 – 30 March 2003) was a British Army officer and Scottish clan chief. He succeeded his father, Malcolm MacGregor, 5th Baronet, and became the 23rd Chief of Clan Gregor from 1958 until his death. Having served as an officer of the Scots Guards, he was Defence and Military Attaché to Greece between 1975 and 1978.

== Early life ==
Born on 22 December 1925, MacGregor was educated at Eton College.

== Military career ==
On 22 September 1944, MacGregor received an emergency commission into the Scots Guards as a second lieutenant. His commission was confirmed on 14 February 1948 with seniority from 22 December 1946. Between 1947 and 1948 he fought in the Palestine Campaign. He was promoted to lieutenant on 14 February 1948, with seniority from 1 November 1947. He fought in the Malayan Emergency between 1950 and 1951. He was promoted to captain on 22 December 1952, and major on 22 December 1959.

In 1965 he took part in the Indonesian Confrontation in Borneo. He was promoted to lieutenant colonel on 14 April 1966 and was made commanding officer of the 1st Battalion, Scots Guards in 1966, a position he held until 1969. He was promoted to colonel on 30 June 1971. From 1971 to 1973 he served as Colonel of the Scots Guards, then later as Defence and Military Attaché to Athens between 1975 and 1978. He was promoted to brigadier on 31 December 1977, with seniority from 30 June 1977. He was appointed Aide de Camp to Queen Elizabeth II on 16 January 1979. He retired from military service on 22 December 1980.

== Personal life ==
MacGregor inherited the title of 6th Baronet MacGregor and the position of 23rd Chief of Clan Gregor upon the death of his father in 1958. He was admitted to the Royal Company of Archers. A Freemason for many years, between 1985 and 1993 he was Grand Master of the Grand Lodge of Scotland

On 8 February 1958, he married Fanny Butler and they had two children: Malcolm Gregor Charles MacGregor (b. 23 March 1959) and Ninian Hubert Alexander MacGregor (b. 30 June 1961). Lady MacGregor died on 10 August 2016. His oldest son married television journalist Lord Lieutenant of Dumfries Fiona Armstrong.

=== Cry Havoc incident ===
In 2011 the British mercenary and former Scots Guard and SAS officer, Simon Mann upset members of Clan Gregor and MacGregor's family after publishing his autobiography in which he describes MacGregor as a "small, toxic, red-haired, farting, foul-mouthed, stentorian dragon". The book, Cry Havoc, contains Mann's account of his unsuccessful mission to overthrow Teodoro Obiang Nguema Mbasogo, the President of Equatorial Guinea.

Masonic offices
Preceded by J. M. Marcus Humphrey	Grand Master of the Grand Lodge of Scotland; 1985–1993	Succeeded by The Lord Burton
Baronetage of Great Britain
Preceded by Malcolm MacGregor	Baronet (of Lanrick); 1958–2003	Succeeded by Malcolm MacGregor
