= Lord Mark Kerr (Royal Navy officer) =

Royal Navy admiral (1776–1840)

Vice-Admiral Lord Mark Kerr
- Born: Lord Mark Robert Kerr; 12 November 1776
- Died: 9 September 1840 (aged 63); Cavendish Square, London
- Spouse: Charlotte MacDonnell, 3rd Countess of Antrim (m. 1799)
- Parents: William John Kerr, 5th Marquess of Lothian (father); Elizabeth Fortescue (mother)
- Military career
- Children: 15, including Hugh and Mark
- Allegiance: United Kingdom
- Branch: Royal Navy
- Service years: c.1792–1840
- Rank: Vice-Admiral
- Commands: HMS Fortune; HMS San Ysidro; HMS Danae; HMS Bonne Citoyenne; HMS Cormorant; HMS Fisgard
- Conflicts: French Revolutionary War; Battle of Groix; Napoleonic Wars; Capture of Minorca

Vice-Admiral Lord Mark Robert Kerr (12 November 1776 – 9 September 1840) was an officer of the Royal Navy.

== Early life ==
Lord Mark Robert Kerr was born on 12 November 1776. He was the third son of William John Kerr, 5th Marquess of Lothian, by his wife, Elizabeth Fortescue. Among his siblings were William Kerr, 6th Marquess of Lothian, Lady Elizabeth Kerr (who married John Dormer, 10th Baron Dormer), Lady Mary Kerr (who married Gen. Hon. Frederick St John), and Lady Louisa Kerr (who married Arthur Atherley).

His paternal grandparents were William Kerr, 4th Marquess of Lothian and Lady Caroline D'Arcy (a daughter of the 3rd Earl of Holderness and a scion of the House of Schomberg). His maternal grandparents were Chichester Fortescue of Dromisken, who represented Trim in the Irish House of Commons, and the Hon. Elizabeth Colley Wesley (a daughter of 1st Baron Mornington and sister of the 1st Earl of Mornington). Among his maternal family was his uncle, Thomas Fortescue, MP for Trim, Admiral Chichester Fortescue, also MP for Trim, and Gerald Fortescue, who served as Ulster King of Arms.

== Career ==
Kerr served as a midshipman on HMS Lion, Captain Sir Erasmus Gower with Lord Macartney in his visit to China in 1792–1794, where he was commissioned as a lieutenant by Gower. He was present at the capture of Minorca in 1798. Captain Kerr was appointed to HMS Fisgard in September 1804, and a month later he captured several Spanish ships worth more than £14,000. On 2 November 1804, Horatio Nelson, himself quite ill, wrote to Lord Melville: '...I fear Lord M Kerr is falling into the same complaint [as I have]. I have now got him to the fleet and shall keep an Eye upon him for he is too valuable an Officer and good a Man to be lost for want of care.' In April 1805, Captain Mark Kerr discovered that the French Toulon fleet, sought by Nelson, were in the Atlantic and he passed this information on to Vice-Admiral John Orde, who relayed the message to England.

== Personal life ==
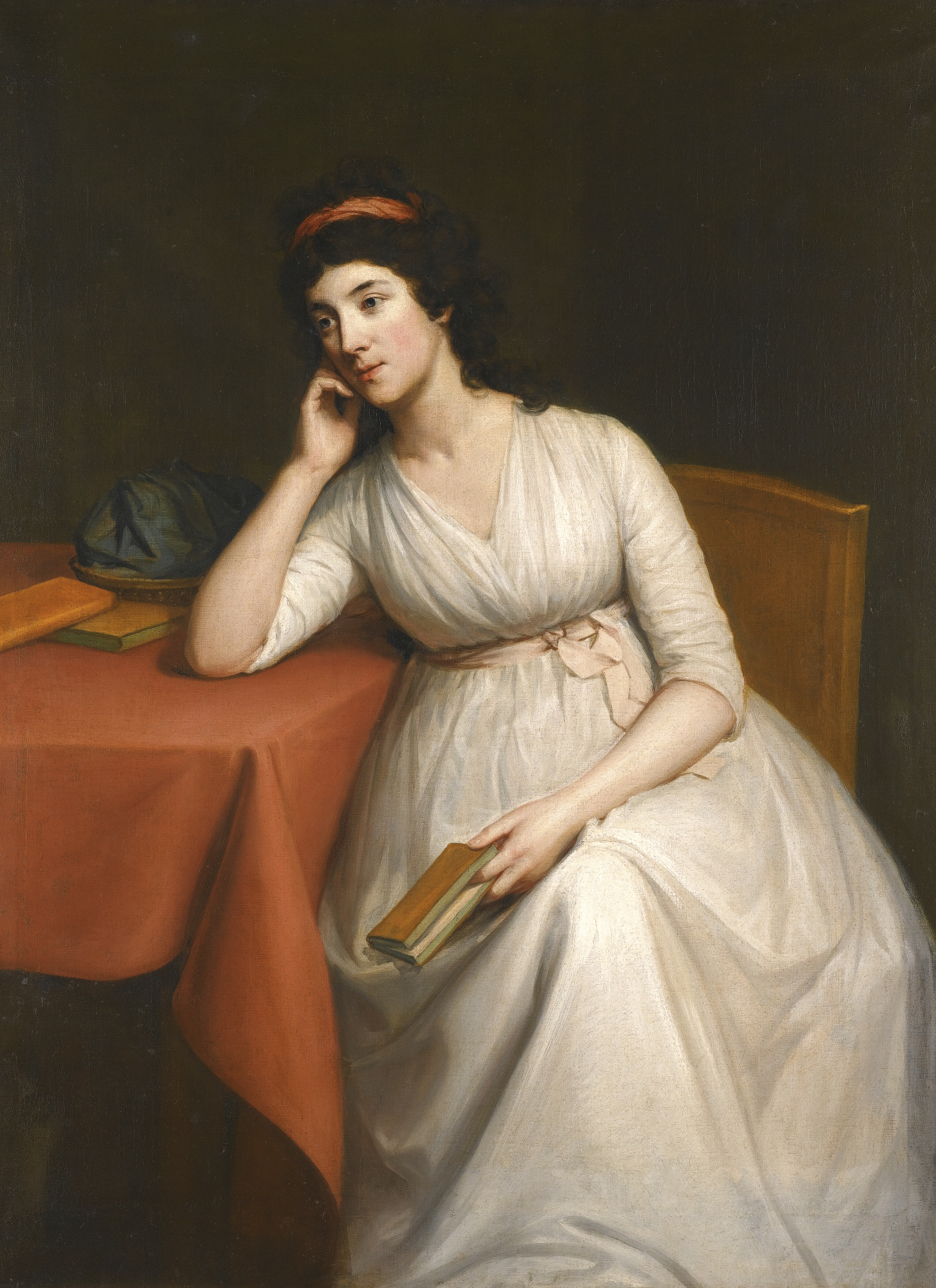
Portrait of a Lady (likely his wife, Charlotte MacDonnell, 3rd Countess of Antrim), by Hugh Douglas Hamilton, 1790s

On 18 July 1799, Lord Mark Robert Kerr married Lady Charlotte MacDonnell (1778–1835), third daughter of Randal Macdonnell, 6th Earl and 1st Marquess of Antrim; she succeeded him as Countess of Antrim (creation of 1785) suo jure (in her own right) on the death of her elder sister. They had a large family, fifteen children in total, of which their surviving children included:

- Lady Letitia Louisa Kerr (1800–1885), who married, as his second wife, Capt. Cortlandt George MacGregor Skinner of Carisbrooke House, Isle of Wight, a grandson of Gen. Cortlandt Skinner, in 1871.
- Lady Georgina Anne Emily Kerr (1807–1881), who married the Rev. Hon. Frederic Bertie, son of the Willoughby Bertie, 4th Earl of Abingdon, and Charlotte Anne Emily Warren (a daughter of Vice-Admiral Sir Peter Warren), in 1825.
- Lady Caroline Mary Kerr (1807–1869), who married the Rev. Horace Robert Pechell, son of Augustus Pechell (a son of Sir Paul Pechell, 1st Baronet) and Sarah Drake (a daughter of Rev. Thomas Drake), in 1826.
- Charles Fortescue Kerr (1810–1834), styled Viscount Dunluce, who died unmarried at Holmwood.
- Lady Charlotte Kerr (1811–1866), who married Sir George Osborn, 6th Baronet, son of Sir John Osborn, 5th Baronet, and Augusta Frederica Louisa Valentina Davers (the illegitimate daughter of Sir Charles Davers, 6th Baronet), in 1835.
- Hugh Seymour McDonnell, 4th Earl of Antrim (1812–1855), who married Lady Laura Cecilia Parker, a daughter of Thomas Parker, 5th Earl of Macclesfield, and his second wife, Eliza Wolstenholme (the daughter of William Breton Wolstenholme), in 1836.
- Mark McDonnell, 5th Earl of Antrim (1814–1869), a Captain who married Jane Emma Hannah Macan, daughter of Maj. Turner Macan and Harriet Sneyd (a daughter of Rev. Wettenhall Sneyd), in 1849.
- Lady Frederica Augusta Kerr (c. 1816–1864), who married Montagu Bertie, 5th Earl of Abingdon, son of Willoughby Bertie, 4th Earl of Abingdon, and Charlotte Anne Emily Warren (a daughter of Vice-Admiral Sir Peter Warren), in 1841.
- Lady Emily Frances Kerr (1818–1874), who married Henry Richardson, of Somerset, County Londonderry, in 1839. After his death in 1849, she married barrister Sir Steuart Macnaghten, son of Sir Francis Workman-Macnaghten, 1st Baronet, and Letitia Dunkin (a daughter of Sir William Dunkin), in 1864.
- Hon. Arthur Schomberg Kerr (1820–1850), who married Agnes Steuart Frankland, daughter of J. H. Frankland, of Eashing Park, Godalming, Surrey, in 1846.

Upon the death of his wife in 1835, their eldest surviving son, Hugh, succeeded to his mother's earldom as the 4th Earl of Antrim. Lord Mark Kerr died on 9 September 1840 at his residence in Henrietta Street, Cavendish Square, London.

=== Descendants ===
Through his daughter Lady Caroline, he was a grandfather of Admiral Mark Robert Pechell.
