= Thomas Parker, 3rd Earl of Macclesfield =

British peer and politician

Arms of Parker, Earls of Macclesfield: Gules, a chevron between three leopard's faces or

Thomas Parker, 3rd Earl of Macclesfield FRS (12 October 1723 – 9 February 1795), styled Viscount Parker between 1732 and 1764, was a British peer and politician.

== Early life ==
Macclesfield was the son of George Parker, 2nd Earl of Macclesfield, and Mary, daughter of Ralph Lane.

== Political career ==
Macclesfield was returned to Parliament for Newcastle-under-Lyme in 1747, a seat he held until 1754, and then represented Oxfordshire between 1754 and 1761 and Rochester between 1761 and 1764. The latter year he succeeded his father in the earldom and entered the House of Lords. The family seat was Shirburn Castle in Oxfordshire.

He was elected a Fellow of the Royal Society in November 1747.

== Family ==
Lord Macclesfield married his first cousin, Mary, daughter of Sir William Heathcote, 1st Baronet, and Elizabeth Parker, in 1749. They had four children:

- Lady Elizabeth Parker (29 June 1751 – 10 June 1829), who married John Fane, son of Henry Fane MP and Charlotte Luther. They had six children.
- Lady Mary Parker (b. 16 March 1753).
- George Parker, 4th Earl of Macclesfield (1755–1842).
- Thomas Parker, 5th Earl of Macclesfield (1763–1850), who married firstly a daughter of Lewis Edwards and had four daughters of which one, Amelia, married William Montgomery, grandson of Bernard Ward, 1st Viscount Bangor. He married secondly Eliza Wolstenholme, daughter of William Breton Wolstenholme, and with her had a son Thomas (later succeeding him as Earl), and two daughters Lavinia who married the Hon. John Dutton, son of John Dutton, 2nd Baron Sherborne and Laura who married Hugh Seymour McDonnell, 4th Earl of Antrim.

He died in February 1795, aged 71, and was succeeded in the earldom by his eldest son, George. Lady Macclesfield died in May 1812.

Parliament of Great Britain
Preceded by Hon. Baptist Leveson-Gower; Randle Wilbraham	Member of Parliament for Newcastle-under-Lyme; 1747–1754; With: Hon. Baptist Leveson-Gower	Succeeded by Hon. Baptist Leveson-Gower; Hon. John Waldegrave
Preceded by Sir James Dashwood, Bt; Norreys Bertie	Member of Parliament for Oxfordshire; 1754–1761; With: Sir Edward Turner, Bt	Succeeded by Lord Charles Spencer; Sir James Dashwood, Bt
Preceded by Nicholas Haddock; Isaac Townsend	Member of Parliament for Rochester; 1761–1764; With: Isaac Townsend	Succeeded by Isaac Townsend; Sir Charles Hardy
Peerage of Great Britain
Preceded by George Parker	Earl of Macclesfield; 1764–1795	Succeeded by George Parker
