= Evan Murray-Macgregor =

Scottish colonial administrator and senior British army officer

Major-General Sir Evan Murray-Macgregor Bt KCB KCH
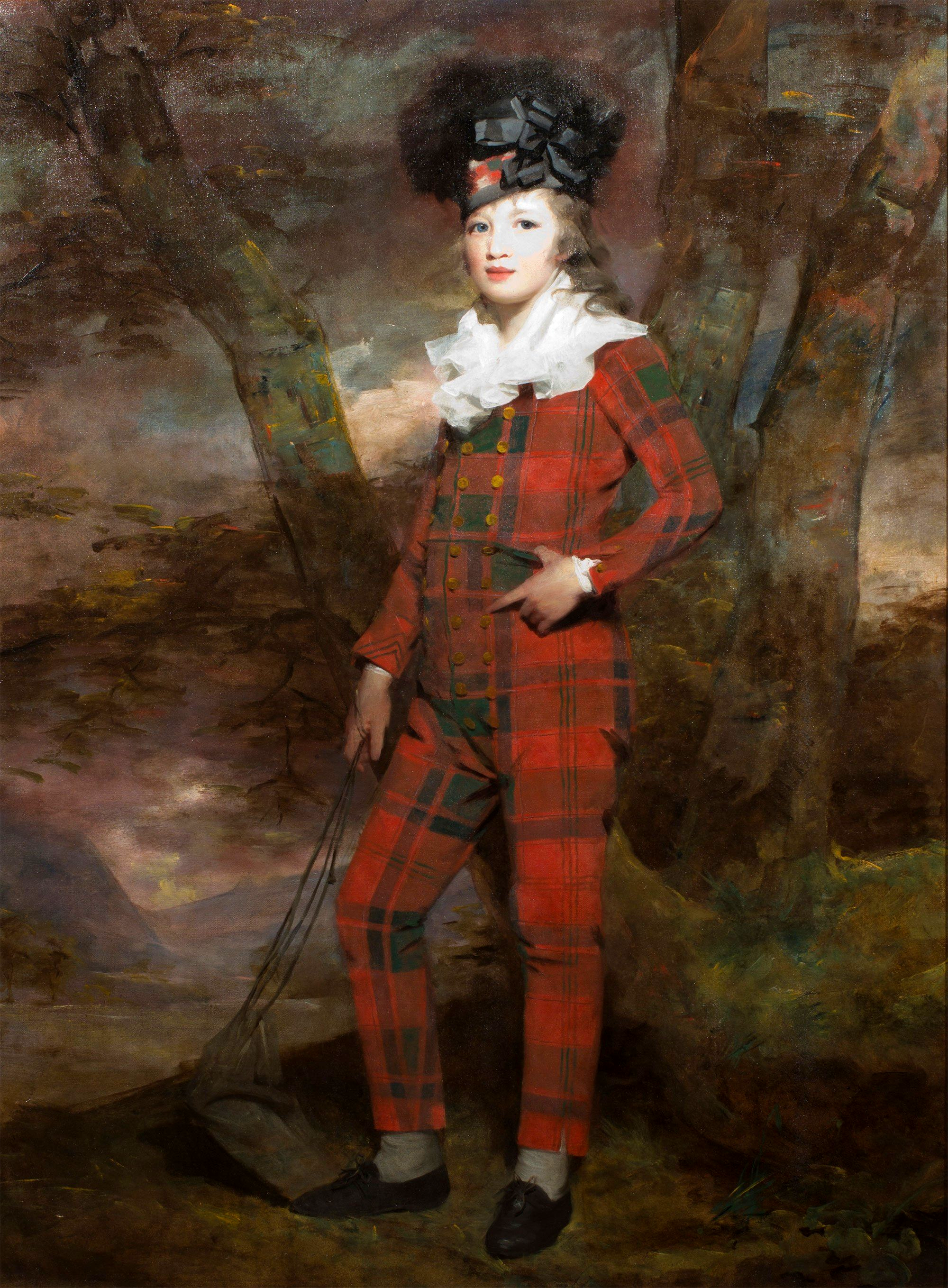
- Portrait by Sir Henry Raeburn, 1797–1799
- Born: Evan John Murray; 1785
- Died: 14 June 1841 (aged 55–56); Barbados

Major-General Sir Evan John Murray-Macgregor of Macgregor, 2nd Baronet, KCB, KCH (born Murray; 1785 – 14 June 1841) was a Scottish colonial administrator and senior British Army officer.

Murray's father was a baronet and chief of Clan Gregor; the family had a military tradition, which Murray followed, serving in the British Army from 1801. He fought in the Peninsular War (1808–11) and, after arriving in India in 1811, the Third Anglo-Maratha War (1817–18); he was severely injured while serving in the latter. By that time a lieutenant-colonel, he returned to England in 1820, inherited his father's baronetcy and chieftaincy two years later (adding Macgregor to his surname) and was appointed an aide-de-camp to the king in 1825.

In 1831, he was appointed Governor of Dominica and the following year became Governor of Antigua and the Leeward Islands, during which time he implemented the abolition of slavery on the island (1834); unusually, he was able to do this without using the optional transitional and highly restrictive apprenticeship system on the islands. The relative peace which followed immediate emancipation convinced him that this could be achieved elsewhere. He became Governor of Barbados and the Windward Islands in 1836, and worked to bring about the early end of the apprenticeship system which had been implemented on the islands in 1834; although he achieved that result in 1838, the British also passed an Act of Parliament overruling the local legislature to the same effect and Murray-Macgregor was accused of duplicity by some of the island's planters, who refused his request to bring their own termination date earlier still. Murray-Macgregor proclaimed early termination, effective on 1 August 1838. In the aftermath, he also had restrictive employment contract laws overruled. Although controversial and blamed for deteriorating legislative–executive relations, he has also been regarded as conciliatory and tactful in his approach to governing, with his administration overseeing liberal reforms. Having suffered from ill health for some time, Murray-Macgregor died in office in 1841.

== Early life and family ==
Evan John Murray was born either in January 1785 or on 2 June 1785, the only child of Captain John Murray (1745–1822), an officer in the Bengal Army, and his wife Anne, daughter of Roderick Macleod, WS, of Edinburgh. In 1787, his father inherited the chieftaincy of Clan Gregor (or Macgregor) and in 1795 was created a baronet.

On 28 May 1808, Murray married Lady Elizabeth Murray (1787–1846), daughter of John Murray, 4th Duke of Atholl, and had five sons who lived to adulthood: (Note: Another son, Roderick Dhu Alexander, died young.)

- John Atholl Bannatyne Murray-Macgregor (1810–1851), who would inherit the baronetcy and serve as President of the British Virgin Islands.
- Evan John William Murray-Macgregor (1819–1850), an officer in the Austrian military.
- James Strathallan Murray-Macgregor (1821–1843), who died in Dominica.
- Lieutenant Francis Alexander Robert Murray Macgregor (1823–1857), an officer in the Indian Army who was killed by members of his regiment in Jubbulpore during the Indian Mutiny.
- Lieutenant-Colonel Ernest Augustus Murray Macgregor (1825–1869), an officer in the 9th Light Cavalry in the East India Company's Army and a Groom in Waiting to the Queen (1869).

And three daughters: Jane Anne Maria (married John James Hamilton Burgoyne, son of Sir John James Burgoyne), Elizabeth Mary Anne (died 1857; married to Joseph Blake of London) and Amelia Georgiana. (Note: Another daughter, Louisa Isabella, died in 1830.)

== Military career ==
A number of Murray's relatives had military careers; his father was military auditor general of Bengal between 1789 and 1796, and several uncles and cousins were also officers in the East India Company's Bengal army. Murray purchased a commission as an ensign in the 81st Regiment of Foot in the British Army in 1801, then bought a commission as a lieutenant in the 9th Regiment of Foot the following year, and was transferred to the 15th Dragoons with the rank in 1803. The following year, he became captain of a troop (by purchase) in the same regiment.

Murray fought with the Cavalry in the Corunna campaign of 1808–09 during the Peninsular War, serving under Lord Paget (who later became the Marquis of Anglesey); he was present at the Battle of Sahagún in December 1808. In 1810, he exchanged his commission and transferred to the 52nd Foot; he then travelled to Cádiz on Lord Lynedoch's staff. Murray was promoted to major in the 103rd Foot in April 1810 and appointed Assistant Adjutant-General in Spain and Portugal. He was present during the Siege of Cádiz.

In June 1811, Murray exchanged into the 8th Light Dragoons and went to the East Indies, arriving in October that year. He was appointed deputy quartermaster-general in January 1812 with the rank of lieutenant-colonel. He transferred back to the 8th Light Dragoons three years later. In June 1816, he was appointed deputy adjutant-general and served in the Deccan under Sir Thomas Hislop in the Third Anglo-Maratha War. An obituary in the United Service Journal records that he "distinguished himself" at the Battle of Mahidpur (December 1817) by leading the attack on the batteries under Maharaja Malhar Rao Holkar II's command. After Holkar's forces were defeated in the battle, most of his border fortresses surrendered. The last holdout was the fort at Talnar (or Talnier). There, the following February, Murray joined Hislop's forces in storming the fort. Although the attack was successful (though controversial for Hislop slaughtered the remnants of the Maratha garrison after it had surrendered), Murray was severely wounded (sustaining seven dagger wounds); he was left unable to use his right arm. Murray's stand, surrounded by enemies, was captured in a watercolour by William Heath, which is now housed in the British Museum's collections. He was appointed a Companion of the Order of the Bath (CB) in October 1818 but was forced to return to England in July 1820 because of his injuries.

Murray inherited the baronetcy on his father's death in June 1822; he also became chief of Clan Gregor and in December 1822 received a Royal Licence to take the surname Murray-Macgregor. He was also made a Knight of the Royal Guelphic Order (KH) in 1822. In May 1825, Murray-Macgregor was appointed an aide-de-camp to the king (with the rank of colonel) and travelled with him to Lisbon two years later. In 1831, he participated in the coronation procession of William IV in his capacity as an aide-de-camp, and was appointed a Knight Commander of the Royal Guelphic Order (KCH). In 1837 was promoted to the rank of major-general.

== Colonial governor ==
=== Dominica (1831–32) and Antigua and the Leeward Islands (1832–36) ===
On 25 July 1831, Murray-Macgregor was appointed Governor of Dominica. On 19 December 1832, he was made Governor of Antigua, Montserrat and Barbuda, St Christopher, Nevis, Anguilla and the Virgin Islands, and Dominica, administered together as the British Leeward Islands. Murray-Macgregor's gubernatorial appointments coincided with the passage of the Slavery Abolition Act in the British Parliament in 1833 and the abolition of slavery in the British West Indies. While abolishing slavery in all British colonies, the 1833 Act allowed for slaves to remain as apprentices of their former masters for a period of four to six years as part of a transition period. Murray-Macgregor implemented laws abolishing slavery and, uniquely, foregoing apprenticeships in the Leeward Islands in 1834, granting freedom to all former slaves immediately. He believed the process to have been peaceful and successful. This likely convinced him that swift moves towards full emancipation were both possible and beneficial elsewhere. Murray-Macgregor also appointed two non-white justices of the peace in Antigua.

=== Barbados and the Windward Islands (1836–41) ===
==== Abolition of apprenticeships ====
Murray-Macgregor left the Leeward Islands and was appointed Governor of Barbados, Saint Vincent, Grenada and Tobago (the British Windward Islands) in October 1836. By the time he took office in Barbados, the colony's planters were embittered following the 1833 Act, poor relations with Murray-Macgregor's predecessor Sir Lionel Smith, and the British government's decision to amalgamate the governorship of the island with that of the other Windward Islands in 1833. When the Abolition of Slavery Act came into force in 1834, the islands opted to impose the apprenticeship scheme on former slaves. Criticism of the system grew from abolitionists in Britain, who argued that former slaves fared little better as apprentices; pressure mounted on the British government to end the system early. In late 1837, the Colonial Office encouraged governors to persuade local legislatures to terminate the apprenticeship system early.

In January 1838, Macgregor formally recommended to the Parliament of Barbados that it abolish apprenticeships, but in the following months the planters (who made up most of its membership) made clear their opposition to the notion. They resented what they saw as another attempt to weaken their position economically and impose laws on them. In March and April, the British Parliament began debating legislation which would force an end to the apprenticeships (the Bill to Amend the Abolition of Slavery Act); Macgregor therefore encouraged the Barbadian planters to realise that they faced a choice: free the apprentices on their own terms, or be compelled on the terms of the British government. He worked with others, notably Robert Bowcher Clarke, to champion early termination. He had to give some concessions to planters, mainly over the right of apprentices to retain their tied tenures after termination, and the Bill passed on 15 May in Barbados; equivalent Bills were passed in all but the Saint Lucian assemblies within the month. The assemblies voted to abolish the apprenticeship scheme effective in August 1838, creating a system of free labour. This applied pressure on planters in other colonies, such as Jamaica, to do the same.

In late May the British Parliament passed their Bill; this made early termination effective from 1 August unless the assemblies were to bring forward emancipation earlier still. When the Act arrived at Barbados, many on the island were deeply unhappy with the move (and felt that Macgregor had deceived them), seeing it as an imposition on the part of the British government. Macgregor tried to convince the planters to bring forward the commencement of their own Bills. They refused, arguing that to do so would signal to the British that the islanders could be coerced into supporting anything coming out of the Colonial Office: they could "be brought into a dog-like fidelity ... the more they were kicked and spurned". They therefore voted down a move to bring the date for early termination before August.

On 2 July, Murray-Macgregor proclaimed emancipation for apprentices in Barbados effective from 1 August. Saint Lucia's legislature still had not passed an Act to the same effect and so he arrived on the island on 13 July 1838 with a 100 infantrymen and convinced the planters to pass the Bill three days later. On 19 July, he was appointed a Knight Commander of the Order of the Bath (KCB). The historian Hilary Beckles states that the end of the apprenticeship system occurred peacefully, although there were reports of rioting in Saint Andrew in July, some freed labourers refusing to work in August, cane fires being started in late 1839 and early 1840, and strikes in 1840, all of which prompted the legislature to pass laws appointing special constables to assist the police forces in 1840.

==== "Contract Laws" of 1838 and 1840 ====
With the end of the apprenticeships, the Barbadian legislature passed the Masters and Servant Act 1838, which became known as the Contract Law. It stipulated that a worker who was employed for five days a week was assumed to be employed on a one-year contract, which could be ended by either party with one month's notice. It placed workers at a disadvantage, allowing employers to evict them from tied tenancies and punish them for misbehaviour (imposing jail terms for using foul language). Employers were also allowed to employ private police on their estate. Murray-Macgregor disliked the law, feeling it unfair on workers; he convinced the Colonial Office in October 1838 to overrule it and another vagrancy law which was being abused by planters. Workers were also critical of their low wages and he encouraged them to negotiate with their employers. In 1840, a "mildly modified" form of the 1838 Act was passed, which allowed for contracts of one month instead of one year. Despite that, the Act "institutionalised discrimination against black and coloured workers".

== Death and legacy ==
Murray-Macgregor's health had been "for some time delicate", but his death in office at Barbados on 14 June 1841 was "unexpected", according to one contemporary. His funeral was paid for by public funds and attended by a large number of government officials, army and navy officers and "gentlemen" from across the colony. He was succeeded in the baronetcy by his son John.

Macgregor's role in the process of ending the apprenticeship scheme on Barbados was summarised by the historian Woodville K. Marshall: "the policy and actions of ... Sir Evan McGregor [sic], are of central importance. He, more than any other, was responsible for the early termination of the Apprenticeship in the Windward Islands". In Marshall's view, he was also responsible for the deteriorating relations between the executive and legislative branches on the island from May 1838, and was likely motivated by sympathy for abolitionists, but more still by belief in his own style of governing and a desire (as an "able and articulate" governor) to limit the British government's embarrassment over the apprenticeship system. The historian Hilary Beckles argues that Macgregor "did well to convince the legislature that they should abolish the system". Another historian, William A. Green, argues that: "MacGregor was neither formidable nor austere. His language was conciliatory ... His correspondence was uninspired, offering limited analysis of colonial affairs ... [but he] confronted none of the animus which Smith [his predecessor on Barbados] had encountered ... and his administration was distinguished by the production of liberal and remedial legislation".

== Likenesses ==
An oil-on-canvas portrait of a young Murray-Macgregor by Sir Henry Raeburn was completed around 1797–99; it was exhibited in 1939 at the Royal Academy and in 1956 at the National Gallery of Scotland. Ownership remained in the family until it was sold at Christie's in 2014 for £458,000. A print by Henry Dawe (after George Watson) of 1825 depicts Murray-Macgregor wearing tartan "In the Dress as He appeared at His Majesty's Levee Holyrood Palace, 1822". Published by Robert Scott, a copy was acquired in 1902 by the British Museum, where it remains (museum no. 1902,1011.610). The watercolour by William Heath depicting his stand at the storming of Fort Talnar is also housed in the British Museum's collection (no. 1937,0308.17).

Baronetage of Great Britain
Preceded by John Macgregor Murray	Baronet (of Lanrick); 1822–1841	Succeeded by John Murray-Macgregor
