= Wettenhall Sneyd =

18th-century Anglican priest in Ireland

Wettenhall Sneyd (1676–1745) was an 18th-century Anglican priest in Ireland.

The cousin of Edward Wettenhall, Bishop of Cork and Ross from 1679 to 1699, Sneyd was born in Burslem, Staffordshire, England and educated at Trinity College, Dublin. In 1710 he became the Vicar of Vicar of Killersherdiny and the Vicar general of the Diocese of Kilmore. He was Archdeacon of Kilmore from 1740 until his death.
