= Sidney Parker (rugby union) =

England international rugby union player

- Born: Sidney Parker; 3 October 1852 Shirburn Castle, Oxon
- Died: 21 May 1897 (aged 44) Chelsea, London
- Occupation: Tea plantation owner

Rugby union career
- Position: Forward
Senior career
| Years | Team | Apps | (Points) |
- Liverpool
International career
| Years | Team | Apps | (Points) |
| 1874–1875 | England | 2 | |
- Father: Thomas Parker, 6th Earl of Macclesfield

Sidney Parker (1852–1897) was a rugby union international who represented England from 1874 to 1875.

== Early life ==
The Honorable Sidney Parker was born on 3 October 1852 in Shirburn Castle, Oxfordshire, the fifth son and seventh child of fifteen children of Thomas Parker, 6th Earl of Macclesfield, and Lady Mary Frances Grosvenor (1821–1912), daughter of Richard Grosvenor, 2nd Marquess of Westminster, and sister of Hugh Grosvenor, 1st Duke of Westminster. By the age of eighteen he had moved to Liverpool and was working as a merchant's apprentice.

== Rugby union career ==
Parker played his club rugby for Liverpool. He made his winning international debut on 23 February 1874 at The Oval in the fourth meeting of England and Scotland. He again represented England against Scotland the following year in Edinburgh where the match was drawn.

== Later life ==
The Hon. Sidney Parker spent much of his time in India and became a Tea Planter in Assam. He owned tea plantations in Assam of over 1,590 statute acres, known as The Oaklands Tea Estate. Samples of tea from his estate were shown at the India and Ceylon exhibition at Earl's Court, London, in 1896 He died on 21 May 1897 at Hans-house, Hans Street, Middlesex.
