= Emancipation of the British West Indies =

1833 legal ban on slavery in United Kingdom's Caribbean possessions

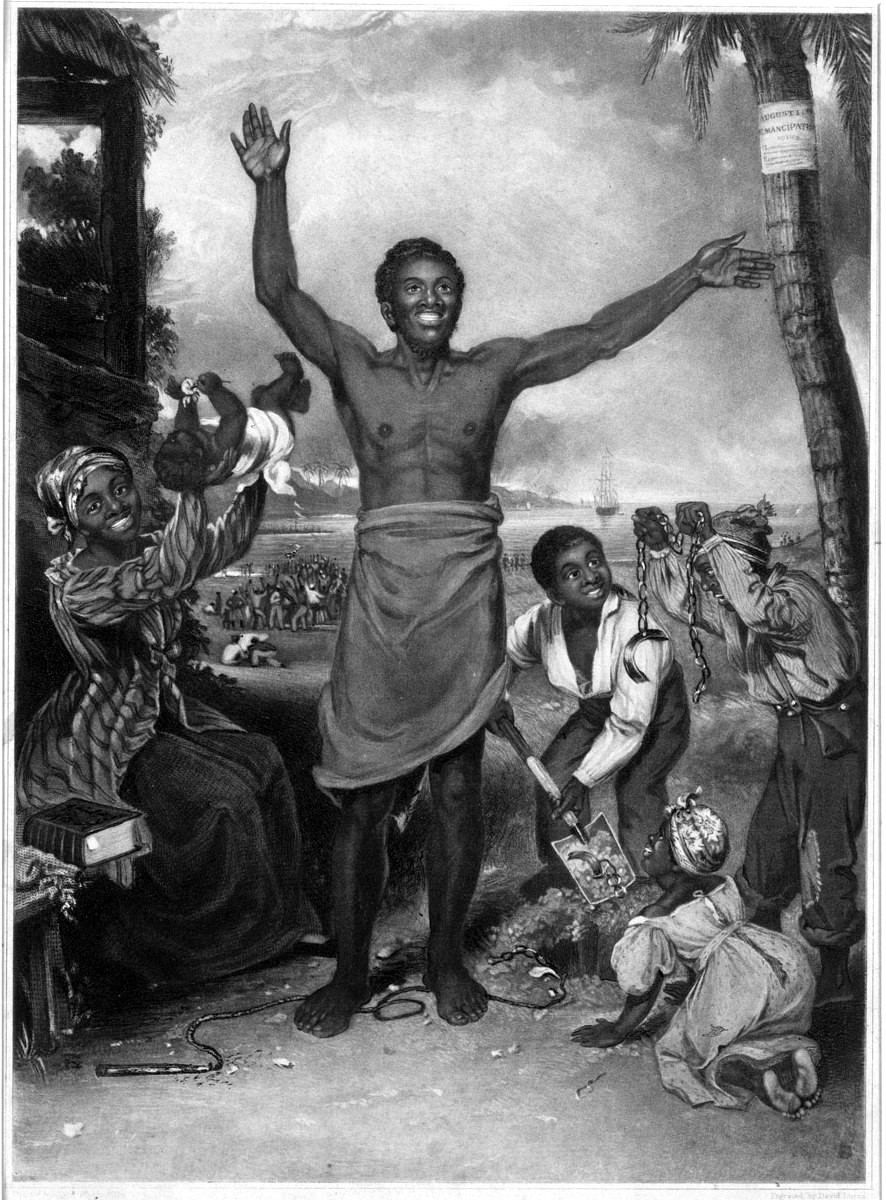
"To the Friends of Negro Emancipation", an engraving celebrating the abolition of slavery in the British Empire in 1833

The emancipation of the British West Indies refers to the abolition of slavery in Britain's colonies in the West Indies during the 1830s. The British government passed the Slavery Abolition Act 1833, which emancipated all enslaved people in the British West Indies. After emancipation, a system of apprenticeship was established, where emancipated Africans were required by the various colonial assemblies to continue working for their former masters for a period of four to six years in exchange for provisions. The system of apprenticeship was abolished by the various colonial assemblies in 1838, after pressure from the British public, completing the process of emancipation. These were the steps taken by British West Indian planters to solve the shortage of supply of exploited labourers created by the emancipation of the enslaved Africans in 1838.

== Anti-slavery movement and emancipation policy ==
Religious, economic, and social factors contributed to the British abolition of slavery throughout their empire. Throughout European colonies in the Caribbean, enslaved people engaged in revolts, labour stoppages and more everyday forms of resistance which enticed colonial authorities, who were eager to create peace and maintain economic stability in the colonies, to consider legislating abolition. The Haitian Revolution in the French colony of Saint-Domingue, the most successful slave uprising in the Americas, heightened British sensitivities to the potential outcomes of insurrection. In addition to slave revolts, Enlightenment schools of thought and evangelism led members of the British public to question the morality of slavery and the slave trade and during the 18th and 19th century there was a surge of abolitionist agitation. Religious figures played a prominent role in the crusade against slavery. Anti-slavery societies such as the British and Foreign Anti-Slavery Society (BFASS) circulated pamphlets about the cruelties and inhumanity of slavery, and petitions with hundreds of thousands of signatures were sent to the British Parliament, many of which came from women's organizations. Collectively, these men and women politicized slavery and placed pressure on the British government to abolish it. Developments in capitalism also contributed to emancipation. Some scholars, including Trinidadian historian Eric Williams, have claimed that with the emergence of capitalism, slavery was no longer profitable, and as such increased support for abolition beginning in the late 18th century.

British abolitionists saw partial success in their efforts when the government passed the Slave Trade Act 1807, abolishing the slave trade. After passage of the act, these reformers continued to press for the abolition of slavery itself. The British government formally abolished slavery in its colonies with passage of the Slavery Abolition Act 1833. The legislation went into effect in August 1834 whereby all enslaved people in the British Empire were considered free under British law. After long and heated debates in Britain, the government agreed to compensate West Indian planters for shifting from enslaved to free labour, allotting £20 million for this purpose. However, enslaved people were not compensated. In fact, the Abolition Act transformed the enslaved into "apprentices", except in the cases of Antigua and Bermuda where the colonial governments rejected apprenticeship and fully emancipated enslaved people in 1834.

== Apprenticeship ==
=== Policy and conditions ===
The Slavery Abolition Act 1833 established a system of indentured servitude or "apprenticeship" that required formerly enslaved people to continue to work for their former owners as apprentices. The gradual emancipation measure was implemented to ease the transition from slavery to freedom for enslaved people and former slave masters but it was in large part a result of concerns about emancipation's effect on West Indian sugar production. As stipulated in the emancipation act, field hands were apprenticed for a period of six years, household labourers were to work for four, and children under the age of six were immediately freed. All apprentices' names were to be placed on a registry that served as documentation of their required service.

Apprentices were required to work no more than 45 hours per week without compensation and were paid for any additional labour. Policy makers reasoned that the opportunity for some paid labour would teach enslaved people how to be industrious. In return for unpaid labour, formerly enslaved people received food, housing, clothing and medical treatment from their employers though the Act did not specify precise quantities. Apprentices were prohibited from working on Sundays. If financially able to pay the remaining years of their service, an apprentice could purchase his or her own freedom.

The British government designated Crown-appointed magistrates to oversee the newly implemented labour system and these officials were tasked with protecting the interests of free people of color. Fearful of the response that conditional emancipation might elicit from the formerly enslaved, the colonial authorities created police districts to maintain societal order. Within each district were houses of correction and workhouses that were operated and supervised by the chief magistrate and five justices of the peace who were frequently also planters who had enslaved people. Freedpeople could be sent to labour in workhouses for failure to work on the plantations or breaking other duties specified in the Abolition Act. Emancipation legislation banned planters' use of the whip and the state formally took on the responsibility for disciplining labourers. However, planters could use the remanding of apprentices to workhouses as a means of exercising control over the formerly enslaved.

The conditions within workhouses were grim and apprentices were subjected to hard labour and regular physical punishment. Treadmills were common features in these spaces and consisted of "wooden steps around a hollow cylinder on which a prisoner was made to step as the mechanism turned." The mechanism did not serve to produce any material good but the officials insisted that exhaustively running on the mechanism for several minutes reformed and disciplined prisoners. Widespread support for the use of treadmills also came from West Indian planters who were convinced that the formerly enslaved would not produce the same outputs if they were not adequately disciplined with corporal punishment. Photographs that depict the treadmills of the Jamaican workhouses illuminate that this punishment was not restricted to men. Women, who made up a majority of the field labour population in Jamaica and other colonies, were frequently sent to the workhouses and subjected to the treadmill.

=== Apprentice experiences and resistance ===
Once news of the Abolition Act made its way to the colonies, emancipated Africans rejoiced and celebrated their freedom. However, the realization that emancipation would be gradual had a sobering effect. The formerly enslaved protested the system of apprenticeship and demanded immediate, unqualified freedom. Because they had long laboured under slavery and performed the same tasks under apprenticeship, they denied the need for a transitional, supervised labour system. Freed people were eager to restructure their lives and devote time to family. They also sought to choose their own work hours, employers, and the type of labour they performed. Many apprentices across the West Indies refused to return to work and went on strike. For their failure to work, many were arrested, flogged under judicial authority, and sent to prison.

Circumstances under apprenticeship were far from ideal for all labourers, but women often faced particular challenges. In the years leading up to emancipation, former masters offered incentives to pregnant women and new mothers for bearing children, because by law, women's offspring became the property of the master, thereby producing more wealth for their owner. Under apprenticeship, however, planters were no longer afforded access to women's children and consequently employers ceased to offer women "indulgences". Women were now expected to work while pregnant and with small children, though other emancipated Africans demanded that these women be exempt from arduous field labour.

In some cases, apprentices' protests were effective for producing reforms to the apprenticeship system. In Trinidad, apprentices were granted a five-day work week, masters became required to care for freed children, and workers were compensated for labour performed on a Saturday.

A small number of apprentices attempted to purchase their freedom with some managing to successfully do so. Apprentices were appraised in the local courts and high prices hampered enslaved people's ability to free themselves, given their lack of access to material wealth, which was being systematically withheld from them. However, planters' awareness that apprenticeship's abolition was on the horizon led some to settle on a lower price for manumission outside of the courts. This ensured that planters saw some financial gain. They also hoped that such negotiations would encourage apprentices to continue labouring once freed.

=== James Williams' A Narrative of Events and the anti-apprenticeship campaign ===
A Narrative of Events, since the First of August, 1834, by James Williams, an Apprenticed Labourer in Jamaica is one of the few published first person accounts by a formerly enslaved person. It was published in a pamphlet in 1837 and was sold, reprinted and circulated across Britain and Jamaica. The narrative played a critical role in the anti-apprenticeship campaign launched by Joseph Sturge and other members of Britain's Central Emancipation Committee. The abolitionists were steadfast in their belief that apprenticeship was merely a continuation of slavery. In 1836, Sturge traveled to Jamaica to gather first hand information about the labour system. While there, he and other anti-apprenticeship activists met James Williams, an apprentice from St. Ann's Parish that worked on the Penshurst Plantation for the Senior family, who shared his experience with the abolitionists. Sturge organized to have his narrative recorded by an amanuensis and published it in hopes of informing the British public about Caribbean labour conditions and gaining widespread support for immediate abolition.

The narrative vividly captures James Williams' experiences under the system of apprenticeship in Jamaica. The physical violence meted out apprentices and sexual abuse they faced are central to Williams' narrative. Throughout and in great detail, Williams explains how he was treated unfairly by his master and workhouse prisoners were tied to the treadmills, forced to "dance" on the machine after long days of labour and severely flogged. The disruptive effects of forced labour on the families of freed Africans, colonial officials' inability to effectively regulate the labour system, and the apprentices' poor living and working conditions are issues that Williams also discusses. The narrative does not include any information about James Williams' early life and focuses solely on his time as an apprentice. Its narrow focus and centring of violence is likely a result of the narrative's political purpose and intended British audience and may suggest that abolitionists and the amanuensis who worked with Williams influenced what themes and details were included. Yet, despite the emphasis on violence, Williams describes how he attempted to resist exploitation through truancy, theft and appealing to magistrates for protection against his masters' abuses.

Narrative of Events was popular, widely circulated and positively received by the British public. However, it also produced a considerable backlash in the West Indies. The Jamaica Despatch, a pro-planter Jamaican newspaper, criticized James Williams and Joseph Sturge and insisted that the narrative was propaganda and its claims unfounded. In response, anti-apprenticeship proponents published select apprentice interviews in the local newspapers to bolster Williams' claims. Historian of the Caribbean Diana Patton has suggested that the extent of planter resistance indicates the political efficacy of the narrative.

Williams' narrative was particularly helpful in the anti-apprenticeship campaign because it includes specific names and places which made his claims verifiable. As a result, In 1837, after receiving and reviewing the publication, the Colonial Office tasked Sir Lionel Smith, the governor of Jamaica, to investigate the allegations made in Williams' narrative and to establish a commission to interview the apprentices, magistrates, and workhouse overseers in St. Ann's and other Jamaican parishes. The commission consisted of Sir Special Magistrate Daughtrey and local justice Gordon. It commenced its investigation on 20 September 1837. The Gordon & Daughtrey Commission corroborated many of Williams' claims though there were some discrepancies. Their findings were printed in a special report and in the 1837–1838 Parliamentary Papers.

=== Abolition of apprenticeship ===
Narrative of Events, other damaging accounts and investigations of the West Indian workhouses, local fears of rebellion and pressure from the British public led the colonial assemblies to prematurely abolish the apprenticeship system and all had done so by 1838.

== Full emancipation ==
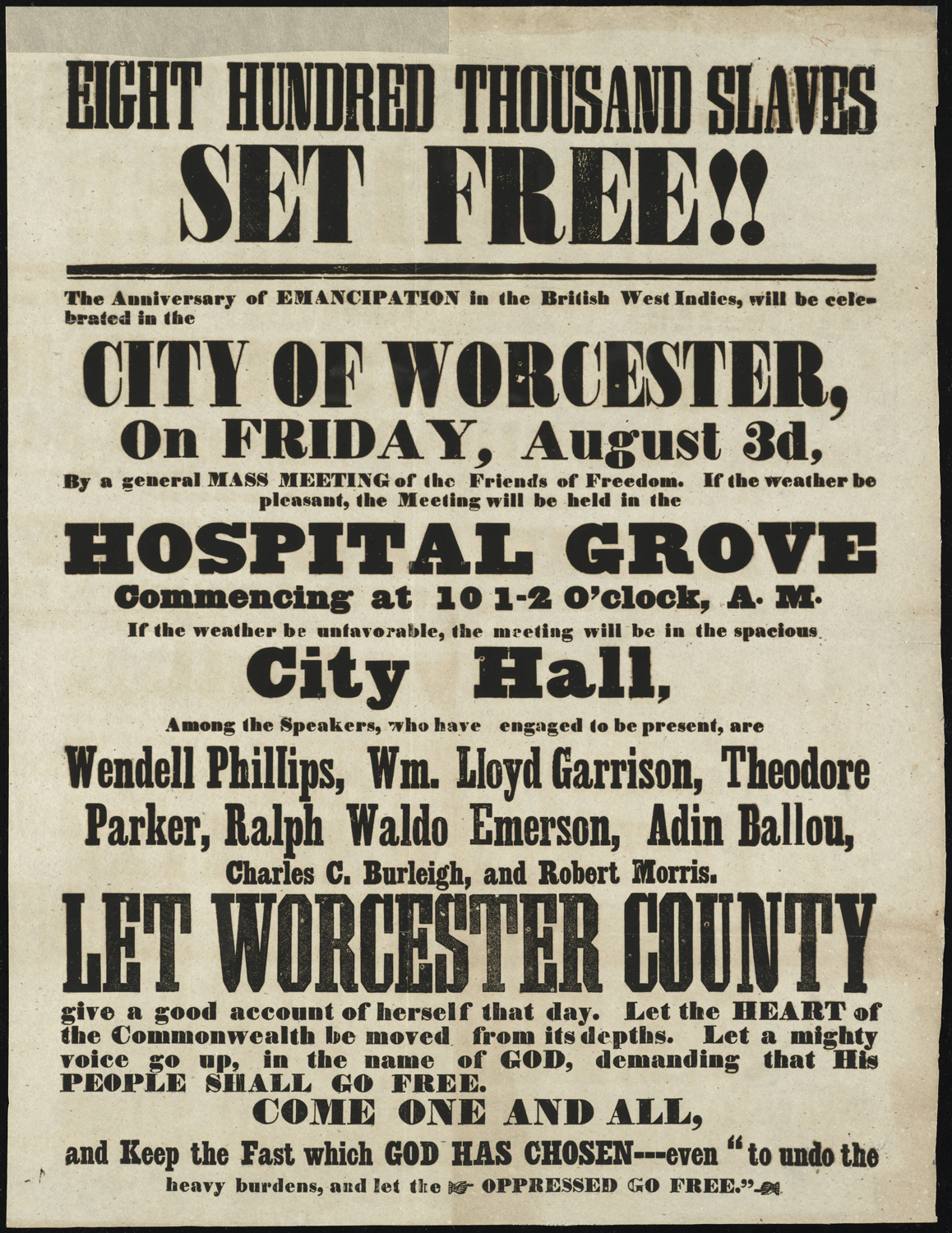
Poster for an event in Worcester, Massachusetts, in 1849, commemorating the end of slavery in the British West Indies.

=== British policy ===
The political and citizenship status of newly freed slaves was thoroughly debated among colonial authorities and members of Parliament. Britain's colonial secretary, Lord Glenelg, advocated social and political equality. In order to ensure full inclusion into the body politic, he proposed that colonial governors carry out full investigations of colonial laws and policies to eliminate those that were discriminatory or would hamper ex-slaves' social and economic opportunities. Local planters continued to wield significant power within the colonies following 1838 and though Parliament had legislated emancipation, the colonial assemblies dictated how it would be carried out. Many of these officials proved more reluctant to extend extensive rights to the freed slaves.

=== Reform ===
Missionaries, clergymen, and magistrates sought to morally, culturally and spiritually reform former slaves. In their view, enslavement had contributed to their debasement and the development of backwards cultural practices. They encouraged ex-slaves to legally marry, adopt the nuclear family model, and to take on Victorian gender roles which they believed were they path to achieving respectability and upward mobility. The patriarchal gender ideology they espoused dictated that men were to be heads of their households and responsible for providing for their dependents. Child rearing, caregiving, and domestic work were considered women's roles. To some extent, freedmen and women embraced these gender conventions but some aspects of the patriarchal model were incompatible with their economic circumstances, personal preferences and understandings of kinship. Marriage between former slaves did increase with emancipation. However, freedpeople considered their brother- sister, parent-child relationships equally, if not more important. Consequently, having children out of wedlock and single parent households were not uncommon or stigmatized.

Missionaries also established schools and encouraged the freed slaves to adopt Christianity, attend church and adopt the latest European fashions. Most did not adopt these practices wholesale. Instead, they took parts of the European model and melded them with their own African cultural practices. Former slaves often partook in leisure activities such as dancing, participating in carnivals, alcohol consumption, and gambling. Authorities and missionaries detested these practices as they considered them antithetical to their reform efforts. Historian Sheena Boa has suggested that because their mobility and choices were no longer controlled by outsiders, enjoyment of their own bodies was one way that freedmen and women "tested the limits of their freedom."

=== Land and labour ===
The export of sugar and other staple crops remained central to the economies of the British West Indies. Agricultural production required a substantial labour force and former slaves were expected to meet those labour demands. Some freedmen and women opposed working on their former plantations and all were only willing to labour on their own terms. Planters who were dependent on ex-slaves attributed their unwillingness to work to laziness. Many of the workers proved reluctant to work primarily due to poor wages. Others sought to perform different types of labour including skilled, mechanical and artisanal trades. The aspiration to become independent cultivators and to grow food to support their families and to turn a profit was ubiquitous among the freed West Indians but their success in this endeavor varied. When at all possible, they purchased, rented, and squatted on land. Some authorities and missionaries believed that land ownership would teach former slaves to be independent and industrious and therefore encouraged their efforts. However, in some regions, colonial officials barred freedmen from acquiring property through legal measures, imposition of high property taxes, and directives that required purchasers to buy substantial acreage which many former slaves could not afford. Freed persons who occupied Crown land without authorization were expelled and their provision grounds, used for subsistence or to grow crops for sale, were sometimes burnt or confiscated. Local ordinances stipulated that those not engaged in agricultural production were considered vagrants and subject to imprisonment. These land and employment measures limited independent cultivation and confined many ex-slaves to wage agricultural labour. The need for more cheap labour also led West Indian planters to turn to alternative labour sources, importing indentured labourers from India. British abolitionists would launch campaigns against the practise of importing indentured servants but they failed to achieve the same success they had in previous efforts.

==== Gender ====
Emancipation marked an exodus of black women from wage-based agricultural labour. Some women abandoned plantation fields altogether while others simply reduced the time they spent performing wage agricultural labour. Their exodus demonstrates that freed people did adopt gendered divisions of labour. However, this did not mean that women avoided labour outside of the home all together or simply mirrored western notions of domesticity. Their supplemental income was essential for supporting their families. Consequently, women often engaged in domestic agriculture and sold their crops in the market place while their male kin worked on the estates. Attempts to shield themselves from sexual abuse, the prioritization of child rearing, poor experiences under apprenticeship and political protest may also explain women's exodus from wage cultivation.

== Legacy ==
By the mid-19th century, just years after emancipation, the Caribbean's economy began to fail as a result of dropping sugar prices and planters in regions like Jamaica saw their plantations close down. In Jamaica, by 1865 sugar production was half of what it had been in 1834. These market shifts created massive unemployment, high taxes, and low wages and increased poverty. Living conditions on the islands failed to improve much over the next several decades.
