= John Alexander Paul Macgregor =

General John Alexander Paul Macgregor (1780 – 5 March 1868), born John Alexander Paul, was an officer in the Bengal Army.

== Early life and family ==
John Alexander Paul was born in 1780. His father, Lachlan Paul (né McPhail), was a Scottish-born Ensign in the Bengal Army. He set sail for India aboard the Chapman in March 1781, but died on 17 December that year, aged 25. John Paul's mother was Drummond Mary, only daughter of Duncan Murray or Macgregor, chief of clan Gregor. After Lachlan Paul's death, his widow married John Macgregor (died 1847 aged 83), a banker of Edinburgh. Her only brother, John (died 1784), a Commodore in the Bombay Marine, left his estate to John Paul on the condition that he assume Macgregor as his surname, which he did. Drummond Mary and John MacGregor had several children. The sons were: Duncan (died 1881), who served as a General in the British Army and received a knighthood; Peter (died 1815), a Captain in the Royal York Rangers; Alexander (died 1871); James Murray (died 1846); and Robert (died 1801). There were also two daughters, Mary who died in 1879, and Felicite.

Many of Macgregor's relatives were heavily involved in the military. His maternal grandfather, Duncan, was reportedly wounded in the Battle of Prestonpans in 1745 while fighting for the Jacobites; Duncan's brother, Evan, also fought with him, and Evan's son John was an officer in the East India Company, became chief of Clan Gregor and a baronet, and served as Military Auditor-General in Bengal. Sir John's own son, Evan John, was a Major-General and received a knighthood.

== Service ==
Macgregor was appointed a minor cadet of the Bengal Army on 22 November 1781. The practice of appointing young sons of officers to this rank was introduced by the East India Company in 1770 to recognise loyal service. The directors largely abolished the practice in 1786, finding "great reason to believe this indulgence has been much abused and we are thereby put to great expense". Macgregor was enlisted as a full cadet in 1795 and arrived in India on 4 February 1797; he was appointed an Ensign on 15 October 1797 and a Lieutenant fifteen days later. The following June he was attached to the 1st Bengal European Regiment and fought with them in the Fourth Mysore War (1798–99), including action at Malavelly and Seringapatam.

After the war, Macgregor transferred to the 2nd Volunteer Battalion and became its adjutant. He served in the Northern Circars in 1800, moved over to the 1st Battalion 2nd Native Infantry in 1801 and saw action with them at the Battle of Delhi in 1803, part of the Second Anglo-Maratha War. He was subsequently promoted to the rank of Captain on 1 May 1805, and served as Aide-de-Camp to the Governor-General from July 1810 to November 1813. Macgregor was posted as Fort Adjutant at Fort William between July 1812 and March 1813, and Deputy Military Auditor-General from 13 March 1813 to March 1830. During his time in that office, he was promoted to Major on 12 July 1814, Lieutenant-Colonel on 1 August 1818, Lieutenant-Colonel Commandant on 1 May 1824 and Colonel on 5 June 1829; he was posted a Lieutenant-Colonel in the 23rd Native Infantry in 1820, the 11th Native Infantry in 1823 and the 22nd Native Infantry in 1824, before he was transferred as Colonel of the 22nd Native Infantry in 1829.

Macgregor was then appointed Military Auditor-General on 26 March 1830. He was promoted to Major-General on 10 January 1837, but relinquished his post as Auditor-General in March 1846. On 9 November, he was promoted to Lieutenant-General and the following September became Colonel of the 54th Native Infantry, serving until his death. His last promotion came on 20 June 1854, when he was made a full General. He died in London on 5 March 1868.

== Personal life ==
In Calcutta in 1800, MacGregor had an illegitimate child named Thomas Paul MacGregor. The mother was an Indian woman local to Calcutta, however nothing else is known about her. Thomas Paul MacGregor later became a Lieutenant in the Bengal Auxiliary Cavalry. He moved to Scotland and married Katherine Livingstone, daughter of William Livingstone, in 1824. In 1846, he was sentenced to 10 years transportation after being found guilty of falsehood, fraud, and wilful imposition.

In May 1807, Alexander Paul MacGregor married Jane (died 1858), daughter of James Ness of Osgodby in Yorkshire. He had several children, including:

- Major-General Sir George Hall Macgregor, KCH (born 1810), who served with the Bengal Artillery. In 1845, he married Harriet (died 1873), daughter of Lieutenant-General Sir Thomas Whitehead, KCB, of Uplands Hall in Lancashire. In 1879, he married Flora Elizabeth, daughter of the Rev. Montagu Chudleigh Oxenden (died 1880), who was rector of Eastwell (1837–80) and Luddenham (1827–78) and the second son of the 7th Baronet Oxenden.
- Fanny Emily Macgregor, who died on 9 May 1839, aged 19.
- Eliza Macgregor, the second daughter, who married Sir Frederick James Halliday, KCB, in December 1834; he served as Lieutenant-Governor of Bengal.
- Fitz James Stewart Macgregor, who married Louisa Jane, daughter of John Wiltshire, of Shockerwick.
- Frederick Sackville Macgregor, who died in 1846.
