= Sir John Macgregor Murray, 1st Baronet =

Lieutenant-Colonel Sir John Macgregor Murray, 1st Baronet (10 April 1745 – 29 June 1822), born John Murray, was a Scottish army officer.

== Clan Gregor ==
John Murray was born on 10 April 1745, the eldest son of the major Evan Murray (1710–1778), an officer in the 88th Foot, by his wife Janet, daughter of John Macdonald of Balgony. (Note: His brothers were Peter (died childless 1803), who became a Lieutenant-Colonel in the East India Company's Army; Alexander (1746–1822), a Colonel of the Royal Clan Alpine Fencibles and the father of Major-General Alexander Murray Macgregor (1778–1827); and Robert, a Lieutenant-Colonel in the Royal Clan Alpine Fencibles, who married a daughter of Sir Alexander Mackenzie and left two daughters.) Murray was part of Clan Gregor (or Macgregor), but had been forced to assume the surname Murray as a result of the persecution of the clan and the outlawing of the name, which began in the 17th century. Murray's father Evan and Evan's elder brothers Robert and Duncan fought against the government in the Jacobite rising of 1745; their father John Og or Oig was regarded as the chief representative of the family. Being the eldest son, Robert succeeded him but died in 1758 (as did his only son), leaving Duncan as his heir. On Duncan's death in 1787, John Murray (being the eldest surviving son of the next brother) became the family's representative and chief of the clan. (Note: Duncan's only son, John (a Commodore in the Bombay Marine), died childless in 1784. Duncan had a daughter, Drummond Mary, whose eldest son was the Bengal army officer General John Alexander Paul, who adopted the surname Macgregor in accordance with John's will; Dummond Mary's sons by her second marriage (to John Macgregor, an Edinburgh banker) included General Sir Duncan Macgregor.) Murray was created a baronet on 3 July 1795; in 1822, he adopted the surname Macgregor before that of Murray.

== Military service ==
Murray became a cadet in the East India Company's army in 1770, and in 1771 he was commissioned as an ensign in the 2nd Bengal European Regiment and appointed Deputy Judge Advocate to the 2nd Brigade. In 1774, he was appointed military secretary and aide-de-camp to the commander-in-chief in India (Colonel Alexander Champion), served under Champion in the First Rohilla War and was present at St George's Battle (23 April 1774). In 1776, he was promoted to lieutenant and was appointed military secretary to the board of ordnance in Calcutta, serving until 1780. The following year he was promoted to captain; after a furlough between 1786 and 1788, he was military auditor general (with the rank of colonel) between 1789 and 1796. In the meantime, he was promoted to major in 1794. In 1796 he was appointed major of the 3rd Bengal European Regiment in 1796 and then lieutenant-colonel of the 15th Native Infantry in 1798 (taking the rank of lieutenant-colonel in the same year). He retired in 1799.

== Family and later life ==
In 1774, Murray married Anne, daughter of Roderick Macleod, WS, of Edinburgh. Murray (by then Macgregor Murray) died on 29 June 1822, of "inflammation of the bowels" at Portobello. Blackwood's Magazine noted "how zealously his latter days have been devoted to promoting the best interests and maintaining the ancient character of his native country, for enthusiastic patriotism and unaffected loyalty". His only son Evan John (1785–1841) succeeded him in the baronetcy and also enjoyed a successful military career.

== Likenesses ==
The Scottish National Portrait Gallery possesses a portrait (mezzotint on paper) of Sir John (accession number SPL 203.1); the author and date are unknown.

Baronetage of Great Britain
New creation	Baronet (of Lanrick); 1795–1822	Succeeded by Evan Murray-Macgregor
