= William Kerr, 5th Marquess of Lothian =

British Army general (1737–1815)

General The Most Honourable The Marquess of Lothian KT
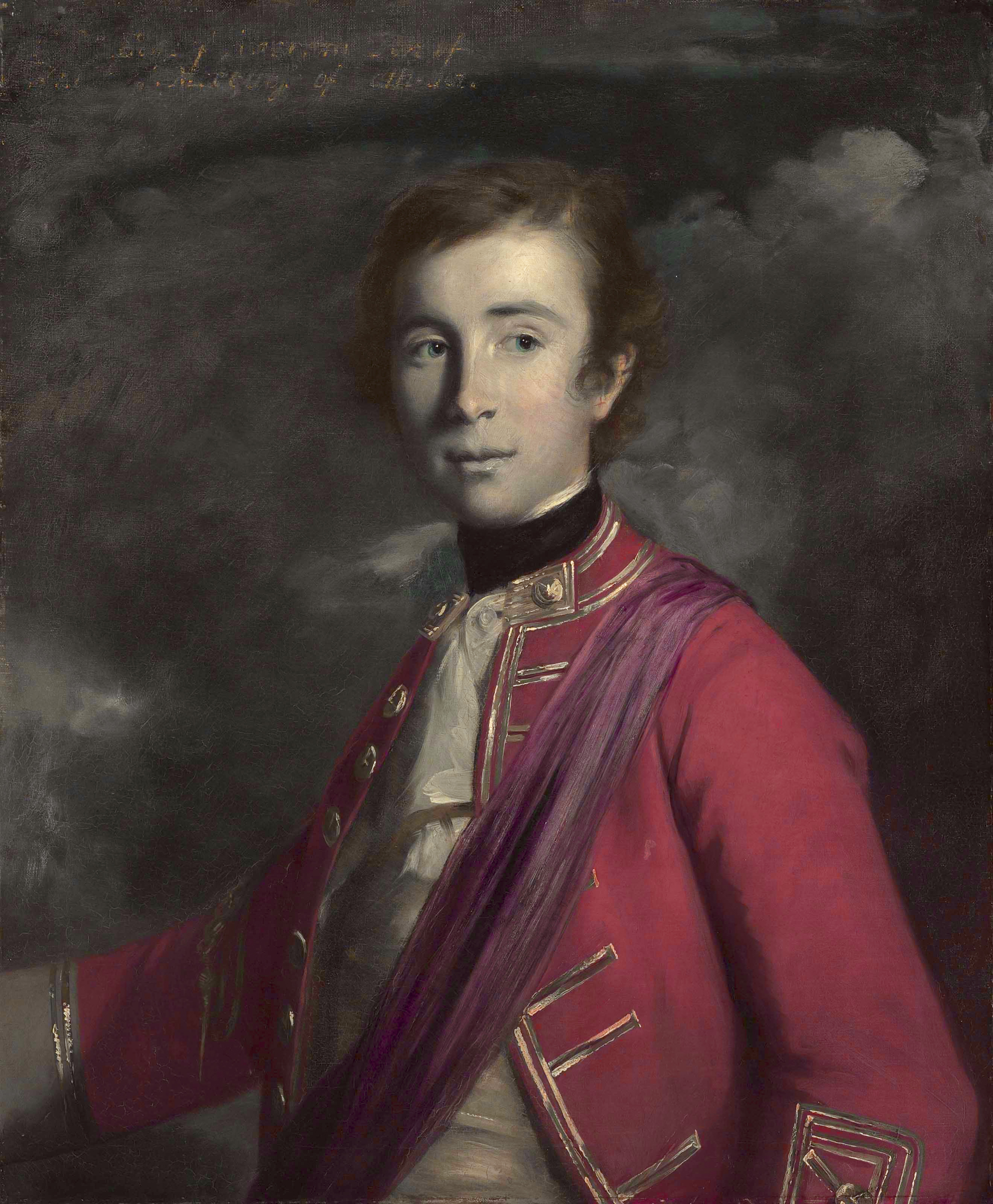
- Portrait by Sir Joshua Reynolds, late 1750s
- Born: 13 March 1737
- Died: 4 January 1815 (aged 77)
- Resting place: St Andrew's parish Church, Farnham, Surrey
- Spouse: Elizabeth Fortescue (m. 1762)
- Children: 9
- Parents: William Kerr, 4th Marquess of Lothian (father); Lady Caroline D'Arcy (mother)
- Relatives: 3rd Earl of Holderness (maternal grandfather); William Kerr, 6th Marquess of Lothian (son); Lord Mark Robert Kerr (son); Hon. Frederick St John (son-in-law); Arthur Atherley (son-in-law)

General William John Kerr, 5th Marquess of Lothian, KT (13 March 1737 – 4 January 1815), styled Lord Newbattle until 1767 and Earl of Ancram from 1767 to 1775, was a British soldier and peer.

== Early life ==
He was the son of William Kerr, 4th Marquess of Lothian and Lady Caroline D'Arcy (daughter of the 3rd Earl of Holderness and a scion of the House of Schomberg).

== Career ==
He succeeded to the title in 1775. During the Regency Crisis of 1788, he supported the rights of the Prince of Wales to become Regent. When George III recovered in the following year, Lothian was dismissed from the colonelcy of the Life Guards in consequence.

== Personal life ==
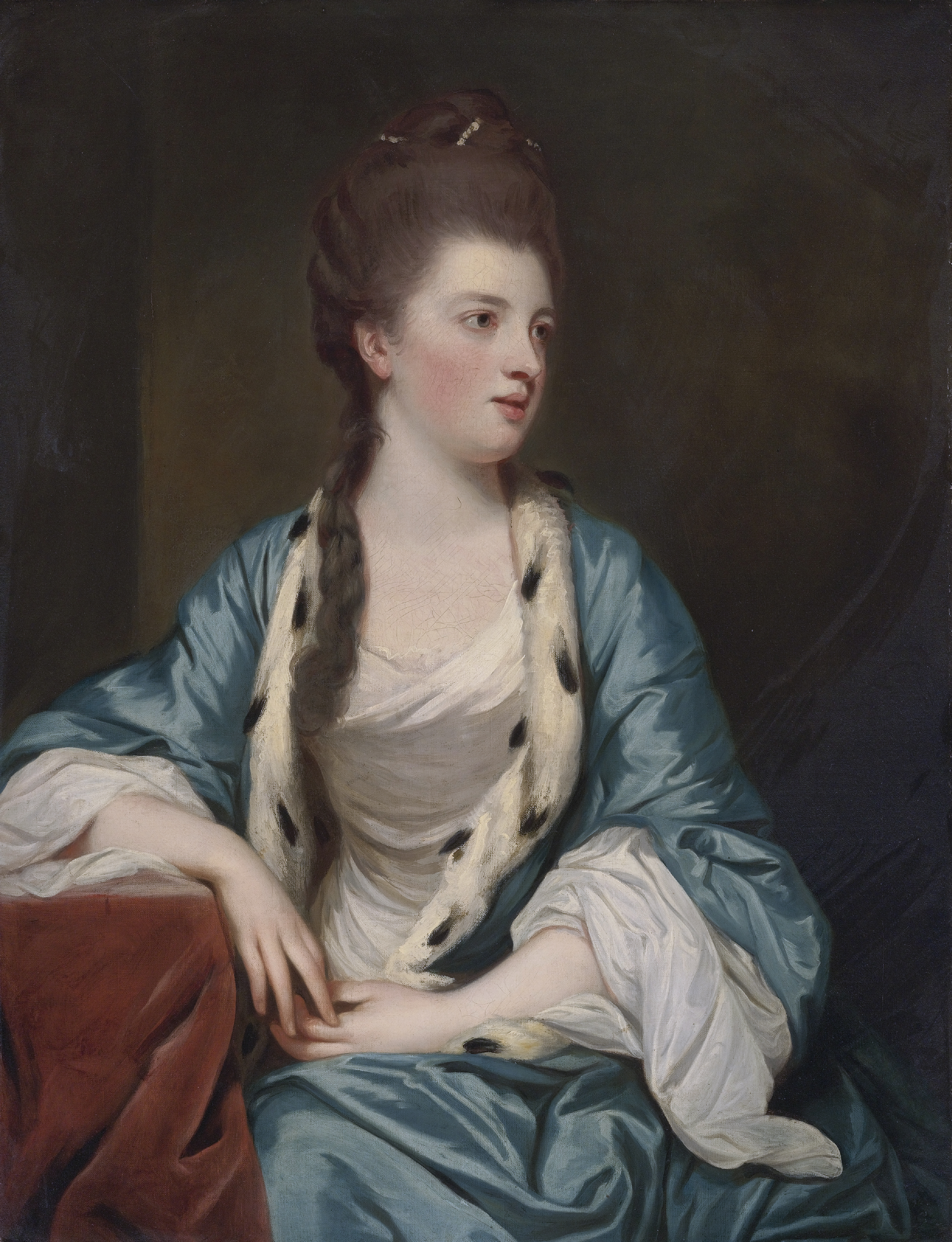
Elizabeth, Marchioness of Lothian (1745–1780), William Kerr's wife. (Joshua Reynolds, 1769)

He married Elizabeth Fortescue, daughter of Chichester Fortescue of Dromisken, County Louth, and Elizabeth (née Wesley), on 15 July 1762. They had nine children:

- William Kerr, 6th Marquess of Lothian (4 October 1763 – 27 April 1824)
- Lady Elizabeth Kerr (2 September 1765 – 13 August 1822), married John Dormer, 10th Baron Dormer, without issue
- Lady Caroline Sidney Kerr (8 September 1766 – 24 January 1829)
- Lady Mary Kerr (5 December 1767 – 6 February 1791), married Gen. Hon. Frederick St John and had issue
- Lady Louisa Kerr (30 November 1768 – 23 June 1819), who married Arthur Atherley on 2 June 1793 and had issue
- Lady Harriet Kerr (b. 12 October 1770; died young)
- Lord Charles Beauchamp Kerr (19 July 1775 – 2 March 1816), married Elizabeth Crump (d. 1830) and had issue
- Vice-Admiral Lord Mark Robert Kerr (12 November 1776 – 9 September 1840), married Charlotte Macdonnell, suo jure Countess of Antrim, and had issue
- Maj.-Gen. Lord Robert Kerr (14 September 1780 – 23 June 1843), married Mary Gilbert (d. 1861) and had issue

He was buried at St Andrew's parish Church, Farnham, Surrey on 19 January 1815.

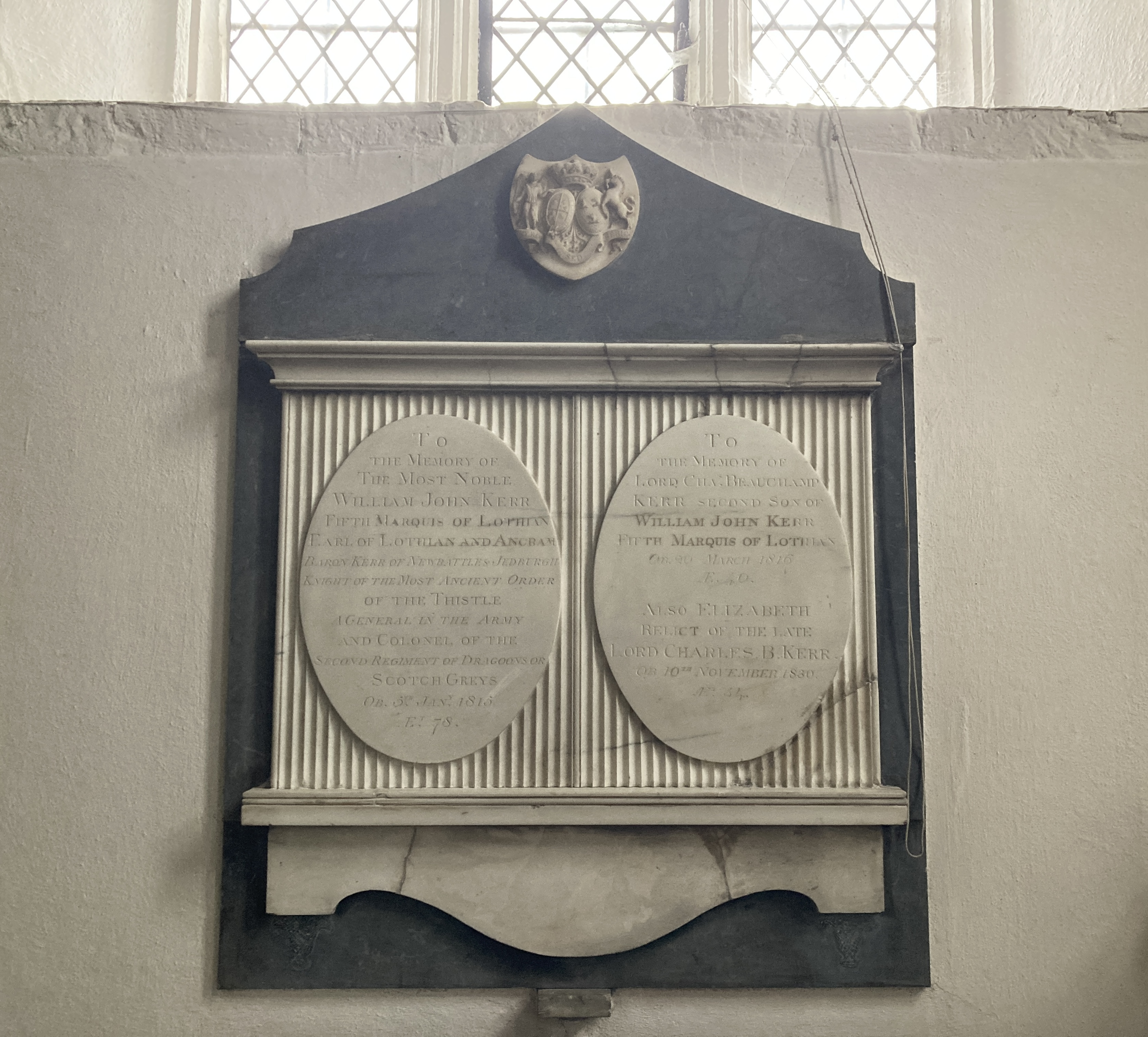
Wall memorial to Lord William John Kerr in St Andrew's Church in Farnham, Surrey

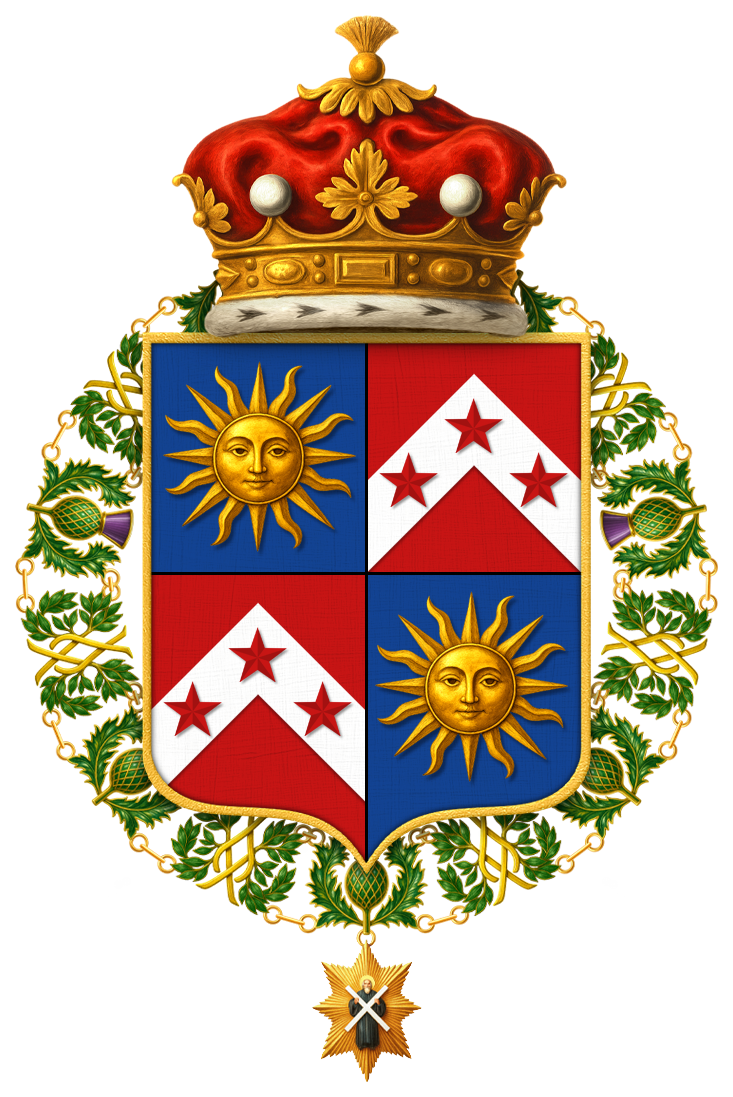
Shield of Arms of William John Kerr, 5th Marquess of Lothian, KT

Military offices
Preceded by The Earl De La Warr	Captain and Colonel of His Majesty's Own Troop of Horse Guards; 1777–1788	Became the 1st Life Guards
New title	Colonel of the 1st Regiment of Life Guards; 1788–1789	Succeeded by The Lord Dover
Preceded by Studholme Hodgson	Colonel of the 11th Regiment of (Light) Dragoons; 1798–1813	Succeeded by Lord William Bentinck
Preceded by Sir David Dundas	Colonel of the 2nd (Royal North British) Regiment of Dragoons; 1813–1815	Succeeded by Sir James Steuart-Denham
Peerage of Scotland
Preceded by William Kerr	Marquess of Lothian; 1775–1815	Succeeded by William Kerr
