= Montagu Bertie, 5th Earl of Abingdon =

English peer

Montagu Bertie, 5th Earl of Abingdon (30 April 1784 – 16 October 1854), styled Lord Norreys until 1799, was an English peer.

== Background ==
Bertie was the third son of Willoughby Bertie, 4th Earl of Abingdon, and Charlotte Warren, a daughter of Peter Warren (Royal Navy officer) and a descendant of the Schuyler family, the Van Cortlandt family, and the Delancey family of British North America. As his two elder brothers predeceased their father, on the latter's death on 26 September 1799 he succeeded him as 5th Earl of Abingdon. His father died insolvent, having sold off much of the estates at Westbury, Wiltshire, but he retained control of the burgages and hence the disposal of the Parliamentary seats for Westbury. The 4th Earl had sold the nomination of members there since 1786 to raise money; his trustees and successor continued the practice until 1810 when he sold the manor and control of the seats to Sir Manasseh Lopes.

== Public life ==
Lord Abingdon was awarded a DCL by Oxford University on 3 July 1810. He was Lord Lieutenant of Berkshire between 1826 and 1854 and High Steward of Abingdon. In 1836, he bought the manor of North Weston, now in Great Haseley but then in Thame where he also owned the manor of that name.

== Family ==
Lord Abingdon married his first wife Emily Gage (d. 28 August 1838), daughter of General the Honourable Thomas Gage and Margaret Kemble, on 27 August 1807, she was a distant cousin with common ancestry to the Schuyler family and Van Cortlandt families of British North America. They lived at Wytham Abbey in Berkshire (now Oxfordshire) and had eight children:

- Montagu Bertie, 6th Earl of Abingdon (1808–1884)
- Lady Charlotte Margaret Bertie (23 July 1809 – 7 November 1893)
- Lady Emily Caroline Bertie (11 August 1810 – 18 March 1891), married on 31 July 1830 to Hon. Rev. Charles Bathurst (d. 1842), without issue
- Hon. Albemarle Bertie (26 September 1811 – 4 February 1825)
- Hon. Rev. Henry William Bertie (16 September 1812 – 31 December 1894), vicar of Great Ilford
- Lady Augusta Georgiana Bertie (14 April 1815 – 7 May 1815)
- Hon. Vere Peregrine Bertie (23 November 1817 – 21 March 1818)
- Lt. Hon. Brownlow Charles Bertie (19 August 1819 – 30 December 1852 on the steamer from Panama to San Francisco)

Abingdon's second wife was Lady Frederica Augusta Kerr, daughter of Vice-Admiral Lord Mark Robert Kerr and Charlotte MacDonnell, 3rd Countess of Antrim, whom he married on 11 March 1841.

== Notes ==
Honorary titles
Preceded by The Earl of Craven	Lord Lieutenant of Berkshire; 1826–1854	Succeeded by The Earl of Abingdon
Peerage of England
Preceded by Willoughby Bertie	Earl of Abingdon; 1799–1854	Succeeded by Montagu Bertie
