= Mark Robert Pechell =

Royal Navy Admiral (1830-1902)

Admiral Mark Robert Pechell
- Born: 6 July 1830
- Died: 9 July 1902 (aged 72)
- Spouse: Ellen Maria Derby (m. 1861)
- Children: 9
- Parents: Rev. Horace Robert Pechell (father); Lady Caroline Mary Kerr (mother)
- Relatives: Lord Mark Kerr (maternal grandfather); Sir Arthur Russell (son-in-law)
- Military career
- Allegiance: United Kingdom
- Branch: Royal Navy
- Service years: 1850-1892
- Rank: Admiral
- Unit: HMS Lark
- Conflicts: Crimean War; Baltic Expedition of 1854-55

Admiral Mark Robert Pechell (6 July 1830 – 9 July 1902) was a British Royal Navy officer who took part in the Baltic Expedition during the Crimean War 1854-55.

== Biography ==
Pechell was the second son of the Rev. Horace Robert Pechell (1792-1882), Fellow of All Souls, and rector of Bix, near Henley-on-Thames, by his wife Lady Caroline Mary Kerr (d.1869), daughter of Lord Mark Kerr and Charlotte McDonnell, Countess of Antrim.

He joined the Royal Navy, and served in the Baltic Expedition of 1854-55, when an Anglo-French fleet entered the Baltic sea to attack the Russian naval base of Kronstadt during the Crimean War. Pechell was in command of the gunboat HMS Lark at the bombardment of Sveaborg.

Pechell was promoted to admiral on the retired list on 14 February 1892.

He died at his residence in London on 9 July 1902.

Pechell married, in 1861, Ellen Maria Derby (d.1908), daughter of Cobbett Derby and niece of Sir Samuel Fludyer. The couple left nine children, including Captain Mark Horace Kerr Pechell (1867-1899) and Captain Charles Augustus Kerr Pechell (1869-1899), who both died a couple of days apart in South Africa during the early days of the Second Boer War. The youngest daughter, Aileen Kerr Pechell (ca 1879-1920), was the wife of Sir Arthur Russell, 6th Baronet. Another daughter, Maud Louisa Pechell, was the mother of Mark Ogilvie-Grant by her marriage to the ornithologist William Robert Ogilvie-Grant.
