= Thomas Parker, 5th Earl of Macclesfield =

British peer

The Right Honourable The Earl of Macclesfield

High Sheriff of Oxfordshire
- In office 1808–1809
- Preceded by: William Hodges
- Succeeded by: John Harrison

Personal details
- Born: Thomas Parker; 9 June 1763
- Died: 31 March 1850 (aged 86)
- Spouse(s): Miss Edwards (m. 1796; died 1803) Eliza Wolstenholme (m. 1807; died 1850)
- Children: 7, including Thomas
- Parent(s): Thomas Parker, 3rd Earl of Macclesfield; Mary Heathcote

Thomas Parker, 5th Earl of Macclesfield (9 June 1763 – 31 March 1850), was a British peer.

== Early life ==
Arms of Parker, Earls of Macclesfield: Gules, a chevron between three leopard's faces or

He was the younger son of Thomas Parker, 3rd Earl of Macclesfield and the former Mary Heathcote, who were first cousins. Among his siblings were Lady Elizabeth Parker (who married John Fane, son of Henry Fane, MP), Lady Mary Parker, and George Parker, 4th Earl of Macclesfield.

His paternal grandparents were George Parker, 2nd Earl of Macclesfield, and Mary Lane (a daughter of Ralph Lane). His maternal grandparents were Sir William Heathcote, 1st Baronet, and Elizabeth Parker (only daughter of the 1st Earl of Macclesfield).

== Career ==
Parker was an officer in the Coldstream Guards between 1780 and 1782. He held the office of High Sheriff of Oxfordshire between 1808 and 1809 while residing at Eynsham Hall, North Leigh, West Oxfordshire, which he later leased for hunting parties. He graduated from Oxford University in 1834 with a Doctor of Civil Law.

He held the office of High Steward of Henley in 1842. Upon the death of his brother, George, in 1842, he succeeded to the earldom of Macclesfield in the Peerage of Great Britain.

== Personal life ==
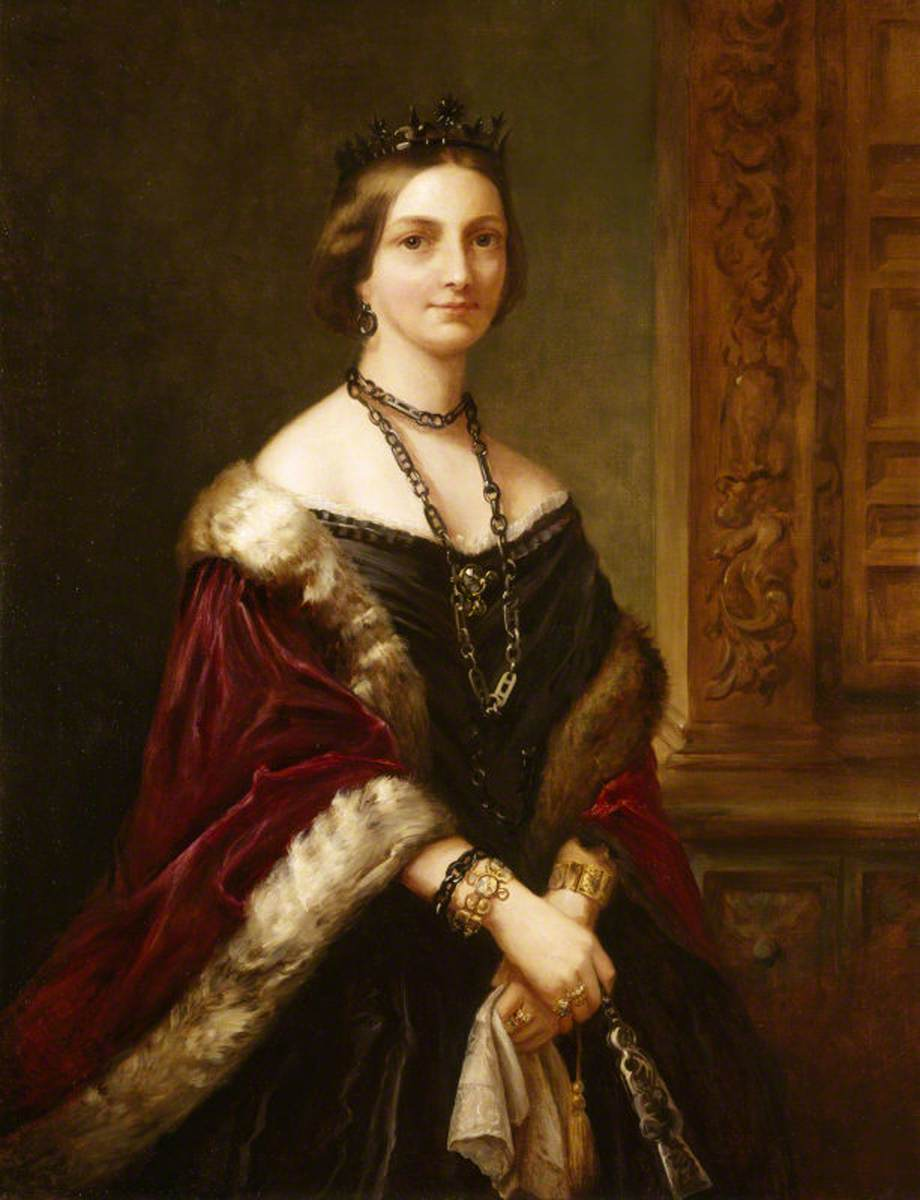
Portrait of his daughter, Lady Laura Parker, later Countess of Antrim, between c. 1835 and c. 1845

On 16 March 1796, he married Miss Edwards (died 1803), a daughter of Lewis Edwards of Talgarth, Merionethshire, Wales. Before her death on 9 April 1803, they were the parents of four daughters, including:

- Lady Ellen Catherine Parker (died 1844), who married, as his second wife, Col. John William Fane, MP for Oxfordshire, in 1829.
- Lady Amelia Parker (died 1881), who married William Montgomery, a son of the Rev. Hugh Montgomery of Grey Abbey, Down and Hon. Georgiana Ward (a daughter of the 1st Viscount Bangor), in 1817.
- Lady Matilda Anne Parker (died 1888), who married Arthur Hill Montgomery of Tyrells, County Down, Ireland, in 1825.

After the death of his first wife, he married secondly Eliza Wolstenholme (1781–1862), daughter of William Breton Wolstenholme, on 19 March 1807. Together, they were the parents of a son and two daughters, including:

- Lady Lavinia Agnes Parker (died 1893), who married the Hon. John Thomas Dutton of Hinton House, Alresford, son of John Dutton, 2nd Baron Sherborne and Hon. Mary Legge (a daughter of the 2nd Baron Stawell), in 1836.
- Lady Laura Cecilia Parker (1808–1883), who married Hugh Seymour McDonnell, 4th Earl of Antrim, son of Vice-Admiral Lord Mark Robert Kerr and Charlotte Kerr, 3rd Countess of Antrim, in 1836.
- Thomas Augustus Wolstenholme Parker, 6th Earl of Macclesfield (1811–1896), an MP for Oxfordshire who married Henrietta Turnor, daughter of Edmond Turnor, in 1839. After her death four months later, he married Lady Mary Frances Grosvenor, daughter of Richard Grosvenor, 2nd Marquess of Westminster and sister of Hugh Grosvenor, 1st Duke of Westminster, in 1842.

Lord Macclesfield died on 31 March 1850. He was succeeded in the earldom by his only son, Thomas.

=== Descendants ===
Through his daughter Lady Amelia, he was a grandfather of Hugh Montgomery, who married Lady Charlotte Elizabeth Herbert (the youngest daughter of Edward Herbert, 2nd Earl of Powis), in 1846.

Honorary titles
Preceded by William Hodges	High Sheriff of Oxfordshire; 1808–1809	Succeeded by John Harrison
Peerage of Great Britain
Preceded by George Parker	Earl of Macclesfield; 1842–1850	Succeeded by Thomas Parker
