= List of MPs elected to the English Parliament in 1689 =

This is a list of members of Parliament (MPs) elected to the Convention Parliament of 1689 which transferred the crowns of England, Scotland and Ireland from James II to William III. The speaker was Henry Powle. The Parliament first met on 22 January 1689 (but officially 13 February 1689) and lasted until it was dissolved on 23 February 1690.

== List of constituencies and members ==
=== Bedfordshire ===
| Constituency | Members | Notes |
| Bedfordshire | Hon. Edward Russell; William Duncombe | |
| Bedford | Thomas Hillersden; Thomas Christie | |
=== Berkshire ===
| Constituency | Members | Notes |
| Berkshire | Lord Norreys; Sir Henry Winchcombe, Bt. | |
| Windsor | Henry Powle; Sir Christopher Wren | Wren's election declared void. Replaced May 1689 by Sir Algernon May |
| Reading | Sir Henry Fane; Sir William Rich, Bt | |
| Wallingford | Sir Thomas Tipping, Bt; William Jennens | |
| Abingdon | Thomas Medlycott | Election declared void. Medlycott replaced May 1689 by John Southby |
=== Buckinghamshire ===
| Constituency | Members | Notes |
| Buckinghamshire | Thomas Lee; Hon. Thomas Wharton | |
| Buckingham | Sir Richard Temple, Bt; Sir Ralph Verney, Bt | |
| Wycombe | Thomas Lewes; William Jephson | |
| Amersham | Sir William Drake; Edmund Waller | |
| Aylesbury | Thomas Lee; Richard Beke | |
| Great Marlow | Sir John Borlase, Bt; Viscount Falkland | Borlase died and replaced February 1689 by John Hoby. Hoby then died and was replaced December 1689 by Sir William Whitlock |
| Wendover | Richard Hampden; John Hampden | |
=== Cambridgeshire ===
| Constituency | Members | Notes |
| Cambridgeshire | Levinus Bennet; Sir Robert Cotton | |
| Cambridge | John Cotton; Sir Thomas Chicheley | |
| Cambridge University | Robert Sawyer; Isaac Newton | |
=== Cheshire ===
| Constituency | Members | Notes |
| Cheshire | Sir Robert Cotton, Bt; John Mainwaring | |
| City of Chester | Roger Whitley; George Mainwaring | |
=== Cornwall ===
| Constituency | Members | Notes |
| Cornwall | Sir John Carew, Bt; Hugh Boscawen | |
| Launceston | William Harbord; Edward Russell | |
| Liskeard | Sir Bourchier Wrey, Bt; John Buller | |
| Lostwithiel | Hon. Francis Robartes; Walter Kendall | |
| Truro | Sir Henry Ashurst, Bt; Henry Vincent | |
| Bodmin | Sir John Cutler, Bt; Nicholas Glyn | |
| Helston | Sir John St Aubyn, Bt; Charles Godolphin | |
| Saltash | Hon. Bernard Granville; John Whaddon | |
| Westlow | James Kendall; Percy Kirke | |
| Grampound | Edward Herle; John Tanner | |
| Eastlow | Charles Trelawny; Henry Trelawny | |
| Camelford | Ambrose Manaton; Henry Manaton | |
| Penryn | Anthony Rowe; Alexander Pendarves | |
| Tregony | Charles Boscawen; Hugh Fortescue | Boscawen died and was replaced April 1689 by Robert Harley, 1st Earl of Oxford and Earl Mortimer |
| St Ives | James Praed; Walter Vincent | |
| Mitchel | Charles Fanshawe, 4th Viscount Fanshawe; Francis Vyvyan | Fanshawe discharged as non-juror and replaced September 1689 by William Coryton. Coryton replaced December 1689 on petition by Humphrey Courtney. |
| Bossiney | Sir Peter Colleton, Bt; Humphrey Nicoll | |
| Fowey | Jonathan Rashleigh II; Shadrach Vincent | |
| St Germans | Daniel Eliot; Sir Walter Moyle | |
| St Mawes | Sir Joseph Tredenham; Henry Seymour | |
| Newport | Sir William Morice, Bt; John Speccot | |
| Callington | Sir John Coryton, Bt; Jonathan Prideaux | |
=== Cumberland ===
| Constituency | Members | Notes |
| Cumberland | Sir John Lowther, Bt; Sir George Fletcher, Bt | |
| Carlisle | Sir Christopher Musgrave, Bt; Jeremiah Bubb | |
| Cockermouth | Sir Henry Capell; Henry Fletcher | |
=== Derbyshire ===
| Constituency | Members | Notes |
| Derbyshire | Sir John Gell, Bt; Sir Gilbert Clarke | Gell died February, 1689 and was replaced in April, 1689 by Philip Gell |
| Derby | Hon. Anchitell Grey; John Coke | |
=== Devon ===
| Constituency | Members | Notes |
| Devon | Francis Courtenay; Samuel Rolle | |
| Exeter | Henry Pollexfen; Edward Seymour | Pollexfen appointed to Crown office and replaced June 1689 by Christopher Bale |
| Totnes | Rawlin Mallock; Sir John Fowell, Bt | |
| Barnstaple | Richard Lee; Sir Arthur Chichester, Bt | |
| Plymouth | John Maynard; Arthur Herbert, 1st Earl of Torrington | Herbert ennobled and replaced in July 1689 by Hon John Granville |
| Okehampton | Henry Northleigh; William Cary | |
| Plympton Erle | George Treby; John Pollexfen | |
| Tavistock | Lord Robert Russell; Sir Francis Drake, Bt | |
| Tiverton | Samuel Foote|William Colman | |
| Ashburton | Sir Walter Yonge, Bt; Thomas Reynell | |
| Bere Alston | John Maynard; John Elwill | Maynard sat for Plymouth and was replaced Jan 1689 by Sir John Holt. Holt appointed to Crown office and replaced May 1689 by Sir John Trevor. |
| Clifton Dartmouth Hardness | Charles Boone; William Hayne | Boone died and was replaced September 1689 by George Booth. Booth replaced on petition Nov 1689 by Sir Joseph Herne |
| Honiton | Edmund Walrond; Richard Courtenay | |
=== Dorset ===
| Constituency | Members | Notes |
| Dorset | Thomas Strangways; Thomas Freke | |
| Dorchester | Gerard Napier; Thomas Trenchard | Napier died and was replaced in December 1689 by Thomas Chafin |
| Poole | Henry Trenchard; Sir Nathaniel Napier, Bt | |
| Shaftesbury | Sir Matthew Andrews; Edward Nicholas | |
| Weymouth and Melcombe Regis | Henry Henning; Sir John Morton, Bt; Michael Harvey; Sir Robert Napier, Bt | |
| Lyme Regis | John Pole; John Burridge | |
| Wareham | Thomas Erle; George Ryves | Ryves dies and was replaced May 1689 by Thomas Skinner |
| Bridport | Richard Brodrepp; John Manley | |
| Corfe Castle | William Okeden; Richard Fownes | |
=== Durham ===
| Constituency | Members | Notes |
| County Durham | Robert Byerley; William Lambton | |
| City of Durham | George Morland; Henry Liddell | |
=== Essex ===
| Constituency | Members | Notes |
| Essex | Henry Mildmay; John Wroth | |
| Colchester | Samuel Reynolds; Isaac Rebow | |
| Harwich | Thomas Middleton; John Eldred | |
| Maldon | Charles Montagu, 1st Earl of Halifax; Sir Thomas Darcy, Bt | |
=== Gloucestershire ===
| Constituency | Members | Notes |
| Gloucestershire | Sir John Guise, Bt; Sir Ralph Dutton, Bt | |
| Gloucester | Sir Duncombe Colchester; William Cooke | |
| Cirencester | Thomas Master; John Grobham Howe | |
| Tewkesbury | Richard Dowdeswell; Sir Francis Russell, Bt | |
=== Hampshire ===
| Constituency | Members | Notes |
| Hampshire | Earl of Wiltshire; Lord William Powlett | Powlett sat for Winchester and was replaced February 1689 by Thomas Jervoise |
| Winchester | Francis Morley; Lord William Powlett | |
| Southampton | Sir Benjamin Newland; Richard Brett | Brett died and replaced November 1689 by Edward Fleming . Fleming replaced December 1689 on petition by Sir Charles Wyndham |
| Portsmouth | Richard Norton; Henry Slingsby | |
| Petersfield | Robert Michell; Thomas Bilson | |
| Yarmouth | Robert Holmes; Hon. Fitton Gerard | |
| Newport | Sir Robert Dillington, Bt; Sir William Stephens | Dillington died and was replaced June 1689 by Edward Dillington |
| Newtown | Thomas Done; Richard Jones, 1st Earl of Ranelagh | |
| Lymington | Richard Holt; John Burrard | |
| Christchurch | Francis Gwyn; William Ettrick | |
| Stockbridge | Richard Whithed; Oliver St John | St John died and was replaced September 1689 by William Montagu. Election declared void and Montagu replace December 1689 by Thomas Neale. |
| Whitchurch | Lord James Russell; Henry Wallop | |
| Andover | Francis Powlett; John Pollen | |
=== Herefordshire ===
| Constituency | Members | Notes |
| Herefordshire | Sir John Morgan, Bt; Edward Harley | |
| Hereford | William Gregory; Paul Foley | Gregory appointed to Crown office and replaced June 1689 by Henry Cornewall |
| Leominster | Thomas Coningsby, 1st Earl Coningsby; John Dutton Colt | |
| Weobley | John Birch; James Morgan | |
=== Hertfordshire ===
| Constituency | Members | Notes |
| Hertfordshire | Sir Thomas Blount, Bt; Sir Charles Caesar | |
| Hertford | Thomas Byde; Sir William Cowper, Bt | |
| St Albans | George Churchill; Samuel Grimston | |
=== Huntingdonshire ===
| Constituency | Members | Notes |
| Huntingdonshire | Robert Montagu; Sir Robert Bernard, Bt | |
| Huntingdon | John Bigg; Hon. Sidney Wortley-Montagu | |
=== Kent ===
| Constituency | Members | Notes |
| Kent | Sir Vere Fane; John Knatchbull | |
| Canterbury | Sir William Honywood, Bt; Henry Lee | |
| Rochester | Sir John Banks, Bt; Sir Roger Twisden, Bt | |
| Queenborough | Robert Crawford; James Herbert | |
| Maidstone | Sir Thomas Taylor, Bt; Caleb Banks | |
=== Lancashire ===
| Constituency | Members | Notes |
| Lancashire | Viscount Brandon; Sir Charles Hoghton, Bt | |
| Preston | Hon. James Stanley; Thomas Patten | |
| Lancaster | Curwen Rawlinson; Thomas Preston | Rawlinson died and was replaced November 1689 by Roger Kirkby |
| Newton | Sir John Chicheley; Francis Cholmondeley | |
| Wigan | Sir Edward Chisenhall; William Banks | |
| Clitheroe | Anthony Parker; Christopher Wilkinson | |
| Liverpool | Viscount Colchester; Thomas Norris | |
=== Leicestershire ===
| Constituency | Members | Notes |
| Leicestershire | Sir Thomas Halford, Bt; Lord Sherard | |
| Leicester | Lawrence Carter; Thomas Babington | |
=== Lincolnshire ===
| Constituency | Members | Notes |
| Lincolnshire | Sir Thomas Hussey, Bt; Viscount Castleton | |
| Lincoln | Henry Monson; Sir Christopher Nevile | Monson discharged as non-juror and replaced by Sir Edward Hussey, Bt |
| Boston | Lord Willoughby de Eresby; Sir William Yorke | |
| Grimsby | Sir Edward Ayscough; Sir Thomas Barnardiston, Bt | |
| Stamford | William Hyde; Hon. Charles Bertie | |
| Grantham | Sir John Brownlow, Bt; Sir William Ellys, Bt | |
=== Middlesex ===
| Constituency | Members | Notes |
| Middlesex | Sir Charles Gerard, Bt; Ralph Hawtrey | |
| Westminster | Philip Howard; William Pulteney | |
| City of London | Sir Robert Clayton; Thomas Pilkington; Sir Patience Ward; William Love | Love died and was replaced May 1689 by Sir William Ashhurst |
=== Monmouthshire ===
| Constituency | Members | Notes |
| Monmouthshire | Charles Somerset, Marquess of Worcester; Sir Trevor Williams, Bt | |
| Monmouth Boroughs | John Arnold | Arnold sat for Southwark and was replaced February 1689 by John Williams |
=== Norfolk ===
| Constituency | Members | Notes |
| Norfolk | Sir William Cook, Bt; Sir Henry Hobart, Bt | |
| Norwich | Thomas Blofield; Sir Nevill Catlin | |
| King's Lynn | Sir John Turner; Sigismund Trafford | |
| Yarmouth | George England; Samuel Fuller | |
| Thetford | Sir Henry Hobart, Bt; William Harbord | Hobart sat for Norfolk and was replaced February 1689 by Sir Francis Guybon. Harbord sat for Launceston and was replaced June 1689 by John Trenchard |
| Castle Rising | Sir Robert Howard; Robert Walpole | |
=== Northamptonshire ===
| Constituency | Members | Notes |
| Northamptonshire | Edward Harby; Edward Montagu | Harby died and was replaced June 1869 by Sir Thomas Samwell, Bt |
| Peterborough | Sir William Brownlow, Bt; Charles FitzWilliam | FitzWilliam died and replaced December 1689 by Sir Gilbert Dolben, Bt |
| Northampton | Sir William Langham, Bt; Sir Justinian Isham, Bt | |
| Brackley | Richard Wenman, 4th Viscount Wenman; John Parkhurst | |
| Higham Ferrers | Sir Rice Rudd, 2nd Baronet | Rudd sat for Carmarthenshire and was replaced Feb 1689 by Hon. Lewis Watson. Watson ennobled and replaced July 1689 by Thomas Andrew |
=== Northumberland ===
| Constituency | Members | Notes |
| Northumberland | William Forster; Philip Bickerstaffe | |
| Newcastle | Sir Ralph Carr; Sir William Blackett, Bt | |
| Morpeth | Charles Howard, 3rd Earl of Carlisle; Roger Fenwick | |
| Berwick upon Tweed | Francis Blake; Philip Babington | |
=== Nottinghamshire ===
| Constituency | Members | Notes |
| Nottinghamshire | Scrope Howe, 1st Viscount Howe; Lord Houghton | Lord Houghton ennobled and replaced May 1689 by John White |
| Nottingham | Francis Pierrepont; Edward Bigland | |
| East Retford | Hon. Evelyn Pierrepont; John Thornhagh | |
| Newark | William Savile, 2nd Marquess of Halifax; Nicholas Saunderson | |
=== Oxfordshire ===
| Constituency | Members | Notes |
| Oxfordshire | Sir Robert Jenkinson, Bt; Sir John Cope, Bt | |
| Oxford | Hon. Henry Bertie; Sir Edward Norreys | |
| Oxford University | Heneage Finch; Sir Thomas Clarges | |
| Woodstock | Sir Thomas Littleton, Bt; Sir John D'Oyly, Bt | |
| Banbury | Sir Robert Dashwood, Bt | |
=== Rutland ===
| Constituency | Members | Notes |
| Rutland | Bennet Sherard; Sir Thomas Mackworth, Bt | |
=== Salop ===
| Constituency | Members | Notes |
| Shropshire | Edward Kynaston; Hon Richard Newport | |
| Shrewsbury | Hon. Andrew Newport; Sir Francis Edwardes, Bt | |
| Bridgnorth | Sir William Whitmore, Bt; Sir Edward Acton, Bt | |
| Ludlow | Francis Herbert; Charles Baldwyn | |
| Wenlock | William Forester; George Weld | |
| Bishops Castle | Richard More; Walter Waring | |
=== Somerset ===
| Constituency | Members | Notes |
| Somerset | Edward Gorges; George Horner | |
| Bristol | Sir Richard Hart; John Knight | |
| Bath | Maurice Berkeley, 3rd Viscount Fitzhardinge; Sir William Bassett | |
| Milborne Port | John Hunt; Thomas Saunders | |
| Wells | Edward Berkeley; Thomas Wyndham | Wyndham died and was replaced January 1690 by William Coward |
| Taunton | Sir William Portman, Bt; John Sanford | |
| Bridgwater | Henry Bull; Sir Francis Warre, Bt | |
| Ilchester | Sir Edward Wyndham, Bt; William Helyar | |
| Minehead | Nathaniel Palmer; Francis Lutrell | |
=== Staffordshire ===
| Constituency | Members | Notes |
| Staffordshire | Sir Walter Bagot, Bt; Hon. John Grey | |
| Lichfield | Robert Burdett; Michael Biddulph | |
| Stafford | Philip Foley; John Chetwynd | |
| Newcastle under Lyme | William Leveson-Gower; John Lawton | |
| Tamworth | Hon. Henry Sidney; Henry Gough | Sidney ennobled and replaced May 1689 by Henry Boyle |
=== Suffolk ===
| Constituency | Members | Notes |
| Suffolk | Sir John Cordell, Bt; Sir John Rous, Bt | |
| Ipswich | Peyton Ventris; Sir John Barker, Bt | Ventris appointed to Crown office and replaced May 1689 by Sir Charles Blois, Bt |
| Bury St Edmunds | Sir Thomas Hervey; Sir Robert Davers, Bt | |
| Dunwich | Sir Philip Skippon; Sir Robert Rich, Bt | |
| Orford | Thomas Glemham; Sir John Duke, Bt | |
| Eye | Thomas Knyvett; Henry Poley | |
| Aldeburgh | Sir Henry Johnson; William Johnson | |
| Sudbury | John Poley; Philip Gurdon | |
=== Surrey ===
| Constituency | Members | Notes |
| Surrey | Richard Onslow, 1st Baron Onslow; George Evelyn | |
| Southwark | John Arnold; Sir Peter Rich | |
| Bletchingly | Thomas Howard; John Glyd | Glyd died and was replaced December 1689 by Jeffey Amherst |
| Reigate | Roger James; Sir John Parsons | Parsons replaced on petition March 1689 by Thomas Vincent |
| Gatton | Sir John Thompson, Bt; Thomas Turgis | |
| Guildford | Foot Onslow; John Weston | |
| Haslemere | White Tichborne; Denzil Onslow | |
=== Sussex ===
| Constituency | Members | Notes |
| Sussex | Sir John Pelham, Bt; Sir William Thomas, Bt | |
| Chichester | Thomas Miller; Thomas May | |
| Horsham | John Machel; Anthony Eversfield | |
| Midhurst | William Morley; John Lewknor | |
| Lewes | Thomas Pelham; Richard Bridger | |
| New Shoreham | Edward Hungerford; John Monke | |
| Steyning | Sir James Morton; Sir John Fagg, Bt | |
| Bramber | John Alford; Charles Goring | |
| East Grinstead | Sir Thomas Dyke, Bt; Thomas Sackville | |
| Arundel | William Garway; William Morley | |
=== Warwickshire ===
| Constituency | Members | Notes |
| Warwickshire | Sir Richard Newdigate, Bt; Sir Richard Verney | |
| Coventry | Sir Roger Cave, Bt; John Stratford | |
| Warwick | William Colemore; William Digby, 5th Baron Digby | |
=== Westmorland ===
| Constituency | Members | Notes |
| Westmoreland | Sir John Lowther, Bt; Henry Wharton | Wharton died and was replaced December 1689 by Goodwin Wharton |
| Appleby | Richard Lowther; Philip Musgrave | Musgrave died and was replaced July 1689 by William Cheyne |
=== Wiltshire ===
| Constituency | Members | Notes |
| Wiltshire | Viscount Cornbury; Sir Thomas Mompesson | |
| Salisbury | Thomas Hoby; Giles Eyre | Eyre appointed to Crown office and replaced May 1689 by Thomas Pitt |
| Wilton | Thomas Penruddocke; Thomas Wyndham | |
| Downton | Maurice Bocland; Sir Charles Raleigh | |
| Hindon | Robert Hyde; John Milner | |
| Heytesbury | William Ashe; William Sacheverell | |
| Chippenham | Henry Bayntun; Nicholas Bayntun | |
| Calne | Henry Chivers; Lionel Duckett | |
| Devizes | Sir William Pynsent, Bt; Walter Grubbe | |
| Ludgershall | John Smith; John Deane | |
| Great Bedwyn | Sir Edmund Warneford; John Wildman I | |
| Cricklade | Charles Fox; Edmund Webb | Webb replaced April 1689 on petition by Thomas Freke |
| Malmesbury | Thomas Tollemache; Hon Henry Wharton | Wharton sat for Westmorland and was replaced by Charles Godfrey |
| Westbury | Richard Lewis; Hon. Peregrine Bertie | |
| Old Sarum | John Young; Thomas Pitt | Election voided. Replaced March 1689 by William Harvey and John Hawles |
| Wootton Bassett | Henry St John; John Wildman II | |
| Marlborough | Sir John Ernle; George Willoughby | |
=== Worcestershire ===
| Constituency | Members | Notes |
| Worcestershire | Sir James Rushout, Bt; Thomas Foley | |
| Worcester | William Bromley; Sir John Somers | |
| Droitwich | Samuel Sandys; The Lord Coote | |
| Bewdley | Henry Herbert | |
| Evesham | Henry Parker; Sir John Matthewes | |
=== Yorkshire ===
| Constituency | Members | Notes |
| Yorkshire | Lord Fairfax of Cameron; Sir John Kaye, Bt | |
| York | Viscount Dunblane; Edward Thompson | |
| Kingston upon Hull | John Ramsden; William Gee | |
| Scarborough | William Harbord; Francis Thompson | Harbord sat for Launceston and was replaced February 1689 by William Thompson |
| Knaresborough | William Stockdale; Thomas Fawkes | |
| Richmond | Thomas Yorke; Hon John Darcy | Darcy died and was replaced Feb 1689 by his brother Hon. Philip Darcy |
| Beverley | Sir Michael Warton; Sir John Hotham, Bt | Hotham died and was replaced May 1689 by Sir John Hotham, Bt |
| Aldborough | Sir Michael Wentworth; Christopher Tancred | |
| Malton | William Palmes; Sir William Strickland, Bt | |
| Northallerton | Thomas Lascelles; William Robinson | |
| Thirsk | Thomas Frankland; Richard Staines | |
| Hedon | Henry Guy; Matthew Appleyard | |
| Ripon | Sir Jonathan Jennings; Sir Edward Blackett, Bt | |
| Boroughbridge | Christopher Vane; Sir Henry Goodricke, Bt | |
| Pontefract | Sir Thomas Yarburgh; John Dawnay, 1st Viscount Downe | |
=== Cinque Ports ===
| Constituency | Members | Notes |
| Hastings | Thomas Mun; John Ashburnham | Ashburnham ennobled and replaced August 1689 by John Beaumont |
| Sandwich | John Thurbarne; Sir James Oxenden, Bt | |
| Dover | Sir Basil Dixwell, Bt; Thomas Papillon | |
| Romney | John Brewer; James Chadwick | |
| Hythe | Edward Hales; Julius Deedes | |
| Rye | Thomas Frewen; John Darell | Frewen replaced on petition April 1689 by Sir John Austen, Bt |
| Seaford | William Campion; Sir Nicholas Pelham | |
| Winchelsea | Robert Austen; Samuel Western | |
=== Wales ===
| Constituency | Members | Notes |
| Anglesey | Hon. Thomas Bulkeley | |
| Beaumaris | William Williams | |
| Brecknockshire | Edward Jones | |
| Brecknock | Thomas Morgan | |
| Carnarvon | Sir Robert Owen | |
| Carnarvonshire | Sir William Williams, Bt | |
| Cardiganshire | John Lewis | |
| Cardigan | Hector Phillips | |
| Carmarthenshire | Sir Rice Rudd, Bt | |
| Carmarthen | Richard Vaughan | |
| Denbighshire | Sir Richard Myddelton, Bt | |
| Denbigh Boroughs | Edward Brereton | |
| Flintshire | Sir Roger Puleston | |
| Flint | Sir John Hanmer, Bt | |
| Glamorgan | Bussy Mansell | |
| Cardiff | Thomas Mansel | |
| Merioneth | Sir John Wynn, Bt | |
| Montgomeryshire | Edward Vaughan | |
| Montgomery | Charles Herbert | |
| Pembrokeshire | Sir Hugh Owen, Bt | |
| Pembroke | Arthur Owen | |
| Haverford West | William Wogan | |
| Radnorshire | Rowland Gwynne | |
| Radnor | Richard Williams | |

== See also ==
- List of MPs elected to the English parliament in 1597
- The Golden Speech
