= Robert Jenkinson =

Robert Jenkinson may refer to:

- Robert Jenkinson (canoeist) (born 1960), New Zealand sprint canoer
- Robert Jenkinson, 2nd Earl of Liverpool (1770–1828), Prime Minister of the United Kingdom
- Sir Robert Jenkinson, 1st Baronet (1621–1677)
- Sir Robert Jenkinson, 2nd Baronet (c. 1654–1710) of the Jenkinson baronets, MP for Oxfordshire
- Sir Robert Jenkinson, 3rd Baronet (1685–1717) of the Jenkinson baronets, MP for Oxfordshire
- Sir Robert Jenkinson, 5th Baronet (1720–1766) of the Jenkinson baronets
