= Rowney =

Rowney is a surname. Notable people with the name include:

- Carter Rowney (born 1989), Canadian professional ice hockey forward
- Chris Rowney (born 1991), English professional footballer
- Loren Rowney (born 1988), Australian former racing cyclist
- Paul Rowney (born 1970), Australian Olympic cyclist
- Thomas Rowney (1668–1727), English Tory politician and MP
- Thomas Rowney (died 1759) (1693–1759), British Tory politician, MP for 37 years

== See also ==
- Daler-Rowney, English art materials manufacturer based in Bracknell
- Rowney Green, village in the Bromsgrove District of Worcestershire
