= Philip Wenman =

Philip Wenman may refer to:

- Philip Wenman, 3rd Viscount Wenman (1610–1686), MP for Oxfordshire
- Philip Wenman, 6th Viscount Wenman (1719–1760)
- Philip Wenman, 7th Viscount Wenman (1742–1800)
