= Anthony Cary, 5th Viscount Falkland =

British politician and nobleman (1656–1694)

The Right Honourable The Viscount Falkland PC

Treasurer of the Navy
- In office 1681–1689
- Preceded by: Sir Edward Seymour
- Succeeded by: Edward Russell

Member of the England Parliament for Oxfordshire
- In office 1685–1689 Serving with Sir Thomas Tipping
- Preceded by: Thomas Horde; Sir Philip Harcourt
- Succeeded by: Sir Robert Jenkinson; Sir John Cope

Member of the England Parliament for Great Marlow
- In office 1689–1690 Serving with Sir John Borlase, 2nd Baronet 1689; John Hoby 1689; Sir William Whitelock 1689–1690
- Preceded by: Sir Humphrey Winch; Sir John Brolase
- Succeeded by: James Chase; Sir William Whitelock

Member of the England Parliament for Great Bedwyn
- In office 1690–1694 Serving with Sir Jonathan Raymond
- Preceded by: Sir John Wildman; Sir Edmund Warneford
- Succeeded by: Sir Jonathan Raymond; Francis Stonehouse

First Lord of the Admiralty
- In office 1693–1694
- Preceded by: Charles Cornwallis
- Succeeded by: Edward Russell

Personal details
- Born: 16 February 1656 Farley Castle, Somerset, England
- Died: 24 May 1694 (aged 38)
- Party: Tory
- Spouse: Rebecca Lytton
- Children: 1
- Parent: Henry Cary (father)
- Relatives: Anthony Hungerford (grandfather); Lucius Cary (grandfather)

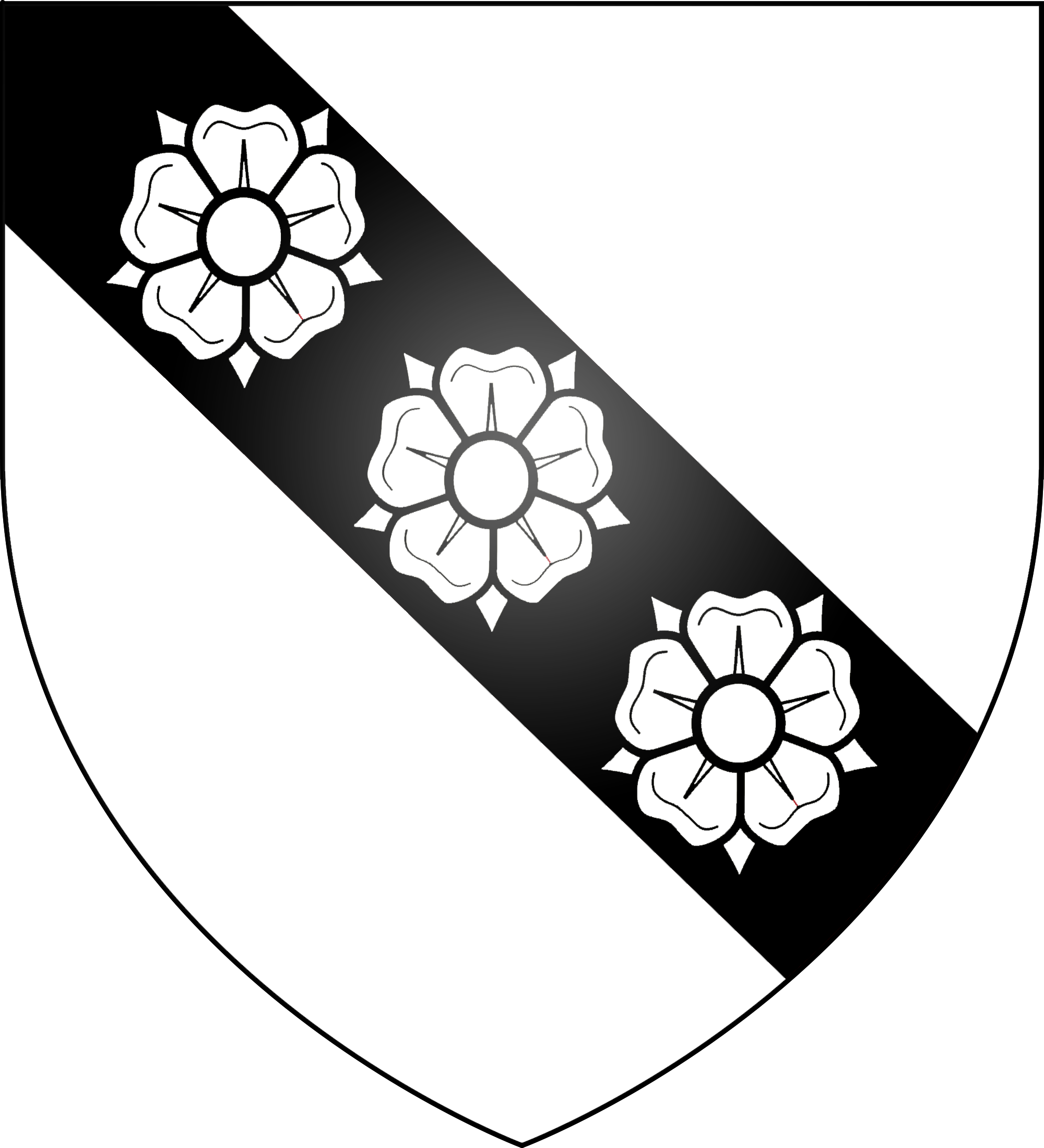
Coat of arms of the Carey family of Chilton Foliat

Anthony Cary, 5th Viscount Falkland, PC (16 February 1656 – 24 May 1694) was an English nobleman and politician.

== Biography ==
Cary was born at Farley Castle, Somerset, the son of Henry Cary, 4th Viscount Falkland, to whose peerage he succeeded as a child in 1663.

He married Rebecca Lytton and had one daughter:

- Harriott Cary (d. 21 October 1683)

As his peerage title was Scottish, he was able to sit in the English House of Commons. He thus served as Tory MP for Oxfordshire for 1685–1689, Great Marlow from 1689 to 1690, and Great Bedwyn from 1690 until his death.

He was sworn of the Privy Council of England in 1692 and served as First Lord of the Admiralty from 1693 to 1694. He had previously held office with the latter department as Treasurer of the Navy from 1681 to 1689, under Charles II and James II, and as Commissioner of the Admiralty from 1690 to 1693. Samuel Pepys had a rather low opinion of his abilities, while admitting that he suffered from chronic ill health.

In March 1694 he was committed to the Tower of London on charges of peculation, but was released three days later. He died of smallpox in May, aged 38, without male issue. He was buried in Westminster Abbey.

The Falkland Islands are named in his honour. The Viscounts Falkland in turn take their title from the royal residence of Falkland in Fife, Scotland.

Political offices
Preceded by Edward Seymour	Treasurer of the Navy; 1681–1689	Succeeded by Edward Russell
Preceded by The Lord Cornwallis	First Lord of the Admiralty; 1693–1694	Succeeded by Edward Russell
Parliament of England
Preceded by Thomas Horde; Sir Philip Harcourt	Member of Parliament for Oxfordshire; 1685–1689; With: Thomas Tipping	Succeeded by Sir Robert Jenkinson, Bt; Sir John Cope, Bt
Preceded by Sir John Borlase Bt; Sir Humphrey Winch, Bt	Member of Parliament for Great Marlow; 1689–1690; With: Sir John Borlase Bt 1689; John Hoby 1689; Sir William Whitelock 1689–1690	Succeeded by Sir William Whitelock; James Chase
Preceded by Sir Edmund Warneford; John Wildman	Member of Parliament for Great Bedwyn; 1690–1694; With: Sir Jonathan Raymond	Succeeded by Sir Jonathan Raymond; Francis Stonehouse
Peerage of Scotland
Preceded by Henry Cary	Viscount Falkland; 1663–1694	Succeeded by Lucius Cary
