= William Whitelock =

English barrister and Tory politician

Sir William Whitelock KC (27 December 1636 – 22 November 1717) was an English barrister and Tory politician. His name is also spelt Whitelocke (which was preferred by his father) and Whitlock.

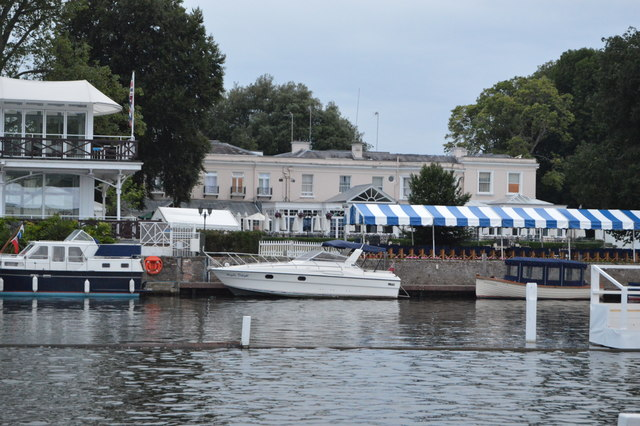
Phyllis Court, Henley-on-Thames

== Early life ==
Whitelock was the second son of Sir Bulstrode Whitelocke (1605–1675), parliamentarian and one of Oliver Cromwell's Commissioners of the Great Seal of England. He was the first son of his father's second wife, Frances Willoughby (died 1649), a daughter of William Willoughby, 3rd Baron Willoughby of Parham. As a young man Whitelock joined the Middle Temple in 1647 and was called to the bar in 1655. He married, in 1671, Mary Overbury, the daughter of Sir Thomas Overbury of Bourton on the Hill, Gloucestershire.

== Parliamentary career ==
In 1659 Whitelock was elected to the short-lived Third Protectorate Parliament called by Richard Cromwell, but sat for only one session, from 27 January to 22 April 1659, as one of the two members of parliament for Westlow in Cornwall. After Cromwell had dissolved this parliament in April, he recalled the earlier Rump Parliament, in which Whitelock was not a member. In 1660 the Commonwealth collapsed, and the House of Stuart was restored. He succeeded his father at Phillis Court, Henley-on-Thames, Oxfordshire, in 1675.

Whitelock did not return to parliament until shortly after the Glorious Revolution. He was appointed a King's Counsel to William of Orange in 1689 until 1695, and was knighted on 10 April 1689. In December 1689 he won the by-election at Great Marlow caused by the death of John Hoby, becoming one of the borough's two Members in the House of Commons of England. A few months later, at the general election of 1690, he was elected for Great Marlow again and sat for it until the 1695 English general election. In 1702 he was appointed Queen's Counsel for Queen Anne. At a by-election on 22 November 1703 caused by the departure of Heneage Finch for the House of Lords, Whitelock was elected to represent the High Tory constituency of the University of Oxford. After the Union of England and Scotland in 1707, he continued to represent the University in the enlarged House of Commons of Great Britain. He was returned again at the 1708 British general election and at the 1710 British general election.

At the 1715 British general election Whitlocke was returned unopposed for the University of Oxford, and described as ‘a recognised Jacobite’ in the list of that Parliament drawn up for George I. He was also described as being well heard by the House of Commons, ‘car il ne manque jamais de faire rire’ (because he never fails to raise a laugh). He spoke against the Address in March 1715. In August with Shippen, Sir William Wyndham, and John Hungerford he was one of the only Tory speakers against the impeachment of the late Tory ministers. He also spoke against the septennial bill in April 1716.

== Later life and legacy ==
Whitelock died at Phillis Court on 22 November 1717 and was buried at Fawley, Buckinghamshire, the principal family estate. He left five sons and eight daughters. His death was reported as follows:

Sir William Whitelock of Phillis-Court in the County of Oxon. Knight, Member for the University of Oxford, one of His Majesty's Council at Law, Nov. 22. 1717.

Whitelock was an extreme Tory, and fond of old fashions. On one occasion, he was speaking in the House of Commons and said "as black as – ", to be interrupted by an opponent with "your shoe-strings!" Whitelock replied "Sir, I remember when there were more shoe-strings and fewer coxcombs in this assembly!" On another occasion, in 1714, Whitelock began a speech in the Commons with a reference to the Elector of Hanover: "If he ever comes to the throne, which I hope he never will..." This was met with angry shouts from the Whigs and by demands for him to take his words back. Whitelock replied calmly that Queen Anne was younger than her appointed heir and that he hoped she would outlive him.

== Notes ==
Parliament of England
Preceded by Viscount of Falkland; John Hoby	Member of Parliament for Great Marlow; 1689–1695; With: Viscount of Falkland	Succeeded by James Chase; Sir James Etheridge
Preceded by William Bromley; Sir Heneage Finch	Member of Parliament for University of Oxford; 1703–1707; With: William Bromley	Succeeded by Parliament of Great Britain
Parliament of Great Britain
Preceded by Parliament of England	Member of Parliament for University of Oxford; 1707–1717; With: William Bromley	Succeeded by George Clarke; William Bromley
