= Edward Norreys (1634–1712) =

English Tory Member of Parliament for Oxford

Sir Edward Norreys (August 1634 – September/October 1712) was an English Tory politician who represented Oxfordshire constituencies in the English, and later British, House of Commons between 1675 and 1679 and 1689 and 1708.

== Biography ==
Norreys was the second but only surviving son of Sir Francis Rose (also known by the surname Norreys) of Weston-on-the-Green, Oxfordshire and Hester Rouse, daughter of Sir John Rouse. His father was the illegitimate son of Francis Norris, 1st Earl of Berkshire and Sarah Rose. He was educated at The Queen's College, Oxford from 1650 before entering Lincoln's Inn in 1654. Between 1656 and 1658 he travelled in France. Norreys was knighted by Charles II on 22 November 1662 and on 9 November that year he married Jane Clarke, daughter of Sir John Clarke of Shabington.

In 1666 he was appointed a justice of the peace for Oxfordshire and he was made a deputy lieutenant of the county two years later. Norreys was elected to the House of Commons of England as the Member of Parliament for Oxfordshire in a by-election in November 1675. He made few contributions to the Cavalier Parliament. He was returned for the county seat again in March 1679. In the second election of 1679 and in the elections of 1681 and 1685, he unsuccessful stood for election in Oxford as an opponent of the Exclusion Bill.

In late 1687, he refused to answer the questions of James II's agents on whether he would support repeal of the Test Act and he was removed from his local offices in February 1688. Following the Glorious Revolution, Norreys was elected to represent Oxford but stayed relatively inactive in parliament. He appears to have been a friend of Sir Cyril Wyche, who placed his house on Jermyn Street at Norreys' disposal during the 1692–3 parliamentary session.

Norreys remained a Tory, at first refusing the Association of 1696. In November 1696 he voted against the attainder of Sir John Fenwick, 3rd Baronet. An analysis of the Commons from 1700 recorded him as a supporter of Thomas Osborne, 1st Duke of Leeds. Between 1701 and 1708, Norreys returned to representing the county seat, including in the First Parliament of Great Britain from 1707. In 1704 he was among the High Church Tories to vote in favour of the Tack. Norreys stood down at the 1708 British general election, likely as a result of old age.

Norreys died in 1712 and was buried at Weston-on-the-Green on 5 October that year. By his wife he had four sons and five daughters. All of his sons, including Francis Norreys, predeceased him and his estates were inherited by Henry Bertie, the husband of his eldest daughter Philadelphia. One of Norreys' daughters, Susanna, was the second wife of Sir Cyril Wyche.

Parliament of England
Preceded by Sir Francis Wenman, Bt; Sir Anthony Cope, Bt	Member of Parliament for Oxfordshire; 1675–1679; With: Sir Francis Wenman, Bt (1675–1679); Sir John Cope, Bt (1679)	Succeeded by Sir John Cope, Bt; Thomas Horde
Preceded by Hon. Henry Bertie; George Pudsey	Member of Parliament for Oxford; 1689–1701; With: Hon. Henry Bertie (1689–1695); Thomas Rowney (1695–1701)	Succeeded by Thomas Rowney; Francis Norreys
Preceded by Sir Robert Jenkinson, Bt; Sir Robert Dashwood, Bt	Member of Parliament for Oxfordshire; 1701–1707; With: Sir Robert Jenkinson, Bt	Succeeded by Parliament of Great Britain
Parliament of Great Britain
Preceded by Parliament of England	Member of Parliament for Oxfordshire; 1707–1708; With: Sir Robert Jenkinson, Bt	Succeeded by Sir Robert Jenkinson, Bt; Viscount Rialton
