= James Chase (apothecary) =

English apothecary and Whig politician

James Chase (c. 1650 – 23 June 1721), of Westhorpe House, Little Marlow, Buckinghamshire. was an English apothecary and Whig politician who sat in the English and British House of Commons from 1690 to 1710. From 1690 he was Court apothecary to King William III, Queen Anne and King George I.

== Early life ==
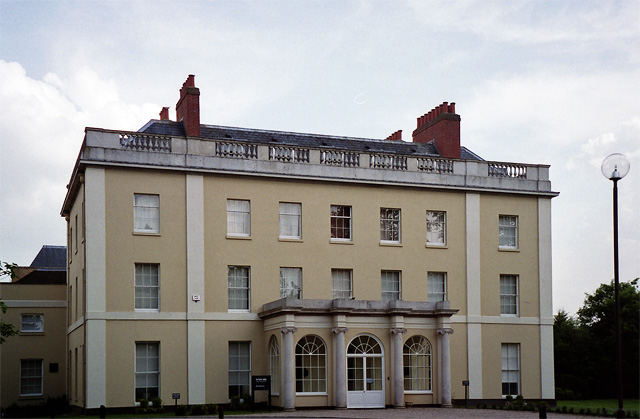
Westhorpe House

Chase was the eldest son of John Chase of Littlebrook, Kent and his wife Elizabeth Soane, daughter of Dr Thomas Soane, canon of Windsor. His father was court apothecary to Charles II, and James II, having succeeded his own father in 1666, who was court apothecary to Charles I and, after the Restoration, to Charles II. Chase matriculated at Christ Church, Oxford on 15 December 1665, aged 15. He married Elizabeth Box, daughter of Sir Ralph Box of Cheapside, London on 17 November 1677. In 1684, he acquired his estate in Little Marlow and built Westhorpe House there during Queen Anne's reign.

== Court apothecary ==
Chase was a Freeman of the Apothecaries’ Company and was its Master from June 1688 to September 1689. His father's patent granted the reversion of the office to Chase himself, and after his father's death in 1690, Chase became court apothecary to William III in June 1690, at an annual salary of £115, with an annual allowance of £127 and lodgings in Whitehall. He was subsequently court apothecary to Queen Anne and King George I.

== Political career ==
At the 1690 English general election Chase was returned as Member of Parliament for Great Marlow in Buckinghamshire. He was returned again unopposed in 1695, 1698 and in the two general elections of 1701. He was unopposed again at the 1702 English general election and 1705 English general election. In June 1706 he was appointed a commissioner for sick and wounded, but resigned the following May. At the 1708 British general election he was returned in a contest as a Whig. He voted for the naturalization of the Palatines in 1709 and for the impeachment of Dr Sacheverell in 1710. At the 1710 British general election he was mixed up in a double return and waived his right of election on 8 December 1710. He was defeated at Marlow at the 1715 British general election.

== Death and legacy ==
Chase died without issue on 23 June 1721 leaving his estate to his widow and Dr Stephen Chase, the eldest son of his cousin, also Stephen Chase.

== Notes ==
Parliament of England
Preceded by Viscount of Falkland; William Whitelock	Member of Parliament for Great Marlow; 1690–1707; With: William Whitelock 1690–1695 with James Etheridge 1695–1707	Succeeded by Parliament of Great Britain
Parliament of Great Britain
Preceded by Parliament of England	Member of Parliament for Great Marlow; 1707–1710; With: James Etheridge 1707–1710	Succeeded by James Etheridge; George Bruere
