= Francis Knollys (MP, died 1754) =

British Tory politician (c. 1697–1754)

Francis Knollys (c. 1697–1754) of Thame, Oxfordshire. and Lower Winchendon, Buckinghamshire was a British Tory politician who sat in the House of Commons from 1722 to 1734.

Knollys was the eldest son of Francis Knollys, MP of Lower Winchendon and his wife Elizabeth Striblehill, daughter of John Striblehill of Thame, Oxfordshire. He succeeded his father at the age of 4 in 1701. He was educated at Thame Grammar School and matriculated at Hart Hall, Oxford on 7 April 1714, aged 16.

Knollys was returned as a Tory Member of Parliament for Oxford at a by-election on 24 October 1722 on the interest of Thomas Rowney, to whom he was related. He was returned unopposed again at the 1727 general election. In March 1733, he was taken into custody by the serjeant-at-arms as he was one of the defaulters on the call of the House on 13 March 1733. His only recorded vote was against the Excise Bill immediately after his release from custody He did not stand at the 1734 general election.

Knollys died unmarried on 24 June 1754.

Parliament of Great Britain
Preceded by Thomas Rowney, junior Sir John Walter	Member of Parliament for Oxford; 1722–1734; With: Thomas Rowney, junior	Succeeded by Thomas Rowney, junior Matthew Skinner
