= Sir Banks Jenkinson, 4th Baronet =

British lawyer and politician

Sir Banks Robert Jenkinson, 4th Baronet (24 January 1687 – 2 July 1738), was a British lawyer and politician who sat in the House of Commons from 1717 to 1727.

== Biography ==
Jenkinson was the second son of Sir Robert Jenkinson, 2nd Baronet, and his wife Sarah Tomlins (daughter of Thomas Tomlins of Bromley, Middlesex), and was baptised on 24 January 1687. He matriculated at Trinity College, Oxford, on 18 February 1703. He was admitted at Lincoln's Inn in 1705 and was called to the bar in 1713. He succeeded his brother Sir Robert Jenkinson, 3rd Baronet, on 29 October 1717. He married Catherine Dashwood, daughter of Sir Robert Dashwood, 1st Baronet, MP of Northbrook, Oxfordshire, on 12 June 1718.

Jenkinson succeeded his brother as Member of Parliament for Oxfordshire at a by-election on 4 December 1717. He voted as a Tory, against the Administration. The 2nd Earl of Abingdon put him up unsuccessfully for the recordership of Oxford in 1721. He was returned unopposed as MP at Oxfordshire at the 1722 general election, but did not stand in 1727.

Jenkinson died of a consumption at Oxford on 2 July 1738. He and his wife had two sons and two daughters. He was succeeded in the baronetcy by his eldest son Robert, and then by his second son Banks.

Parliament of Great Britain
| Preceded by Sir Robert Jenkinson, Bt; James Herbert | Member of Parliament for Oxfordshire; 1717–1727; With: James Herbert 1717–1721; Henry Perrot 1721–1727 | Succeeded by Sir William Stapleton; Henry Perrot |
Baronetage of England
| Preceded by Robert Jenkinson | Baronet of Walcot and Hawkesbury; 1717–1738 | Succeeded by Robert Jenkinson |
