= Henry Perrot =

Henry Perrot (29 September 1689 – 6 January 1740), of Northleigh, Oxfordshire, was a British Tory politician who sat in the House of Commons from 1721 to 1740.

Perrot was the eldest son of James Perrot of Northleigh and his wife Anne. His father was nicknamed "Golden Perrot" because of his wealth. He came from a staunchly royalist family which had long connections with the University of Oxford. He married as his second wife on 2 April 1719, Martha Bouchier, daughter of Brereton Bouchier of Barnsley, Gloucestershire, and a niece of James Brydges, 1st Duke of Chandos. He succeeded his father in 1725.

Perrot was returned unopposed as a Tory Member of Parliament for Oxfordshire at a by-election on 17 May 1721. He was returned unopposed again at the general elections of 1722, 1727 and 1734. He voted consistently against the Administration, and became involved in Jacobite intrigues. In the winter of 1737, he went to the south of France, where he met the exiled Duke of Ormonde. In August 1738 at the meeting of the High Borlase Society in Oxford, he proposed authorizing the Duke of Ormonde to represent them at any foreign court, to obtain whatever help they thought necessary to achieve a Stuart restoration. In time the Society decided against such a course of action.

Perrot had been suffering from gout and died near Paris on 6 January 1740. He left Northleigh to his brother, Thomas, and the rest of his property to his two daughters.

Parliament of Great Britain
Preceded by Sir Banks Jenkinson; James Herbert	Member of Parliament for Oxfordshire; 1721–1740; With: Sir Banks Jenkinson; Sir William Stapleton; Sir James Dashwood	Succeeded by Sir James Dashwood; Viscount Quarendon
