= Francis Clerke (Oxfordshire MP) =

British Member of Parliament

Francis Clerke (c. 1655 – 2 May 1715) of North Weston, near Thame, Oxfordshire was a British Member of Parliament (MP) for Oxfordshire from 1710 to 1715.

He was the second son of Sir John Clerke, Bt., of Hitcham, Buckinghamshire and North Weston by Philadelphia, the daughter and coheiress of Sir Edward Carr of Hillingdon, Middlesex. He was educated at Magdalen College, Oxford, becoming a fellow in 1676–1682.

He married Catherine, the daughter of the Hon Henry Bertie (of Weston-on-the-Green), M.P., of Weston-on-the-Green, Oxfordshire. They had no children.

Parliament of Great Britain
Preceded by Sir Robert Jenkinson; Viscount Rialton	Member of Parliament for Oxfordshire; 1710–1715; With: Sir Robert Jenkinson	Succeeded by Sir Robert Jenkinson; James Herbert
