= Sir John Cope, 5th Baronet =

English Whig politician

Sir John Cope, 5th Baronet (19 November 1634 – 11 January 1721) was an English landowner, banker and Whig politician.

== Biography ==
Cope was the third but second surviving son of Sir John Cope, 3rd Baronet by his second wife, Lady Elizabeth Fane, daughter of Francis Fane, 1st Earl of Westmorland. From 1651 he was educated at The Queen's College, Oxford, before undertaking the Grand Tour to France, Italy, Germany and the Low Countries in 1654. In 1660 he was a lieutenant in the foot regiment of Viscount Falkland and was serving with the regiment in Dunkirk when it was sold to France in 1662. He was a captain of foot by 1667.

On 2 November 1672 he married Anne Booth, daughter of Philip Booth of Dunkirk. Cope's elder brother, Sir Anthony Cope, disapproved of the match and limited Cope to receiving only a life interest in the family estates, with much of the estate subsequently being inherited by a relative, Sir Jonathan Cope. Cope nonetheless became a considerable landowner in Oxfordshire on his brother's death 1675.

In 1679, Cope was elected as a Member of Parliament for Oxfordshire, holding the seat until 1681. He was a supporter of the Glorious Revolution in 1688 and used his extensive wealth to invest heavily in the new regime. He was appointed a deputy lieutenant for Oxfordshire in 1689 and that year was again to represent the county seat. He was defeated in the election of 1690, and again in 1698, despite the support of dissenters. In 1694 was among the founders of the Bank of England and was appointed a director of the bank. Cope was elected to represent Banbury in a by-election for the seat in 1699. He is recorded as having been a supporter of the Whig Junto in parliament, but he lost his seat in 1700. In 1718 he was appointed a justice of the peace for Banbury.

Cope died on 11 January 1721 and was succeeded in his title by his son, Sir John Cope, 6th Baronet of Hanwell.

Parliament of England
Preceded by Sir Francis Wenman, Bt; Edward Norreys	Member of Parliament for Oxfordshire; 1679–1681; With: Edward Norreys (1679); Thomas Horde (1679–1681)	Succeeded by Philip Harcourt; Thomas Horde
Preceded by Viscount Falkland; Thomas Tipping	Member of Parliament for Oxfordshire; 1689–1690; With: Sir Robert Jenkinson, Bt	Succeeded by Sir Robert Jenkinson, Bt; Lord Norreys
Preceded by James Isaacson	Member of Parliament for Banbury; 1699–1700	Succeeded by Patrick Friel
Baronetage of England
Preceded by Anthony Cope	Baronet (of Hanwell); 1675–1721	Succeeded by John Cope
