= Sir Anthony Cope, 4th Baronet =

English politician

Sir Anthony Cope, 4th Baronet (16 November 1632 – 11 June 1675) was an English natural philosopher, politician who sat in the House of Commons from 1660 to 1675.

Cope was the son of Sir John Cope, 3rd Baronet and his second wife Elizabeth Fane daughter of Francis Fane, 1st Earl of Westmorland. He succeeded to the baronetcy of Hanwell on the death of his father in 1638. His grandfather was Sir William Cope, 2nd Baronet of Hanwell.

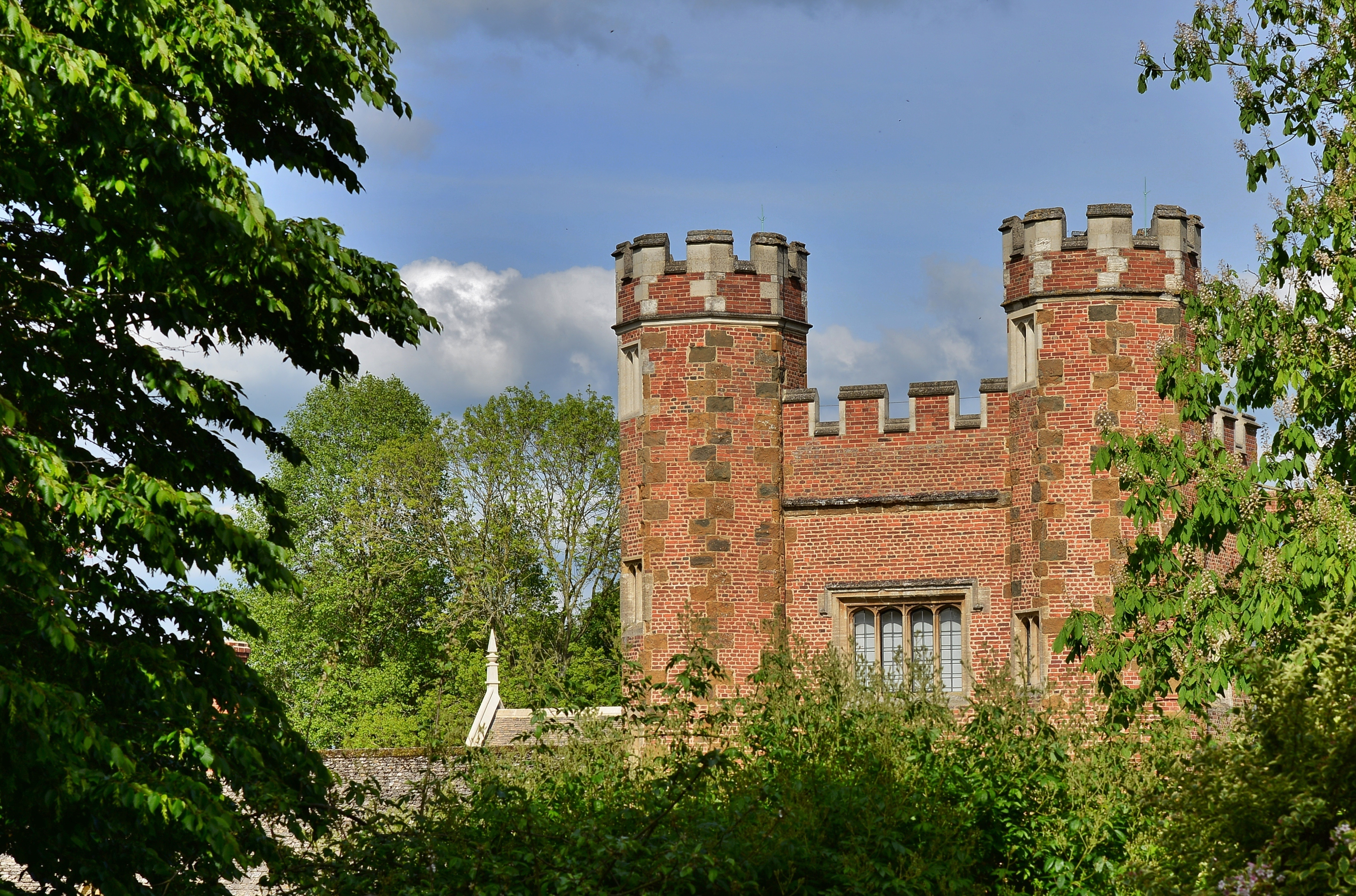
Hanwell Castle in Oxfordshire.

== Member of Parliament ==
In 1660, Cope was elected Member of Parliament for Banbury in the Convention Parliament. In 1661 he was elected MP for Oxfordshire in the Cavalier Parliament and sat until his death in 1675. In the same year, he was commissioned a captain in Viscount Falkland's Regiment of Foot, garrisoning Dunkirk. The city was sold and the regiment disbanded in 1662.

== Family ==
Cope married Mary Gerard, daughter of Dutton Gerard, 3rd Baron Gerard of Gerrard's Bromley. The couple had four children: three boys and one girl. The boys died at a young age.

Cope died at the age of 42.

The baronetcy passed to his brother Sir John Cope, 5th Baronet of Hanwell.

Parliament of England
Vacant Unrepresented in the Rump Parliament Title last held by Nathaniel Fiennes	Member of Parliament for Banbury; 1660–1661	Succeeded by John Holman
Preceded by Viscount Wenman; Hon. James Fiennes	Member of Parliament for Oxfordshire; 1661–1675; With: Viscount Falkland (1661–1663); William Knollys (1663–1664); Sir Francis Wenman (1664–1675)	Succeeded by Sir Francis Wenman; Sir Edward Norreys
Baronetage of England
Preceded by John Cope	Baronet (of Hanwell); 1638–1675	Succeeded by John Cope
