= Richard Brodrepp =

Member of the Parliament of England for Bridport
- In office 1689–1690

Personal details
- Born: 1639
- Died: 1707 (aged 67–68)
- Relations: John Trenchard (second cousin)
- Education: Christ's College, Cambridge

Richard Brodrepp or Bradrepp (1639 – 1707) was an English politician who served as a Member of Parliament (MP) for Bridport.

== Biography ==
Brodrepp was a second cousin of John Trenchard. In the 1660s he rebuilt Mapperton House.

== See also ==
- List of MPs elected to the English Parliament in 1689
