= Matthew Skinner =

English serjeant-at-law, judge and politician

Matthew Skinner (22 October 1689 – 21 October 1749) was an English serjeant-at-law, judge and politician who sat in the House of Commons from 1734 to 1738.

== Life ==
A great-grandson of Bishop Robert Skinner, Skinner was born on 22 October 1689, the third and youngest son of Robert Skinner of Welton, Northamptonshire, and of the Inner Temple. His father was judge of the Marshalsea court, and law reporter. Skinner entered Westminster School at the age of 14. Elected to a studentship at Christ Church, Oxford, he matriculated on 18 June 1709, and entered Lincoln's Inn on 20 June 1709.

Skinner was called to the bar on 21 April 1716, and joined the Oxford circuit. In 1719 he purchased from Simon Urling (later recorder of London), a place as one of the four common pleaders of the city of London, who then enjoyed the exclusive right and privilege of practising in the lord mayor's court. He was chosen as recorder of Oxford on 30 May 1721 and gave up his place as common pleader in 1722 to Thomas Garrard (later common serjeant of London).

Skinner's practice grew rapidly, and he was called to the rank of serjeant-at-law in Easter term, 1 February 1724, was made one of the king's serjeants on 11 June 1728, and became his majesty's prime (or first) serjeant by letters patent on 12 May 1734. He served as treasurer of Serjeants' Inn in 1728.

After trying unsuccessfully to enter parliament for Andover at the 1727 British general election, Skinner, who lived at Oxford from 1722 to 1739, was chosen Member of Parliament for the Oxford constituency at the general election of 1734. He was chosen as a Tory, but he soon went over to the Government. On 16 May 1737, he spoke in favour of the bill against the provost and city of Edinburgh after the Porteous riots.

Skinner was appointed chief justice of Chester, and of the great sessions for the counties of Flint, Denbigh, and Montgomery and vacated his seat in Parliament on 26 November 1738. He occupied this judicial position, together with the recordership of Oxford, for the rest of his life. He was the second counsel for the Crown in the prosecution of Jacobite rebels on the northern circuit in July 1746; and led for the crown at Arthur Elphinstone, 6th Lord Balmerinoch's trial in the House of Lords the same year.

Skinner died at Oxford on 21 October 1749, and was buried in Oxford Cathedral.

== Works ==
Skinner published his father's Reports of Cases decided in the Court of King's Bench, 33 Charles II to 9 William III in 1728.

== Family ==
Skinner married, in 1719, Elizabeth, daughter of Thomas Whitfield of Watford Place, Hertfordshire. His eldest son died on 8 April 1735; while another son, Matthew Skinner, was also a barrister of Lincoln's Inn.

== Notes ==
Attribution

This article incorporates text from a publication now in the public domain: Lee, Sidney, ed. (1897). "Skinner, Matthew". Dictionary of National Biography. Vol. 52. London: Smith, Elder & Co.

Parliament of Great Britain
Preceded by Thomas Rowney, junior Francis Knollys	Member of Parliament for Oxford; 1734 – 1738; With: Thomas Rowney, junior	Succeeded by Thomas Rowney, junior James Herbert
