= Sir William Stapleton, 4th Baronet =

Sir William Stapleton, 4th Baronet (c. 1698 – 1740), of Rotherfield Greys, Oxfordshire, was an English Jacobite and Tory politician who sat in the House of Commons from 1727 to 1740.

== Early life ==
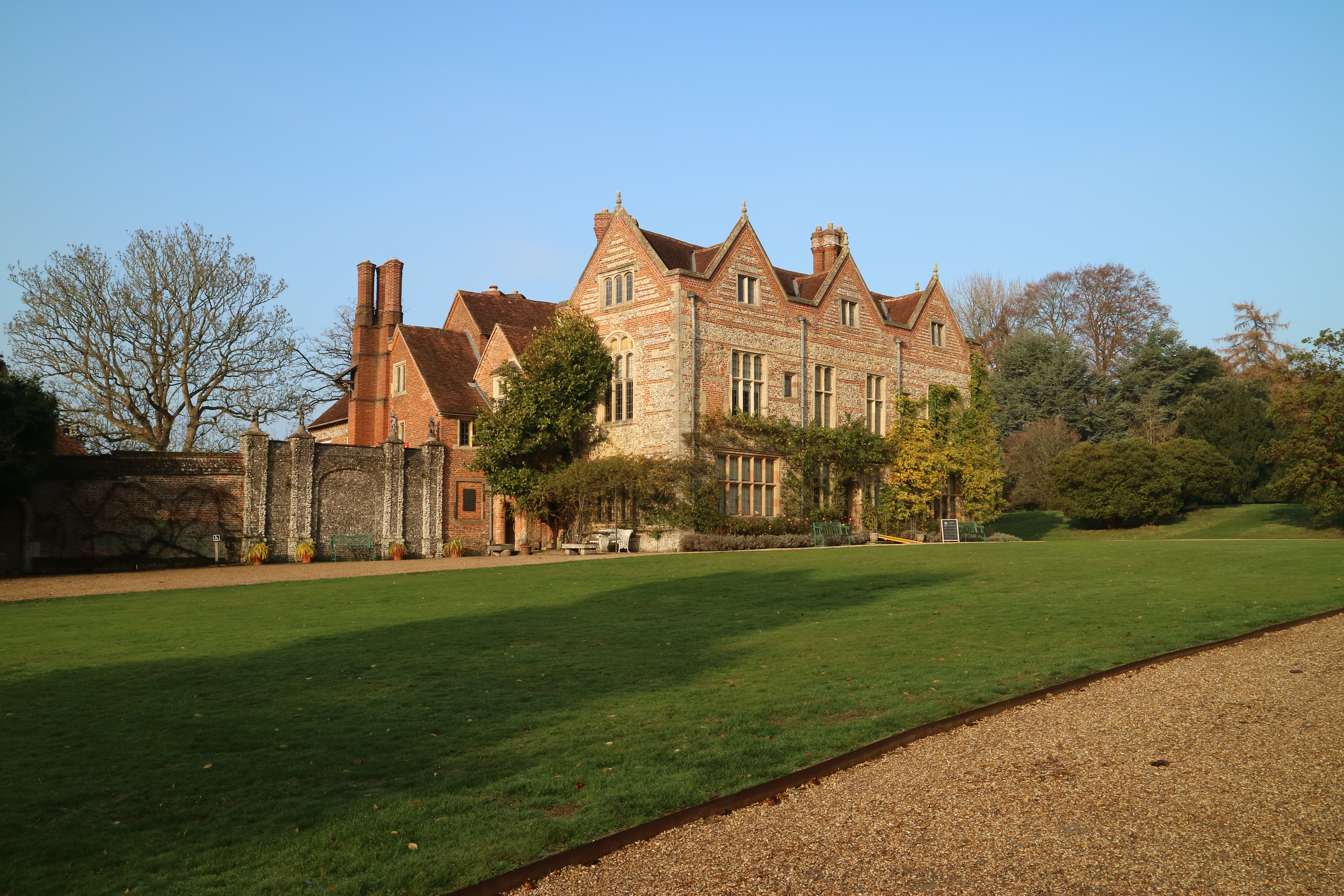
Greys Court, Oxfordshire (2018).

Stapleton was brought up on Nevis in the British Leeward Islands, the son of Sir William Stapleton, 3rd Baronet and his wife Frances Russell, daughter of Sir James Russell who had acted as governor of the island. In 1699, he succeeded to the baronetcy on the death of his father. He matriculated at Christ Church, Oxford on 17 April 1714, aged 15. He married Catherine Paul, co-heiress daughter of William Paul of Braywick, Bray, Berkshire and his wife Lady Catherine Fane, daughter of Vere Fane, 4th Earl of Westmorland on 28 April 1724. With the marriage he came into possession of Greys Court.

== Career ==
In the 1720s Stapleton associated with Jacobites including Philip Wharton, 1st Duke of Wharton. At the general election of 1727 he was returned unopposed as Member of Parliament for Oxfordshire. He voted against the Administration in every recorded division. He spoke on a bill for the relief of the sugar colonies on 21 February 1733, and successfully opposed the import of rum from the North American colonies into Ireland as detrimental to the sugar colonies. He was involved in the drafting of the Molasses Act. He was returned unopposed again at the 1734 British general election. Linda Colley characterises him as an "inarticulate" Tory of the Country Party.

== Death and legacy ==
Stapleton died at Bath on 12 January 1740. He and his wife had three sons and two daughters. She remarried to Rev. Matthew Dutton and died in 1753 He was succeeded in the baronetcy by his second son Thomas. His eldest son Lt. William Stapleton was killed on board HMS Isis at Port Royal, Jamaica. His daughter Catherine married Sir James Wright, HM Resident Minister in Venice.

== Notes ==
Parliament of Great Britain
| Preceded by Sir Banks Jenkinson, Bt; Henry Perrot | Member of Parliament for Oxfordshire; 1727–1740; With: Henry Perrot | Succeeded by Sir James Dashwood, Bt; Henry Perrot |
Baronetage of England
| Preceded by William Stapleton | Baronet of The Leeward Islands); 1699–1740 | Succeeded by Thomas Stapleton |
