= Sir John Walter, 3rd Baronet =

English Member of Parliament (died 1722)

Sir John Walter, 3rd Baronet (c. 1674–1722) of Sarsden House, Oxfordshire was a British Tory politician who sat in the English House of Commons between 1694 and 1707 and in the British House of Commons from 1708 to 1722.

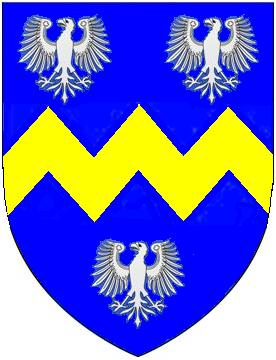
Arms of Walter of Sarsden: Azure, a fesse indented or between three eagles displayed argent

== Biography ==
Walter was the eldest surviving son of Sir William Walter, 2nd Baronet and his first wife Mary Tufton, daughter of John Tufton, 2nd Earl of Thanet. He matriculated at Queen's College, Oxford, on 21 August 1691. On 5 March 1694 he succeeded his father to the estates and the baronetcy. He married. Elizabeth Vernon, daughter of Sir Thomas Vernon merchant and MP of London in about 1700.

Walter was returned as Member of Parliament for Appleby at a by-election on 13 December 1694 on the interest of his uncle Thomas Tufton, 6th Earl of Thanet. He did not stand at the 1695 English general election but was returned again for Appleby at a by-election on 23 December 1697 and then at the 1698 English general election. He was defeated at Appleby at the first general election of 1701 and did not stand there again. He stood unsuccessfully at Woodstock at the 1705 English general election and was elected MP for Oxford at a by-election on 11 December 1706. He was returned unopposed there at the 1708 British general election. He was one of a group of wine-bibbing Tories who came together under the Duke of Beaufort's lead in July 1709 to establish the 'Board of Brothers'. He was a High Church supporter of Dr Sacheverell, and voted against his impeachment early in 1710. At the 1710 British general election he was returned again for Oxford, and was listed as a ‘worthy patriot’ who assisted in exposing the mismanagements of the previous Whig administration, and in 1711 as a ‘Tory patriot’ opposed to the continuance of war. In 1711 he was appointed Clerk of the Green Cloth and held the post until 1714. He was returned unopposed for Oxford again at the 1713 British general election. He was returned unopposed as a Tory for Oxford in 1715 and 1722. He voted against the Administration in every recorded division

== Private life ==
Walter was a bon viveur who enjoyed drinking (particularly fine French wines), smart fashion, gambling and horse racing and was a popular socialite. His friend Jonathan Swift described him as ”an honest drunken fellow”. However his extravagance forced him to sell off property to pay his debts. He sold Godstow to the Earl of Abingdon in 1702, most of Cutteslowe to William Breach in 1703, and the remainder of Cutteslowe and Wolvercote to the Duke of Marlborough in 1710.

Walter died on 11 June 1722 and was buried at Sarsden. His marriage had been childless and he was succeeded in the baronetcy by his half-brother Robert. He left the Sarsden estate to his wife with reversion to Robert upon her death. He also left £1,000 to his friend Lord Harcourt who in 1724 married Walter's widow. The baronetcy became extinct in 1731 when Sir Robert died childless, and the estate then became caught up in a protracted Chancery suit.

Parliament of England
Preceded by Hon. Charles Boyle; William Cheyne	Member of Parliament for Appleby; 1694–1695; With: William Cheyne	Succeeded by Sir William Twysden; Sir Christopher Musgrave
Preceded by Sir William Twysden; Sir Christopher Musgrave	Member of Parliament for Appleby; 1697–1700; With: Sir Christopher Musgrave1697-1698; Gervase Pierrepont 1698-1700	Succeeded by Wharton Dunch; Gervase Pierrepont
Preceded by Thomas Rowney; Francis Norreys	Member of Parliament for Oxford; 1706–1708; With: Thomas Rowney	Succeeded by Parliament of Great Britain
Parliament of Great Britain
Preceded by Parliament of England	Member of Parliament for Oxford; 1708–1722; With: Thomas Rowney 1708-1722; Thomas Rowney, junior 1722	Succeeded by Thomas Rowney, junior Francis Knollys
Baronetage of England
Preceded by William Walter	Baronet (of Sarsden); 1694-1722	Succeeded by Robert Walter
