= Jenkinson baronets =

Title in the Baronetage of England

There have been two baronetcies created for people with the surname Jenkinson, both in the Baronetage of England. The seventh holder of the first creation was elevated to the peerage as Earl of Liverpool in 1796, a title which became extinct in 1851.

The first Jenkinson baronetcy, of Walcot in the County of Oxford and of Hawkesbury in the County of Gloucester, was created on 18 May 1661 for Robert Jenkinson. He had earlier represented Oxfordshire in Parliament. His son, the second Baronet, and grandsons, the third and fourth Baronet, also represented this constituency in the House of Commons. The seventh Baronet (the son of Charles Jenkinson, younger son of the second Baronet) was a prominent politician and notably served as President of the Board of Trade and as Chancellor of the Duchy of Lancaster. In 1786 he was created Baron Hawkesbury, of Hawkesbury in the County of Gloucester, in the Peerage of Great Britain, and in 1796 he was further honoured when he was made Earl of Liverpool, also in the Peerage of Great Britain.

His eldest son, the second Earl, was Prime Minister of the United Kingdom from 1812 to 1827. He was succeeded by his half-brother, the third Earl, who notably held office as Lord Steward of the Household from 1841 to 1846. On his death the barony and earldom became extinct. The titles were revived in 1893 and 1905 respectively for his grandson Cecil Foljambe (the son of his daughter Selina Charlotte; see the Earl of Liverpool). The Jenkinson baronetcy passed to the late Earl's first cousin, the tenth Baronet. He represented Dover in the House of Commons. On his death the title passed to his nephew, the eleventh Baronet, the son of the Rt Revd John Jenkinson, Bishop of St David's. He sat as a Conservative Member of Parliament for Wiltshire North. The family seat is Hawkesbury near Badminton in Gloucestershire.

The second Jenkinson baronetcy, of Walton Hall, Chesterfield, in the County of Derby, was created on 17 December 1685 for Paul Jenkinson, who was High Sheriff of Derbyshire in 1687. The title became extinct on the death of the third Baronet in 1739.

== Jenkinson baronets, of Walcot and Hawkesbury (1661) ==
- Sir Robert Jenkinson, 1st Baronet (c. 1621 – 1677)
- Sir Robert Jenkinson, 2nd Baronet (c. 1654 – 1710)
- Sir Robert Jenkinson, 3rd Baronet (1685–1717)
- Sir Banks Jenkinson, 4th Baronet (1687–1738)
- Sir Robert Jenkinson, 5th Baronet (1720–1766)
- Sir Banks Jenkinson, 6th Baronet (1721–1790)
- Sir Charles Jenkinson, 7th Baronet (1729–1808) (created Baron Hawkesbury in 1786)

=== Baron Hawkesbury (1786) ===
- Charles Jenkinson, 1st Baron Hawkesbury (1729–1808) (created Earl of Liverpool in 1796)

=== Earl of Liverpool (1796) ===
- Charles Jenkinson, 1st Earl of Liverpool (1729–1808)
- Robert Jenkinson, 2nd Earl of Liverpool (1770–1828), Prime Minister of the United Kingdom 1812–1827
- Charles Jenkinson, 3rd Earl of Liverpool (1784–1851)

=== Jenkinson baronets, of Walcot and Hawkesbury (1661; reverted) ===
- Sir Charles Jenkinson, 10th Baronet (1779–1855)
- Sir George Jenkinson, 11th Baronet (1817–1892)
- Sir George Jenkinson, 12th Baronet (1851–1915)
  - Capt. John Jenkinson (1881–1914)
- Sir Anthony Jenkinson, 13th Baronet (1912–1989)
- Sir John Banks Jenkinson, 14th Baronet (born 1945)

The heir apparent to the baronetcy is the 14th Baronet's son, George Jenkinson (born 1980).

=== Title succession chart ===
Title succession chart, Jenkinson baronets and Earls of Liverpool (first creation).

Sir Robert Jenkinson; 1st Baronet c. 1621 – 1677
Sir Robert Jenkinson; 2nd Baronet c. 1654 – 1710
Sir Robert Jenkinson; 3rd Baronet; 1685–1717	Sir Banks Jenkinson; 4th Baronet; 1687–1738	Col. Charles Jenkinson; 1693–1750
Baron Hawkesbury (1786, GB); Viscount Hawkesbury; Earl of Liverpool (1796, GB)
Sir Robert Jenkinson; 5th Baronet; 1720–1766	Sir Banks Jenkinson; 6th Baronet; 1721–1790	Charles Jenkinson; 1st Earl of Liverpool; 7th Baronet; 1729–1808	Col. John Jenkinson died 1805
Robert Jenkinson; 2nd Earl of Liverpool; 8th Baronet; 1770–1828; Prime Minister of the United Kingdom; 1812–1827	Charles Jenkinson; 3rd Earl of Liverpool; 9th Baronet; 1784–1851	Sir Charles Jenkinson; 10th Baronet; 1779–1855	Rt Rev. John Jenkinson; 1781–1840
Barony, viscountcy and earldom extinct
Sir George Jenkinson; 11th Baronet; 1817–1892
Sir George Jenkinson; 12th Baronet; 1851–1915
Capt. John Jenkinson; 1881–1914
Sir Anthony Jenkinson; 13th Baronet; 1912–1989
Sir John Jenkinson; 14th Baronet born 1945
George Jenkinson born 1980

== Jenkinson baronets, of Walton (1685) ==
Escutcheon of the Jenkinson baronets of Walton

- Sir Paul Jenkinson, 1st Baronet (died 1714)
- Sir Paul Jenkinson, 2nd Baronet (died 1722)
- Sir Jonathan Jenkinson, 3rd Baronet (died 1739)

== See also ==
- Earl of Liverpool
