= Francis Norreys (1666–1706) =

English Tory Member of Parliament for Oxford

Francis Norreys (c.1666 – 6 June 1706) was an English Tory politician.

== Biography ==
Norreys was the second son of Sir Edward Norreys. He was educated at The Queen's College, Oxford before entering Lincoln's Inn in 1684. In 1685 he is recorded as the cornet of a troop of horse and in 1687 he was made a freeman and bailiff of Oxford.

In 1701 he was elected unopposed as the Member of Parliament for Oxford in succession to his father, likely on the interest of his kinsman Lord Norreys. He was soon identified as an opponent of the Whig government and opposed the preparations for war with France in the 1701 parliamentary session. He was returned unopposed in 1702 and continued to vote with the Tories, including in support of the Earl of Nottingham. In the 1705 election he defended his seat with ease against Whig opposition and in an analysis of the new Parliament he was again identified as a Tory.

Norreys died unmarried on 6 June 1706, while still an MP and predeceasing his father, and was buried at Weston-on-the-Green.

Parliament of England
Preceded by Thomas Rowney; Sir Edward Norreys	Member of Parliament for Oxford; 1701–1706; With: Thomas Rowney	Succeeded by Thomas Rowney; Sir John Walter, Bt
