= James Dashwood =

British politician

Sir James Dashwood Bt
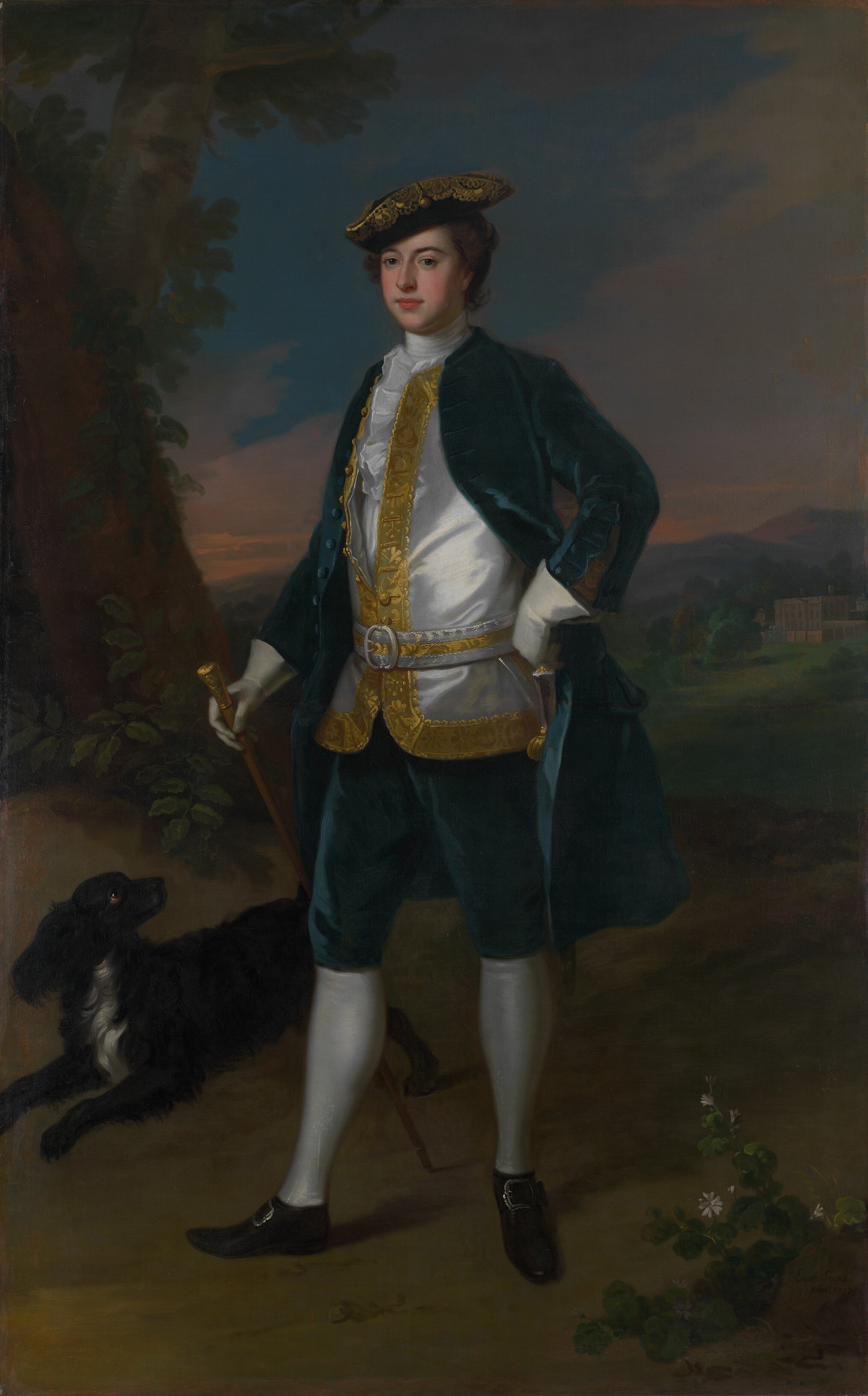
- Portrait by Enoch Seeman, 1737
- Born: 1715; Kirtlington, Oxfordshire
- Died: 10 November 1779 (aged 63–64); Kirtlington, Oxfordshire

Sir James Dashwood, 2nd Baronet (1715 – 10 November 1779) was a British Tory politician who sat in the House of Commons from 1740 to 1768.

== Early life ==
He was the son of Robert Dashwood, and his grandfather from whom he inherited the baronetcy was Sir Robert Dashwood, 1st Baronet; his mother was Dorothy Reade, daughter of Sir James Reade, 2nd Baronet. He was educated at John Roysse's Free School in Abingdon (now Abingdon School). He was a Steward of the OA Club in 1746.

== Kirtlington Park ==
He inherited large estates in Oxfordshire, being on a Grand Tour when he came into them in 1734, and built an imposing house at Kirtlington.

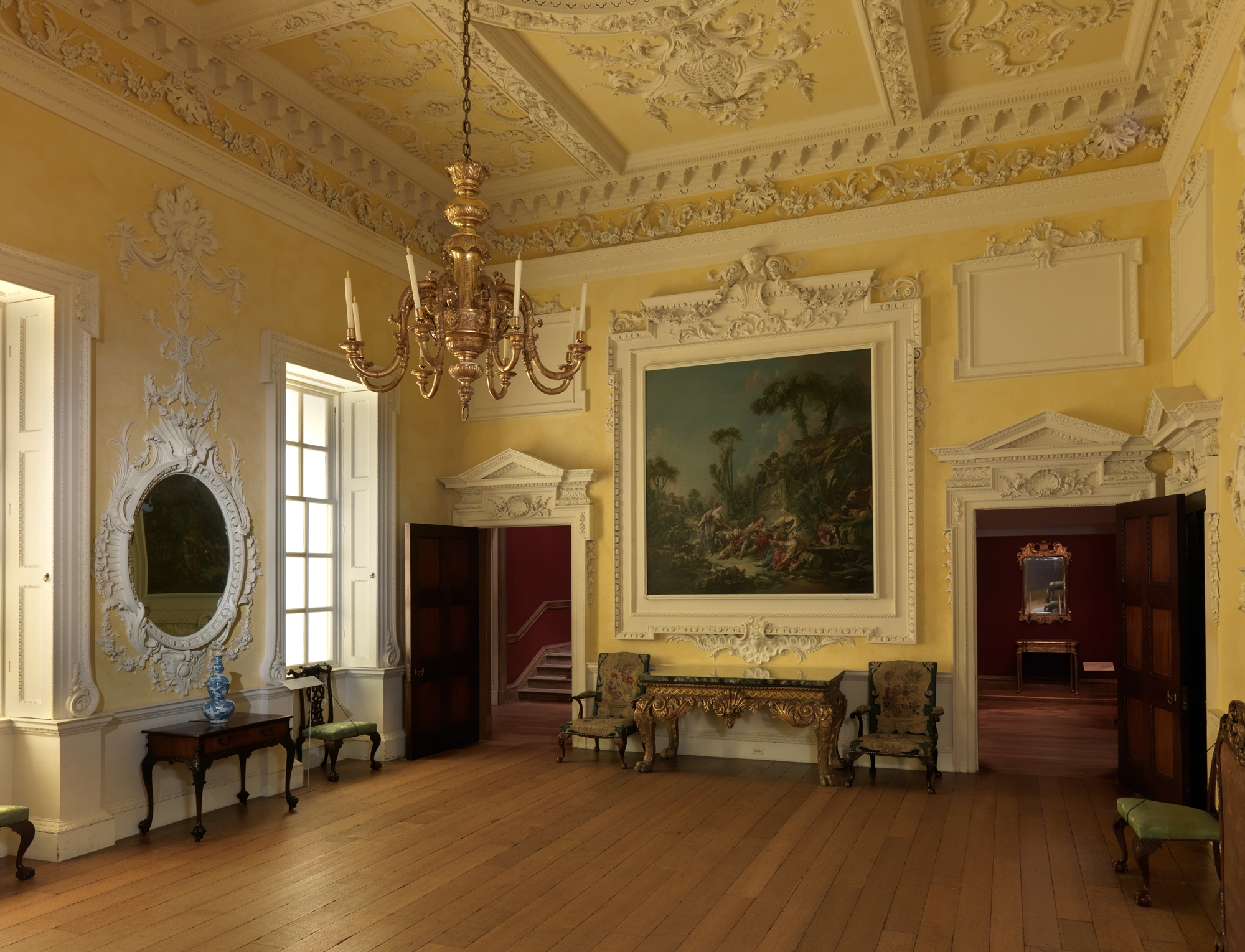
Dining room from Kirtlington Park MET

Kirtlington Park was constructed in the years 1742 to 1746, by William Smith of Warwick and John Sanderson, starting from plans by James Gibbs; the grounds were laid out by Lancelot Brown. Dashwood also built up a significant library, and in 1747 was paying James Lovell, the sculptor and interior decorator. In 1931 the rococo dining room was exported, and it is now in the Metropolitan Museum of Art. Involved in it were Thomas Roberts (plasterwork), and either Henry Cheere or John Cheere (chimneypiece).

Brown was at work on Kirtlington Park from the end of 1751 to 1757. This was a second phase of work in which the old house, Northbrook House, was demolished in 1750, and previous garden work by Thomas Greening was altered.

== Views ==
Dashwood in local politics represented what was called the "old interest", and in national politics was a Jacobite, and someone prepared to work against Catholic disabilities. Scottish fir trees at Kirtington demonstrated his politics. He belonged to the Loyal Brotherhood, a Tory drinking club that also served as a London focus for party organisation, with other local MPs. At the time of the 1745 Jacobite Rebellion he was one of a group of Oxfordshire Tories who refused to join the county association.

In 1749 the Earl of Egmont made a survey of MPs for the Prince of Wales, finding Dashwood a "strongly tainted" Jacobite. The Old Interest locally held drinking club sessions at which the Young Pretender was lauded, into the 1750s. At this period Tory political planning was low key, in meetings that resembled social events: one such dinner was held at Dashwood's house on 29 February 1756, at which voting rights were discussed. He was awarded an honorary D.C.L. by the University of Oxford, and the city made him High Steward.

== In politics ==
In 1738 Dashwood was High Sheriff of Oxfordshire. He became Tory Member of Parliament for Oxfordshire, unopposed, in 1740 on the death of Sir William Stapleton, 4th Baronet, standing again in 1741. He moved swiftly to call for the repeal of the Jewish Naturalization Act 1753 in October of the year of its passing (he had not previously made a speech on the House, and had not prepared the ground for this one); he also at that period spoke against the Plantation Act 1740.

The general election of 1754 saw confusion reign in Oxfordshire. Dashwood at this time faced serious political opposition, from Lady Susanna Keck at Great Tew as well as the Whig candidates. In the end four members were returned for the two-man constituency. In the subsequent legal proceedings, Dashwood and his Tory colleague Viscount Wenman were ousted, despite advice from distinguished lawyers including Roger Newdigate and William Blackstone.

In 1761 a Tory–Whig deal was struck locally with the Duke of Marlborough, and Dashwood returned to Parliament once more, unopposed. He was not an active member, though he took a serious interest in enclosure bills, and retired from politics in 1768.

== Family ==
Dashwood married on 17 February 1739 Elizabeth Spencer, daughter of Edward Spencer of Rendlesham. They had three sons and three daughters.

The eldest son, Henry Watkin, inherited the baronetcy. Of the other children:

- Elizabeth, the eldest daughter, married George Montagu, 4th Duke of Manchester
- Anne married John Stewart, 7th Earl of Galloway in 1764, as his second wife, and they had 16 children
- The third daughter, Catherine, married Lucy Knightley, MP for Northamptonshire
- The second son was Thomas, who went to India and married Charlotte Auriol, daughter of James Auriol. His son of the same name Thomas John joined the Bengal Civil Service, and in 1822 married Susan Wodehouse, daughter of Thomas Wodehouse the barrister.

== See also ==
- List of Old Abingdonians

== Notes ==
Parliament of Great Britain
Preceded by Sir William Stapleton, Bt; Henry Perrot	Member of Parliament for Oxfordshire; 1740–1754; With: Henry Perrot to February 1740; Viscount Quarendon February 1740 – 1743; Norreys Bertie 1743–54	Succeeded by Viscount Parker; Sir Edward Turner, Bt
Preceded by Viscount Parker; Sir Edward Turner, Bt	Member of Parliament for Oxfordshire; 1761–1768; With: Lord Charles Spencer	Succeeded by Lord Charles Spencer; The Viscount Wenman
Baronetage of England
Preceded by Robert Dashwood	Baronet (of Kirtlington); 1734–1779	Succeeded by Henry Dashwood
