= Philip Wenman, 7th Viscount Wenman =

British landowner and politician

Philip Wenman, 7th Viscount Wenman (18 April 1742 – 26 March 1800), styled The Honourable Philip Wenman until 1760, was a British landowner and politician who sat in the House of Commons from 1768 to 1796.

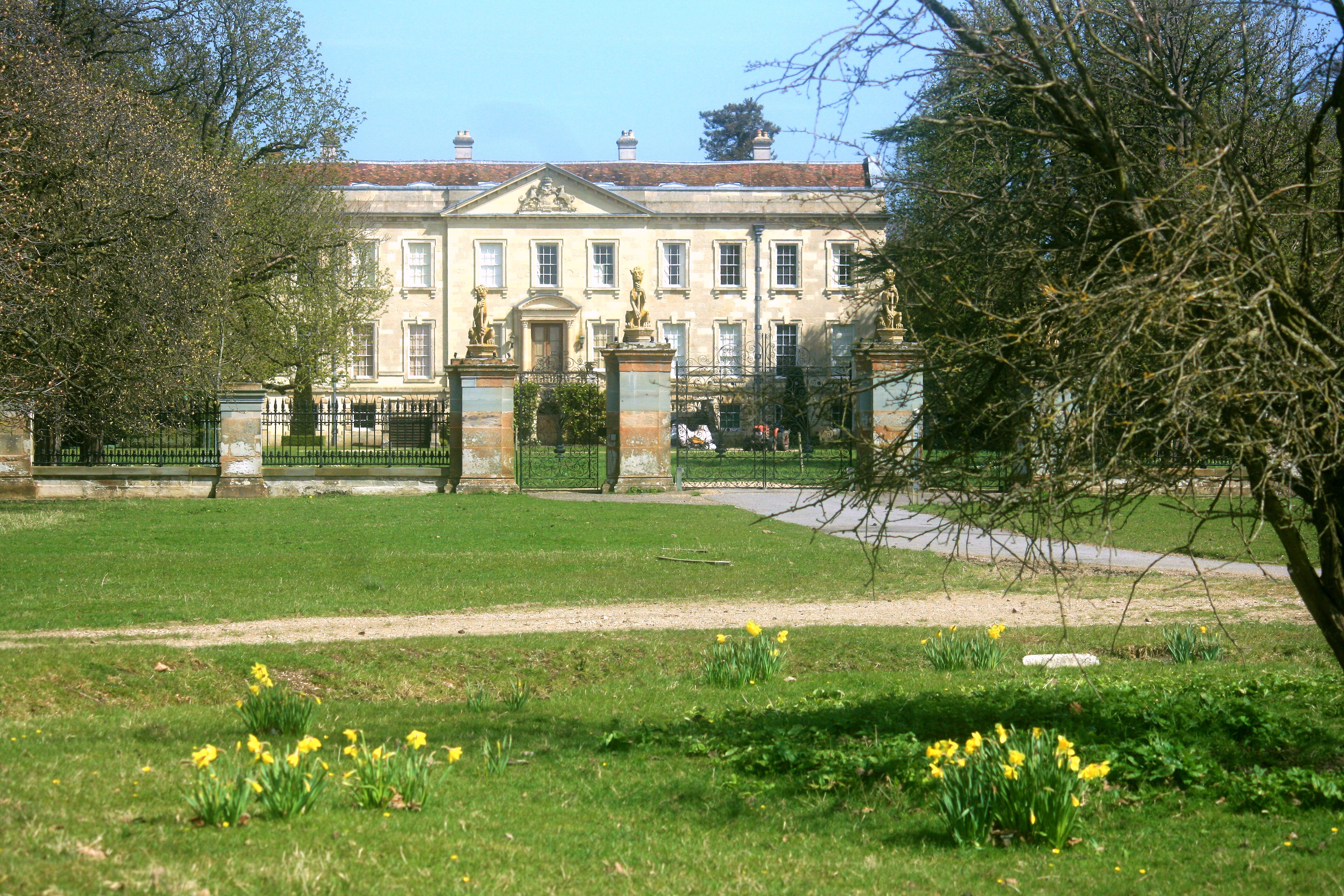
Thame Park, Oxfordshire

== Biography ==
Wenman was the son of Philip Wenman, 6th Viscount Wenman, by Sophia, eldest daughter and co-heir of James Herbert, of Tythorpe, Oxfordshire. Thomas Wenman was his younger brother. In February, 1760 he matriculated at Oriel College, Oxford.

In August 1760, aged 18, he succeeded in the viscountcy and to Thame Park on the early death of his father.

The viscountcy was an Irish peerage and did not entitle him to a seat in the English House of Lords. In 1768 he was instead returned to the British House of Commons as a Knight of the Shire for Oxfordshire, a seat he held for the next 28 years.

Lord Wenman married Lady Eleanor, fifth daughter of Willoughby Bertie, 3rd Earl of Abingdon, in 1766. He died in March 1800, aged 57, when the viscountcy became extinct. Thame Park passed to his ten-year-old niece Sophia Wykeham, later created the 1st (and last) Baroness Wenman, who took up residence there.

Parliament of Great Britain
Preceded by Lord Charles Spencer; Sir James Dashwood, Bt	Member of Parliament for Oxfordshire; 1768–1796; With: Lord Charles Spencer 1768–1790; Marquess of Blandford 1790–1796	Succeeded by Lord Charles Spencer; John Fane
Peerage of Ireland
Preceded by Philip Wenman	Viscount Wenman; 1760–1800	Extinct
