= Sir Robert Jenkinson, 3rd Baronet =

British landowner and Tory politician

Sir Robert Jenkinson, 3rd Baronet (23 November 1685 – 29 October 1717), of Walcot, Charlbury, Oxfordshire, and Hawkesbury, Gloucestershire, was a British landowner and Tory politician who sat in the House of Commons from 1710 to 1717.

== Biography ==
Jenkinson was the eldest son of Sir Robert Jenkinson, 2nd Baronet, and his wife Sarah Tomlins, daughter of Thomas Tomlins of Bromley, Middlesex, and was baptised on 23 November 1785. He matriculated at Trinity College, Oxford, on 18 February 1703 In 1705, he was admitted at Lincoln's Inn. He succeeded his father in the baronetcy on 30 January 1710. He married by licence dated 4 February 1712, Henrietta Maria Scarborough, daughter of Charles Scarborough.

Jenkinson succeeded his father as Tory Member of Parliament for Oxfordshire at a closely contested by-election on 22 February 1710. He voted against the impeachment of Dr Sacheverell, and on 3 May 1710 presented his county's loyal address to the Queen. He took a leading part in entertaining Sacheverell during his progress through Oxfordshire in July, dining him at Walcot on 19 July. Jenkinson was returned unopposed at the 1710 British general election. He was listed as a 'worthy patriot' who detected the mismanagements of the previous administration, and as a 'Tory patriot' who opposed the continuation of the war in 1711. He was a member of the October Club. He was returned again at the 1713 but then played little part in Parliament. and 1715.

Jenkinson died of a fever on 29 October 1717, and was buried at Charlbury. He had no children and was succeeded in the baronetcy by his brother Banks. His widow married Charles Eversfield in 1731.

Parliament of Great Britain
Preceded by Sir Robert Jenkinson, 2nd Bt; Viscount Rialton	Member of Parliament for Oxfordshire; 1710–1727; With: Viscount Rialton 1710; Francis Clerke 1710–1715; James Herbert 1715–1717	Succeeded by Sir Banks Jenkinson, Bt; James Herbert
Baronetage of England
Preceded by Robert Jenkinson	Baronet of Walcot and Hawkesbury; 1710–1717	Succeeded by Banks Jenkinson
