= Thomas Rowney (died 1759) =

18th century English MP

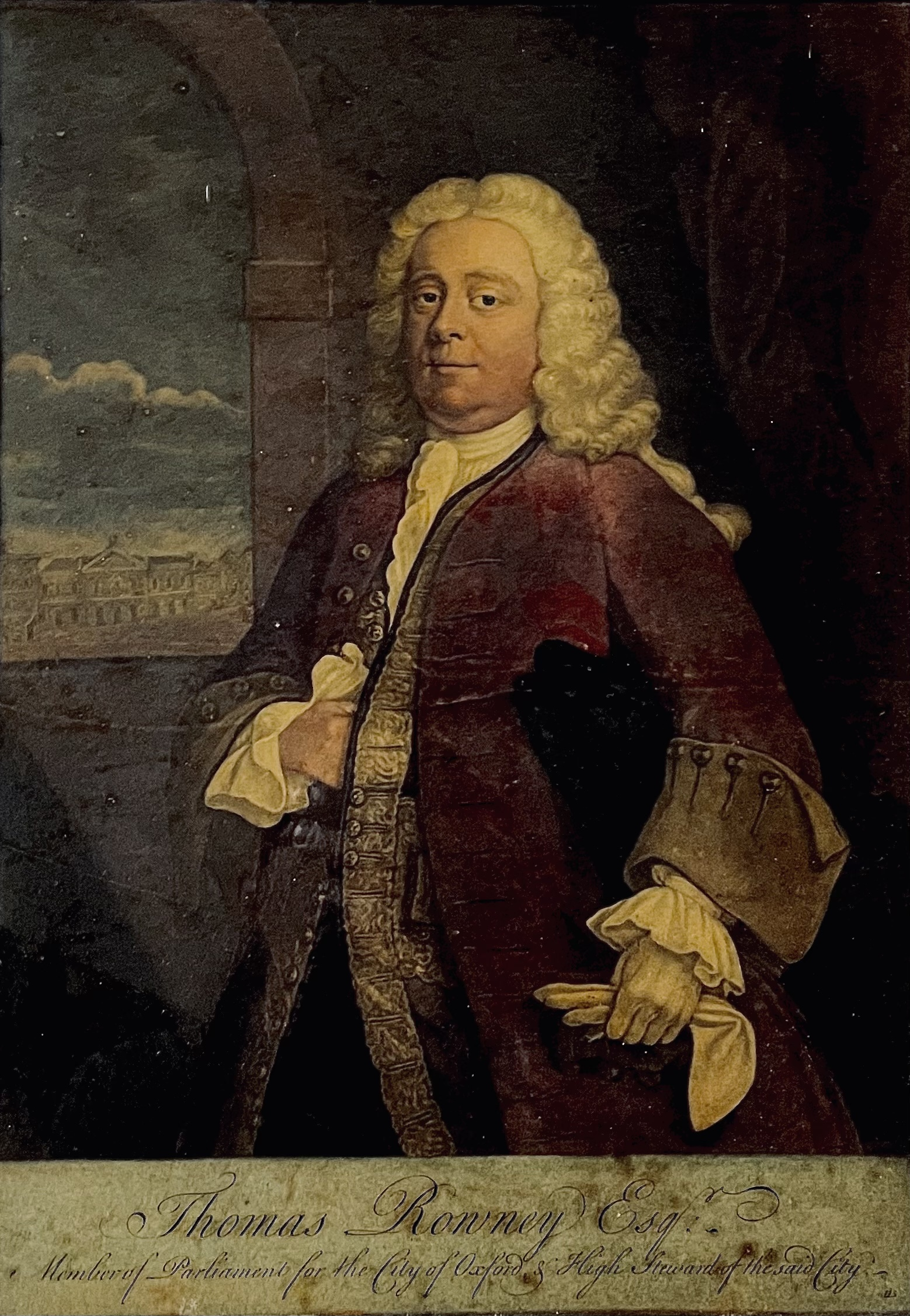
Reverse glass mezzotint of Thomas Rowney Esq. Member of Parliament for Oxford

Thomas Rowney (c. 1693–1759) of Dean Farm, Oxfordshire, was a British Tory politician who sat in the House of Commons for 37 years from 1722 to 1759.

== Early life ==
Rowney was the son of Thomas Rowney and his wife Elizabeth Noel, daughter of Edward Noel of St. Clement Danes, London. His father represented Oxford from 1695 to 1722. He was possibly educated at Eton College from 1706 to 1707 and matriculated at St John's College, Oxford on. 5 July 1709, aged 16. He was also admitted at Inner Temple in 1709.

== Career ==
At the 1722 general election, Rowney succeeded his father at Oxford as a Tory Member of Parliament for Oxford. He voted against the Administration on every recorded occasion. He was returned unopposed as MP for Oxford at the general elections of 1727, 1734 and 1741. In 1743 he was appointed High Steward of Oxford in 1743 for the rest of his life. A member of the High Tory Loyal Brotherhood, during the 1745 rebellion, he refused to join the county association in defence of the Hanoverian succession.He was a board member of the High Tory Loyal Brotherhood. He was returned unopposed again at the 1747. Rowney's father been instrumental in the rebuilding of Oxford Town Hall, and Rowney saw its completion in 1751. He was returned unopposed again as MP for Oxford at the 1754 general election. There is no record of his speaking or voting in this Parliament.

== Personal life ==
Rowney married Miss Trollope on 10 March 1756.

He died on 27 October 1759.

Parliament of Great Britain
Preceded by Thomas Rowney; Sir John Walter	Member of Parliament for Oxford; 1722–1759; With: Sir John Walter 1722; Francis Knollys 1722; Matthew Skinner 1734; James Herbert 1739; Philip Herbert 1740; Philip Wenman 1749; Hon. Robert Lee 1754	Succeeded by Sir Thomas Stapleton; Hon. Robert Lee
