= Philip Wenman, 6th Viscount Wenman =

British landowner and politician

Member of Parliament for Oxford with Thomas Rowney
- In office 1749–1754
- Preceded by: Thomas Rowney; Philip Herbert
- Succeeded by: Thomas Rowney; Hon. Robert Lee

Personal details
- Born: 23 November 1719
- Died: 16 August 1760 (aged 40)
- Education: Oriel College, Oxford

Philip Wenman, 6th Viscount Wenman (23 November 1719 – 16 August 1760), was a British landowner and politician.

He was the elder son of Richard Wenman, 5th Viscount Wenman, and Susanna Wenman (née Wroughton, daughter of Seymour Wroughton of Heskett).

He succeeded his father in the viscountcy in 1729, aged eleven. As the viscountcy was an Irish title, it did not entitle him to a seat in the English House of Lords.

== Education ==
Lord Wenman was educated at Roysse's School (from 1731–1737) and Oriel College, Oxford. He was a Steward of the OA Club in 1744.

== Career ==
In 1749, Wenman was returned to the House of Commons for the city of Oxford, a seat he held until 1754.

In 1754, he was returned as a Tory for the county of Oxfordshire in a bitterly contested election. However, there was a double return and, on 23 April 1755, Whig candidates Lord Parker and Sir Edward Turner were declared elected in favour of Wenman and Sir James Dashwood.

== Family ==
Lord Wenman married Sophia, eldest daughter and co-heir of James Herbert, of Tythorpe, Oxfordshire, in 1741. They had four sons and three daughters. Their second son was Thomas Wenman. Wenman died in August 1760, aged 40, and was succeeded in the viscountcy by his eldest son, Philip.

== See also ==
- List of Old Abingdonians

Parliament of Great Britain
| Preceded by Thomas Rowney; Philip Herbert | Member of Parliament for Oxford; 1749–1754; With: Thomas Rowney | Succeeded by Thomas Rowney; Hon. Robert Lee |
Peerage of Ireland
| Preceded by Richard Wenman | Viscount Wenman; 1729–1760 | Succeeded by Philip Wenman |
