= Sir Robert Jenkinson, 5th Baronet =

- Born: 1720; Oxfordshire
- Died: 8 August 1766 (aged 46); Hawkesbury, Gloucestershire

Sir Robert Jenkinson (1720–1766) was the 5th baronet Jenkinson of Walcot and Hawkesbury.

== Early life and education ==
The son of Sir Banks Jenkinson, 4th Baronet, and Catherine Dashwood. Jenkinson was baptised on 13 August 1720 at Charlbury. He was educated at John Roysse's Free School in Abingdon, (now Abingdon School) and later St John's College, Oxford and was awarded an Honorary Master of Arts degree; matriculated 31 May 1738 aged 17.

== Career ==
He earned a Doctor of Civil Law on 17 April 1749 but it is unknown if he practiced. He was a Steward of the OA Club in 1748.

== Peerage ==
He succeeded his father Sir Banks Jenkinson, 4th Baronet, to the title on 2 July 1738. He married Mary Cope but did not have any children. He died on 8 August 1766, aged 46 and was succeeded by Sir Banks Jenkinson, 6th Baronet. He was buried on 12 August at Hawkesbury, Gloucestershire.

== See also ==
- List of Old Abingdonians

Baronetage of England
| Preceded by Sir Banks Jenkinson, 4th Bt | Baronet (of Walcot and Hawkesbury); 1738–1766 | Succeeded by Sir Banks Jenkinson, 6th Bt |
