= Sir Robert Jenkinson, 2nd Baronet =

English landowner and Tory politician

- Born: 1655
- Died: 1710 (aged 54–55)
- Parent: Robert Jenkinson

Sir Robert Jenkinson, 2nd Baronet (c. 1655 – 1710), of Walcot, Charlbury, Oxfordshire, and Hawkesbury, Gloucestershire, was an English landowner and Tory politician who sat in the English and British House of Commons between 1689 and 1710.

== Early life ==
Jenkinson was the eldest son of Sir Robert Jenkinson, 1st Baronet, of Walcot, and his wife Mary Bankes, daughter of Sir John Bankes of Corfe Castle, Dorset. He matriculated at Brasenose College, Oxford, on 11 November 1671, aged 17 and was admitted at Inner Temple in 1672. In 1677, he succeeded to the baronetcy on the death of his father. From 1679 to 1680, he was Commissioner for assessment for Oxfordshire. He was a freeman of Woodstock in 1680 and a Justice of the Peace for Oxfordshire from 1680 to March 1688. He was deputy lieutenant for Oxfordshire from 1681 to February 1688. He married Sarah Tomlins, daughter of Thomas Tomlins, Grocer, of London and Bromley, Middlesex on 14 February 1684. He was freeman of Oxford in 1684 and restored as Justice of the Peace for Oxfordshire in October 1688.

== Career ==
Jenkinson was returned as Member of Parliament for Oxfordshire at the 1689 English general election. He was also restored as deputy lieutenant for Oxfordshire and was Commissioner for assessment for Oxfordshire and Oxford in 1689. He was returned again for Oxfordshire in a contest at the 1690 English general election and was returned unopposed at the 1695 English general election. He did not sign the Association in 1696 and lost his places as Deputy lieutenant and Justice of the Peace. He voted against fixing the price of guineas at 22 shillings in March 1696 and voted against the attainder of Sir John Fenwick on 25 November 1696. He was returned for Oxfordshire again at the 1698 English general election in a keenly-fought contest. He was restored as JP for Oxfordshire and Oxford in 1700 for the rest of his life. He was returned unopposed again at the first general election of 1701 but was blacklisted at the dissolution for opposing preparations for war with the French. He was returned again unopposed at the second general election of 1701 and supported the motion to vindicate the Commons’ proceedings in impeaching the former Whig ministers on 26 February 1702. In 1702 he became deputy lieutenant for Oxfordshire, for the rest of his life. He was unopposed again at the 1702 English general election and voted for the Tack on 28 November 1704. At the 1705 English general election he was returned again unopposed and voted against the Court candidate for Speaker on 25 October 1705. He was returned again as a Tory, at the 1708 British general election.

== Death and legacy ==
Jenkinson's wife died on 8 August 1709. He died on 30 January 1710, and was buried at Charlbury. He had nine sons and five daughters and was succeeded in the baronetcy by his eldest son Robert.

Parliament of England
Preceded by The Viscount Falkland; Thomas Tipping	Member of Parliament for Oxfordshire; 1689–1707; With: Sir John Cope 1689–1690; Lord Norreys 1690–1699; Sir Robert Dashwood 1699–1701; Sir Edward Norreys 1701–1707	Succeeded by Parliament of Great Britain
Parliament of Great Britain
Preceded by Parliament of England	Member of Parliament for Oxfordshire; 1707–1710; With: Sir Edward Norreys 1707–1708; Viscount Rialton 1708–1710	Succeeded by Sir Robert Jenkinson, Bt; Viscount Rialton
Baronetage of England
Preceded by Robert Jenkinson	Baronet (of Walcot and Hawkesbury); 1677–1710	Succeeded by Robert Jenkinson
