= Thomas Rowney =

English politician (1668–1727)

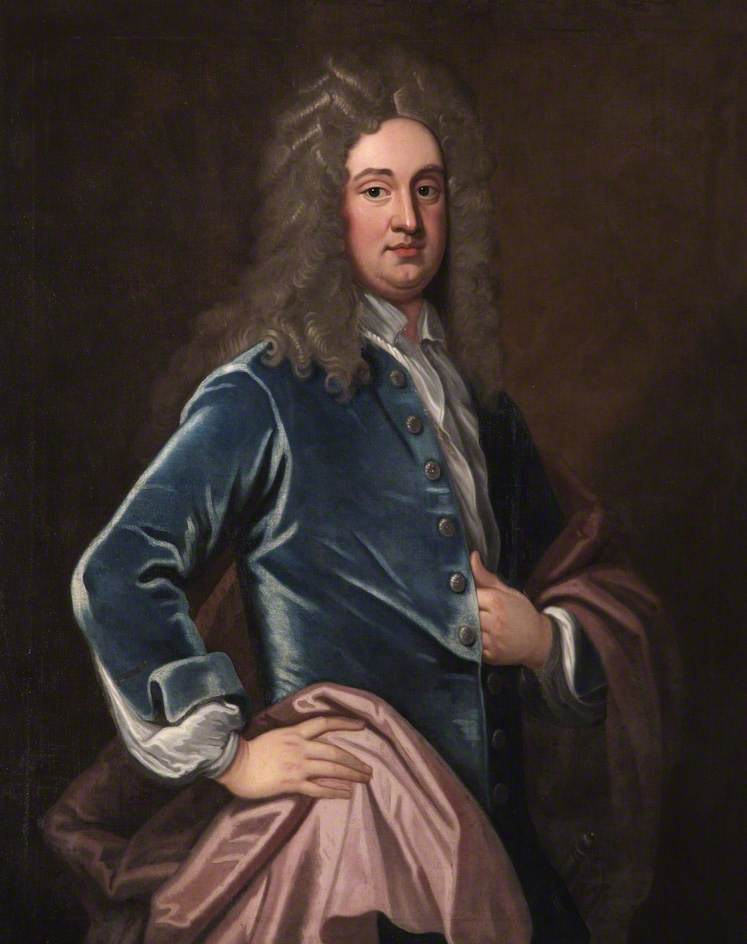
- Portrait of Rowney

Member of Parliament for Oxford
- In office 1695–1722 Serving with Sir Edward Norreys, Francis Norreys, Sir John Walter
- Preceded by: Hon. Henry Bertie; Sir Edward Norreys
- Succeeded by: Thomas Rowney; Sir John Walter

Personal details
- Born: 30 April 1668
- Died: 31 August 1727 (aged 59)
- Spouse: Elizabeth Noel (m. 1691)
- Relations: Edward Noel, 1st Viscount Wentworth (grandson)
- Children: 4

Thomas Rowney (30 April 1668 – 31 August 1727) was an English Tory politician who sat in the English House of Commons between 1695 and 1708 and in the British House of Commons from 1708 to 1722.

== Early life ==
Rowney was baptised on 31 April 1668. He was the only surviving son of Thomas Rowney, of St Giles, London by his second wife, Catherine Bateman (d. 1705). His father, the son of a minor Worcestershire gentleman, had first settled in Oxford around 1650, setting up practice as an attorney. He married the widow of a fellow lawyer which enhanced his wealth and standing, and he acquired considerable property in Oxford's outlying parishes.

He was educated at Shilton, near Burford, in Oxfordshire, in a small school which produced at the same time a Lord High Treasurer (Lord Oxford and Mortimer), a Lord High Chancellor (Lord Harcourt) and a Lord Chief Justice of the Common Pleas (Lord Trevor).

He then matriculated at St John's College, Oxford in 1684. He entered the Inner Temple in 1686, and was called to the bar in 1694.

== Career ==
He served as High Sheriff of Oxfordshire from 1691 to 1692. In 1694, he succeeded to his father's extensive landed property outside Oxford, less than two months after qualifying as a barrister. "His wealth was considerable, by 1721 comprising landholdings in Berkshire, Warwickshire, Worcestershire, and including ancestral lands at Great Hurdington in Gloucestershire where he remained a magistrate after 1714."

For most of his adult life, Rowney was a prominent and much-respected figure in Oxford. and was well acquainted with senior Tory politicians and university dons. In August 1717, the corporation elected him to the ancient office of "barge commissioner," which was reserved for eminent citizens. He was instrumental in the rebuilding of Oxford Town Hall, and his son Thomas saw its completion in 1751.

=== Political career ===
In the election of 1695, Rowney stood for Oxford. He was put up on the Tory slate, likely at the bidding of the 1st Earl of Abingdon, and "was elected after several weeks of bitter campaigning, during which a Whig mob once came close to attacking his house in St. Giles parish." Rowney was returned unopposed in the first election of 1701. Rowney sat for Oxford until 1722 when he was succeeded by his eldest son, Thomas.

== Personal life ==
He married, by license dated 27 May 1691, Elizabeth Noel (d. 1730), a daughter of Edward Noel of St Clement Danes, London. Rowney spent most of his time within the city, where his house, which was extensively rebuilt and finished in 1702, was considered one of the finest. Together, they were the parents of three sons and one daughter, including:

- Thomas Rowney (c. 1693–1759), who married Ms. Trollope in 1756.
- Elizabeth Rowney, who married Sir Clobery Noel, 5th Baronet, of Kirkby Mallory, in 1714.

Rowney died on 31 August 1727 and was buried in the parish church of St Giles, Oxford.

Parliament of England
Preceded by Hon. Henry Bertie; Sir Edward Norreys	Member of Parliament for Oxford; 1695–1708; With: Sir Edward Norreys; Francis Norreys; Sir John Walter	Succeeded by Parliament of Great Britain
Parliament of Great Britain
Preceded by Parliament of England	Member of Parliament for Oxford; 1708–1722; With: Sir John Walter	Succeeded by Thomas Rowney; Sir John Walter
Political offices
Preceded by Simon Whorwood A'Dean	High Sheriff of Oxfordshire; 1691–1692	Succeeded by Thomas Crispe
