= James Etheridge =

English Member of Parliament

Sir James Etheridge (1658–1730), of Harleyford, Buckinghamshire, was an English Member of Parliament (MP).

He was a Member of the Parliament of England for Great Marlow 1695–1715.
