= John Hoby =

English Member of Parliament

John Hoby (c. 1668 – 1689), of Bisham Abbey, Berkshire, was an English Member of Parliament (MP).

He was a Member of the Parliament of England for Great Marlow 8 February to December 1689.
