= Sir Robert Dashwood, 1st Baronet =

English politician

Sir Robert Dashwood Bt
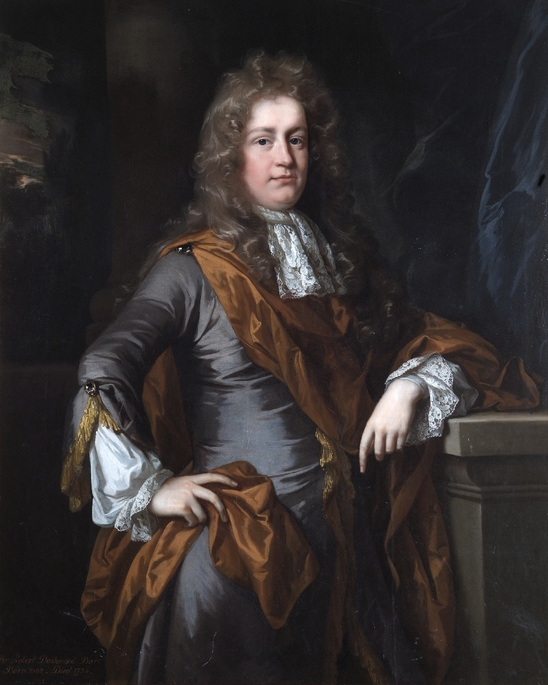
- Sir Robert Dashwood

1st Baronet

Member of Parliament for Banbury
- In office 1689–1699

Member of Parliament for Oxfordshire
- In office 1699–1700
- In office 1684–1734
- Preceded by: New creation
- Succeeded by: James Dashwood, 2nd Baronet

Personal details
- Born: 1662
- Died: 1734 (aged 71–72)
- Party: Tory
- Spouse: Penelope Chamberlayne
- Children: 5 sons, 4 daughters
- Education: Eton College, Trinity College, Oxford

Sir Robert Dashwood, 1st Baronet (1662–1734) was an English politician.

== Life ==
The son of George Dashwood, a London merchant, and Margaret Perry, he was a first cousin of Sir Samuel Dashwood and Sir Francis Dashwood, 1st Baronet (the fortunes of the two branches of the family went back to George Dashwood's grandfather, Robert Dashwood of Stogumber in Somerset, who died in 1610). His brother George was Member of Parliament for Sudbury under Queen Anne, while his sister Elizabeth married Sir Thomas Hare, 2nd Baronet, Member of Parliament for Norfolk. He was educated at Eton College and Trinity College, Oxford, and created a baronet on 16 September 1684.

Dashwood was a Tory and strong Anglican; and a courtier under James II. Despite these views, he became involved in the matter of Edmund Prideaux, implicated in Monmouth's Rebellion in 1685. (There was a family connection, Prideaux being the brother of his mother-in-law Margaret.) Giving and lending money, Dashwood enabled Prideaux to pay off the accusation. He was elected three times as Member of Parliament for Banbury from 1689; and for Oxfordshire in November 1699, losing his seat in 1700. As the 1690s proceeded, he became identified with the Country Party opposition.

== Family ==
On 9 June 1683 Dashwood married Penelope, daughter of Sir Thomas Chamberlayne, 2nd Baronet. They had five sons and four daughters.

Their eldest son surviving to adulthood was Robert, who married Dorothea Read(e). The next son Richard married a cousin, Elizabeth Lewis (as a granddaughter of Sir Samuel Dashwood, a second cousin once removed). Their daughter Penelope married Sir John Stonhouse, 3rd Baronet, Member of Parliament for Berkshire. The third daughter Catherine married Sir Banks Jenkinson, 4th Baronet.

The other daughters were Margaret (who died young), and Anne who married Anthony Cope (he was son of Jonathan Cope and brother of Sir Jonathan Cope, 1st Baronet, both MPs). Robert the son died in 1728, in Paris, before his father. His son became Sir James Dashwood, 2nd Baronet in 1734.

== Notes ==
Baronetage of England
New creation	Baronet (of Kirtlington); 1684–1734	Succeeded by James Dashwood
