= Thomas Horde (Oxfordshire MP) =

English politician (1625–1715)

Thomas Horde (26 July 1625 – 6 November 1715) was an English politician. He sat as MP for Oxfordshire in October 1679 and 1681.

== Political career ==
He also served as commissioner for assessment in Oxfordshire from January 1660 till 1680, in Berkshire from 1679 till 1680, in Berkshire and Oxfordshire from 1689 till 1690; commissioner of militia in Oxfordshire in March 1660; justice of the peace in Oxfordshire from March 1660 till 1680 and February 1688 possibly until his death, in Berkshire from 1689 possibly until his death, freeman of Oxford in September 1660 and deputy lieutenant of Oxfordshire form February 1688 till 1702.

== Family ==
He was the first son of Sir Thomas Horde by his first wife Frances, the daughter of Sir Thomas Gardiner. By 1653, he was married to Barbara (died 12 August 1671), the daughter of Charles Trinder and widow of William Rainton and they had five sons (four predeceased him) and seven daughters. On 22 September 1673, he married his second wife, Susannah (died 12 August 1680), the daughter of Sir Erasmus de la Fontaine and they had two daughters. Before 1686, he married his third wife, Mary (died 1717), the daughter of Jonathan Barford and widow of Paul Castleman and they had no children.
