= Drayton, Cherwell =

Village in Oxfordshire, England

Coordinates: 52.072°N 1.375°W

Drayton
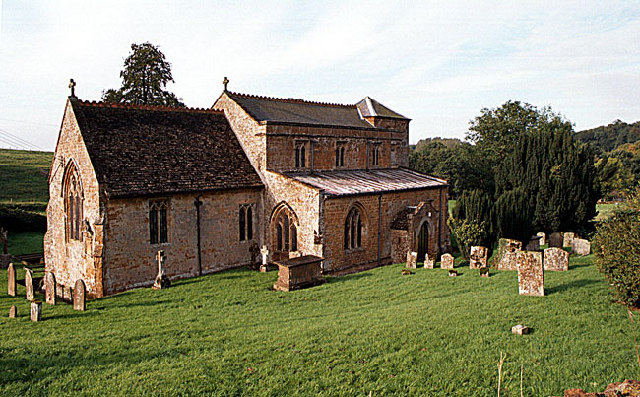
- St Peter's parish church

- Location within Oxfordshire
- Area: 3.11 km^{2} (1.20 sq mi)
- Population: 242 (2011 Census)
  - Density: 78/km^{2} (200/sq mi)
- OS grid reference: SP4241
- Civil parish: Drayton
- Shire county: Oxfordshire
- Region: South East
- Country: England
- Sovereign state: United Kingdom
- Post town: Banbury
- Postcode district: OX15
- Dialling code: 01295
- Police: Thames Valley
- Fire: Oxfordshire
- Ambulance: South Central
- UK Parliament: Banbury

Drayton is a village and civil parish in the valley of the Sor Brook in Oxfordshire, about 2 miles (3 km) northwest of Banbury. The 2011 Census recorded the parish's population as 242.

== Early history ==
Tesselated tiles and Roman coins found near the parish church indicate that there was a Roman villa in the area of what later became Drayton village. Drayton village is Saxon in origin. Its toponym comes from the Old English drag meaning to carry goods.

== Manor ==
After the Norman conquest of 1066, the conquering Normans dispossessed many Saxon landowners. However, the Domesday Book records that in 1086 Drayton still belonged to a Saxon thegn, Turchil of Arden. Two years later, in 1088, William the Conqueror created the Earldom of Warwick and thereafter gave Turchil's estates to the Norman nobleman Henry de Beaumont, 1st Earl of Warwick. The Arden family seems to have remained as tenants of the Earldom, for in 1204 a Thomas Arden held the tenancy. In 1329 Sir Robert Arden was licensed to crenellate Drayton manor house. The male line of the Arden family ended in 1376 with the death of Sir Giles Arden, whose son had predeceased him. Sir Giles' granddaughters Margaret and Joan were minors, but on reaching their majority and marriage they inherited the Drayton estate.

Joan and her husband surrendered their share of Drayton to Margaret who had married Lewis Greville. The house remained the seat of the Greville family until 1565, when a later Lewis Greville was heavily in debt and sold the manor to one Thomas Webb. By 1588 Thomas Webb had died leaving Drayton to his brother Richard and widow Katherine. Lewis Greville lured Richard Webb to Sezincote House in Gloucestershire where Greville got Webb drunk, persuaded him to write a will in Greville's favour and then murdered him. Greville was tried for murder, and because he refused to enter a plea he was executed by pressing instead of hanging.

By 1598 most of the manor of Drayton belonged to Anthony Cope of Hanwell. In 1611 Elizabeth I made Cope Sir Anthony Cope, 1st Baronet. Drayton remained with the Cope Baronets of Hanwell until the death of Sir John Cope, 5th Baronet in 1721. It then passed to another branch of the Cope family, Sir Jonathan Cope, 1st Baronet of Bruern. When Sir Charles Cope, 3rd Baronet died in 1781, Drayton passed to one of his sisters, Catherine. In 1790 Catherine's daughter Arabella was married to John Sackville, 3rd Duke of Dorset and received Drayton from her mother.

In 1825 Drayton was inherited by the Duke and Duchess's younger daughter, Elizabeth Sackville-West, Countess De La Warr. When she died in 1870 her manorial rights passed to the North family of Wroxton Abbey. In about 1629 Sir William Cope, 2nd Baronet sold a large acreage of land at Drayton to William Fiennes, 1st Viscount Saye and Sele of Broughton Castle. By 1790 the same property belonged to Francis North, 1st Earl of Guilford of Wroxton Abbey. In 1935 and 1942 the Norths sold their lands at Drayton to Trinity College, Oxford.

== Parish church ==
The Church of England parish church of Saint Peter was in existence by 1223. Its earliest surviving features are a Norman priest's doorway and the font. In the 14th century St Peter's was almost completely rebuilt and north and south aisles were added, all in the Decorated Gothic style. Lobel and Crossley contend that the clerestorey was added at the same time, but it is in the Perpendicular Gothic style and Sherwood and Pevsner contend it was added later. The low west tower was added in 1808 and has three 17th-century bells: two cast in 1634 and two more cast in 1670. In 1878 the Gothic Revival architect Edwin Dolby restored the church and added a vestry. St Peter's is a Grade II* listed building.

Sir Anthony Cope, 1st Baronet (1550–1615) was a puritan, and in 1598 he presented Robert Cleaver, a presbyterian to be curate of Drayton. John Bridges, whom James I had appointed Bishop of Oxford in 1603, suspended Cleaver for failing to adhere to the Book of Common Prayer. In 1607 Sir Anthony Cope persuaded Richard Bancroft, Archbishop of Canterbury to accept Henry Scudder as Drayton's new curate. In 1619 Scudder was succeeded by another puritan, Thomas Lodge, who was described as "a burning and a shining light" and was curate until 1651. A low church tradition survived in Drayton with John Dover, who was curate 1688–1725. From 1778 until the 1960s all of Drayton's curates were Evangelicals and most had served as missionaries in other continents. St Peter's is now one of eight ecclesiastical parishes in the Ironstone Benefice.

== Social and economic history ==
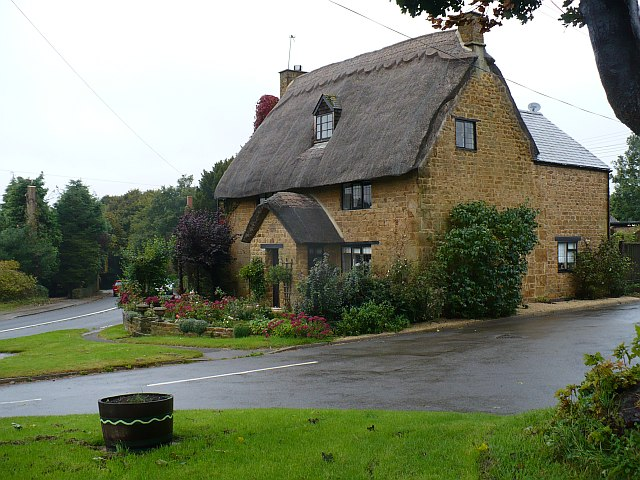
Ivy Cottage, a thatched 16th century Hornton Stone house in Drayton

The Domesday Book records that in 1086 Drayton had a water mill, presumably on Sor Brook on the western boundary of the parish just below the village. There is then a gap of five centuries in which no mill is recorded, but records resume with a mill operating in the parish from 1589 until 1851. A parsonage was built in Drayton in the 16th century. In 1862 it was replaced by a large new rectory built on the same site by the architect Arthur Blomfield, but the Victorian house retains cellars built in the 17th century.

The main road between Banbury and Warwick runs north–south along a ridge in the eastern part of the parish. It was made into a turnpike in 1744 and ceased to be one in 1871. In the 1920s it was classified as part of the A41 road. After the completion of the M40 motorway in 1990 this part of the A41 was "detrunked" and reclassified as the B4100. The main road between Banbury and Stratford-upon-Avon branches off the Banbury - Warwick road and descends through Drayton village to cross Sor Brook. An Act of Parliament to turn this road was passed in 1747; works to improve the road and establish toll houses were not undertaken until 1754. Since the 1920s it has been classified the A422 road.

Drayton's earliest recorded public houses were licensed from 1753. By 1782 the village had two pubs, the Hare and Hounds and the Roebuck Inn. The last record of the Hare and Hounds is from 1806, but the Roebuck Inn continues to trade. It is a 17th-century Hornton Stone building with a thatched roof, and is controlled by the local Hook Norton Brewery.

Thomas Webb had enclosed some of Drayton's farmland when he bought the manor from Lewis Greville in 1565, but the villagers farmed most of the parish on an open field system until it was enclosed in 1802. By 1833 Drayton had two day schools and a Sunday school. One of the day schools was still extant in 1855, when the 5th Earl De La Warr and Countess De La Warr had given two cottages to be converted into a schoolroom. This was rebuilt by 1891 but was still unsatisfactory and in 1900 a separate infants' classroom was built. The number of pupils declined in the 1930s and the school was closed in 1948.

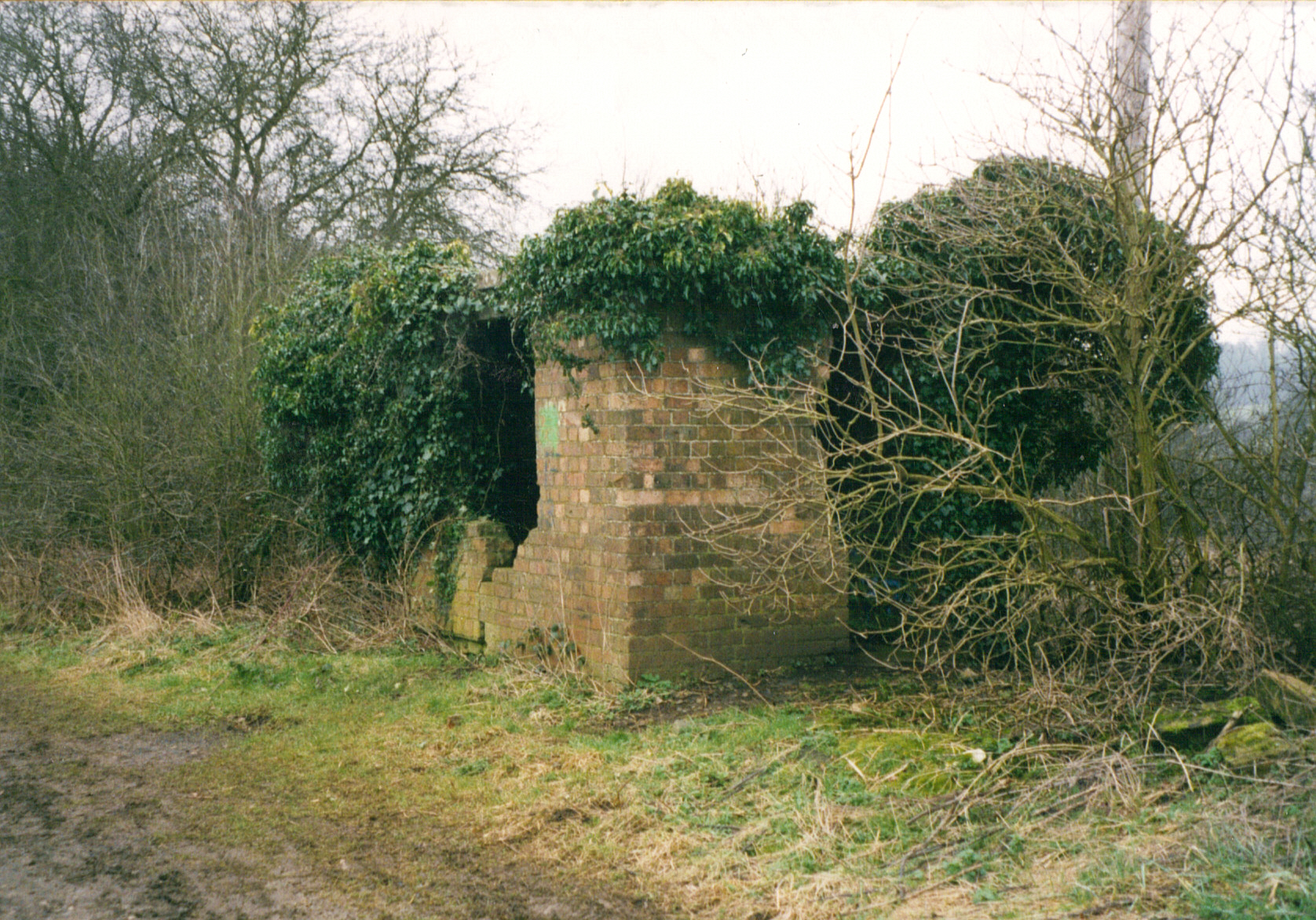
Oxfordshire Ironstone Railway's permanent way hut (known as a P-hut) at Drayton in 2005. A P-hut was used by track maintenance staff. At the far right is a pile of rubble where a signal post used to be.

The Oxfordshire Ironstone Railway was built during the First World War to carry ironstone from a quarry west of Horley to a junction with the Great Western Railway just north of Banbury. The ironstone railway passed just north of Drayton. It was opened in 1917 and closed in 1967.

== North Oxfordshire Academy ==
North Oxfordshire Academy is a county secondary school just outside the village. It was founded in 2007 to take over the premises of the former Drayton School, which had been opened in 1973.

== See also ==
- History of Banbury, Oxfordshire

== Sources ==
- Lobel, Mary D; Crossley, Alan, eds. (1969). A History of the County of Oxford. Victoria County History. Vol. 9: Bloxham Hundred. London: Oxford University Press for the Institute of Historical Research. pp. 103–112. ISBN 978-0-19722-726-8.
- Sherwood, Jennifer; Pevsner, Nikolaus (1974). Oxfordshire. The Buildings of England. Harmondsworth: Penguin Books. p. 587. ISBN 0-14-071045-0.
