= Cope baronets of Hanwell (1611) =

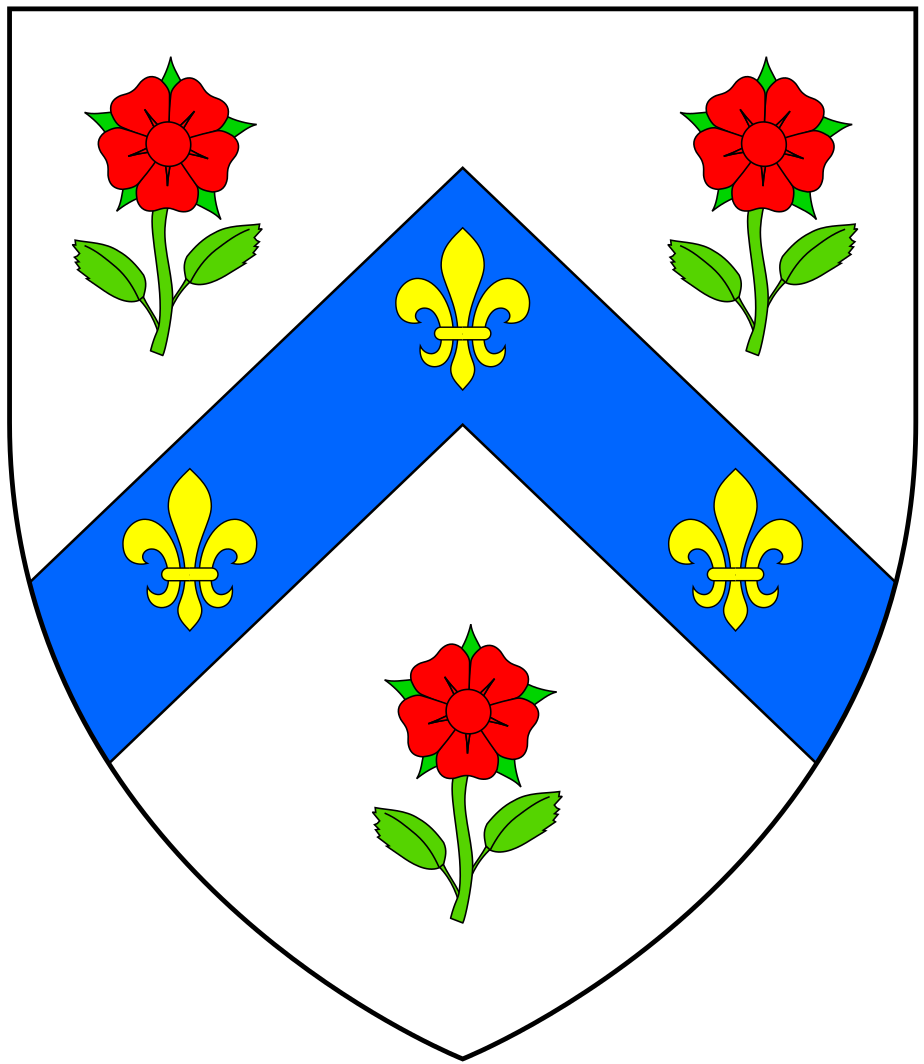
Escutcheon of the Cope baronets of Hanwell

The Cope baronetcy of Hanwell, Oxfordshire was created in the Baronetage of England on 29 June 1611 for Anthony Cope of Hanwell Castle. He was a descendant of Sir William Cope, to whom the manor of Hanwell was granted in 1498, and of Sir Anthony Cope. He was Member of Parliament for Banbury and for Oxfordshire.

The 2nd, 4th and 5th Baronets also represented both Banbury and Oxfordshire. In 1699 the 6th Baronet purchased Bramshill House, Hampshire from Sir Andrew Henley, 3rd Baronet; it became the family seat. He was member for Plymouth and Tavistock. The 7th Baronet represented Banbury and Newport, IOW.

The baronetcy was extinct on the death in 1972 of the 16th Baronet.

== Cope baronets, of Hanwell (1611) ==
- Sir Anthony Cope, 1st Baronet (1550–1615)
- Sir William Cope, 2nd Baronet (1577–1637)
- Sir John Cope, 3rd Baronet (1608–1638)
- Sir Anthony Cope, 4th Baronet (1632–1675)
- Sir John Cope, 5th Baronet (1634–1721)
- Sir John Cope, 6th Baronet (1673–1749)
- Sir Monoux Cope, 7th Baronet (1696–1763)
- Sir John Mordaunt Cope, 8th Baronet (1731–1779)
- Sir Richard Cope, 9th Baronet (1719–1806)
- Sir Denzil Cope, 10th Baronet (1766–1812)
- Sir John Cope, 11th Baronet (1768–1851)
- Sir William Henry Cope, 12th Baronet (1811–1892)
- Sir Anthony Cope, 13th Baronet (1842–1932)
- Sir Denzil Cope, 14th Baronet (1873–1940)
- Sir Anthony Mohun Leckonby Cope, 15th Baronet (1927–1966)
- Sir Mordaunt Leckonby Cope, MC, 16th Baronet (1878–1972), who left no heir.
