= William Cope =

William Cope may refer to:

- Sir William Cope (cofferer) (c. 1440–1513), cofferer to Henry VII and Keeper of Portchester Castle
- Sir William Cope, 2nd Baronet (died 1637), MP for Banbury, Oxfordshire and Newton
- William Cope, 1st Baron Cope (1870–1946), British politician and Wales international rugby player
- William Cope (footballer) (1884–1937), English footballer with Oldham and West Ham
- William T. Cope (1836–1902), Republican politician in the state of Ohio and Ohio State Treasurer
- Bill Cope (academic) (born 1957), Australian academic, author and educational theorist
- Bill Cope (footballer) (1899–1979), English soccer player with Bolton and Port Vale
