= Sir William Cope, 2nd Baronet =

English politician

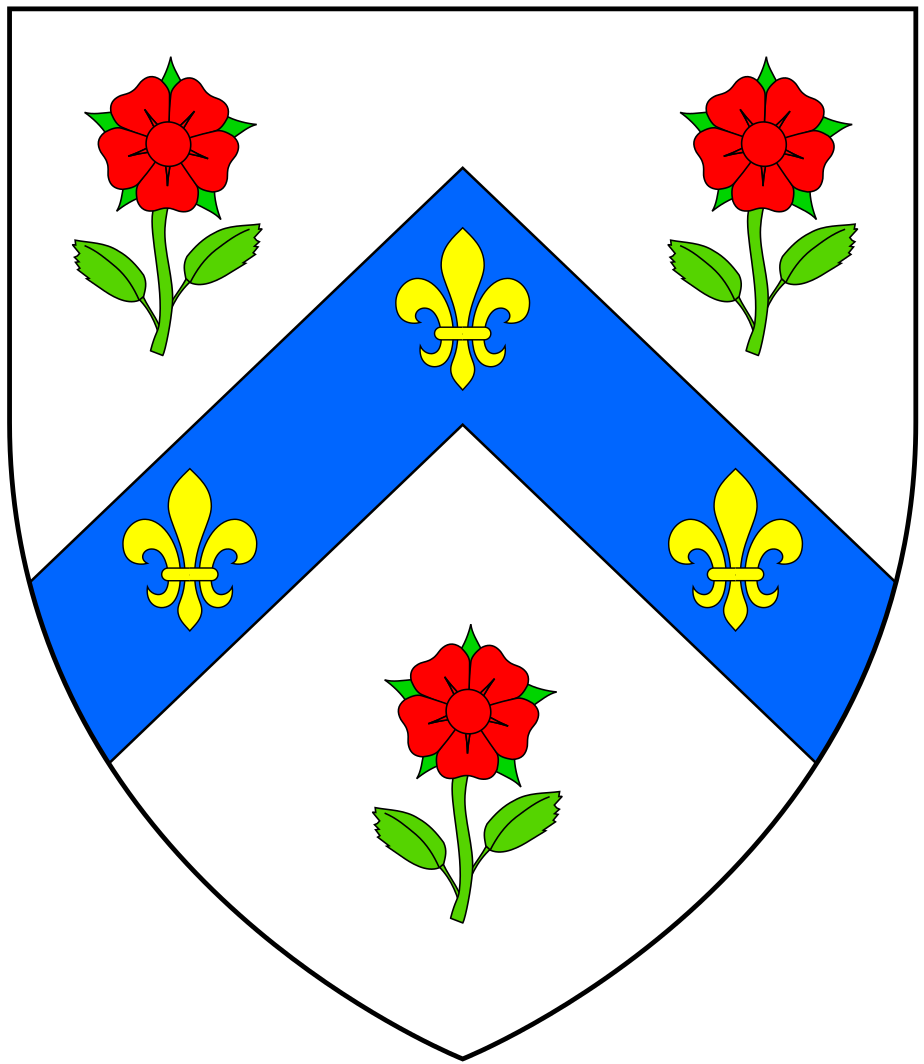
Arms of Cope of Hanwell Castle

Sir William Cope, 2nd Baronet (1577 Hanwell, Oxfordshire - 2 August 1637) was an English politician who sat in the House of Commons at various times between 1604 and 1625.

== Family ==
William Cope was the son of Sir Anthony Cope, 1st Baronet of Hanwell, Oxfordshire and his first wife Frances Lytton. Cope's grandfather was principal chamberlain Sir Anthony Cope. Cope's great-grandfather was King Henry VII's cofferer William Cope PC.

Cope married Elizabeth Chaworth, daughter of Sir George Chaworth of Wiverton, Nottinghamshire at Hanwell on 8 April 1602. They had three children:

1. Frances Cope
2. Sir John Cope, 3rd Baronet of Hanwell
3. Jonathan Cope (1637-1670), owner of Ranton Abbey, father of Jonathan Cope MP for Stafford

The family lived at Hanwell Castle.

John Cope, 3rd Baronet, married Elizabeth Fane, the daughter of Francis Fane, 1st Earl of Westmoreland, and Mary Mildmay, Countess of Westmoreland.

== Career ==
Cope graduated from Queen's College at the University of Oxford.

In 1614, Cope joined a syndicate led by Lord Treasurer Thomas Howard, 1st Earl of Suffolk and London alderman Sir William Cockayne, which was involved in selling licenses to export wool. In 1617, Cope proposed the establishment of clothing and manufacturing industries in Ireland. The following year, in 1618, Cope invested in The Honourable The Irish Society.

Cope inherited the lease for the Custom House Quay in the City London from his father, and uncle Sir Walter Cope.

Cope served as Commissioner of Oyer and Terminer for the Oxford Circuit from 1617 to 1625. He was a Subsidy Commissioner for Oxfordshire during 1621–1622 and again in 1624. In 1634, he was appointed as Commissioner of Sewers for Berkshire and Oxfordshire.

In 1604, he was elected Member of Parliament for Banbury. He was re-elected MP for Banbury in 1614. On 8 August 1615 he was admitted to Lincoln's Inn. He was High Sheriff of Oxfordshire from 1619 to 1620. In 1621 he was elected MP for Oxfordshire and for Banbury. He was elected MP for Oxfordshire in 1624 and again for Banbury in 1625.

== Titles ==
He was knighted by King James I at the London Charterhouse on 11 May 1603. He succeeded to the baronetcy on the death of his father on 23 July 1615.

== Royal Visits to Hanwell ==
Sir William Cope entertained King James I in 1616 and King Charles I in 1636 at Hanwell Castle.

== Death ==
He died on 2 August 1637 and was buried on 22 August 1637 at St Peter's Church in Hanwell.

Parliament of England
Preceded by Anthony Cope	Member of Parliament for Banbury; 1604–1622	Succeeded by Sir Erasmus Dryden
Preceded by Sir Anthony Cope, 1st Baronet; Sir John Croke	Member of Parliament for Oxfordshire; 1621–1624; With: Sir Richard Wenman 1621; Sir Henry Poole 1624	Succeeded by Edward Wray; Sir Richard Wenman
Preceded by Sir Erasmus Dryden	Member of Parliament for Banbury; 1625	Succeeded by James Fiennes
Baronetage of England
Preceded by Anthony Cope	Baronet (of Hanwell); 1615–1637	Succeeded by John Cope
