= OIR =

OIR may refer to:

- Organisation Internationale de Radiodiffusion, original official name of the International Radio and Television Organisation
- Organización Impulsora de Radio, network division of Grupo Radio Centro
- Operation Inherent Resolve, United States military operation
- Okushiri Airport, IATA code
- Oxfordshire Ironstone Railway
- Óir, one of the forfeda letters of the Ogham alphabet
