= Walter Cope =

English noble (c. 1553–1614)

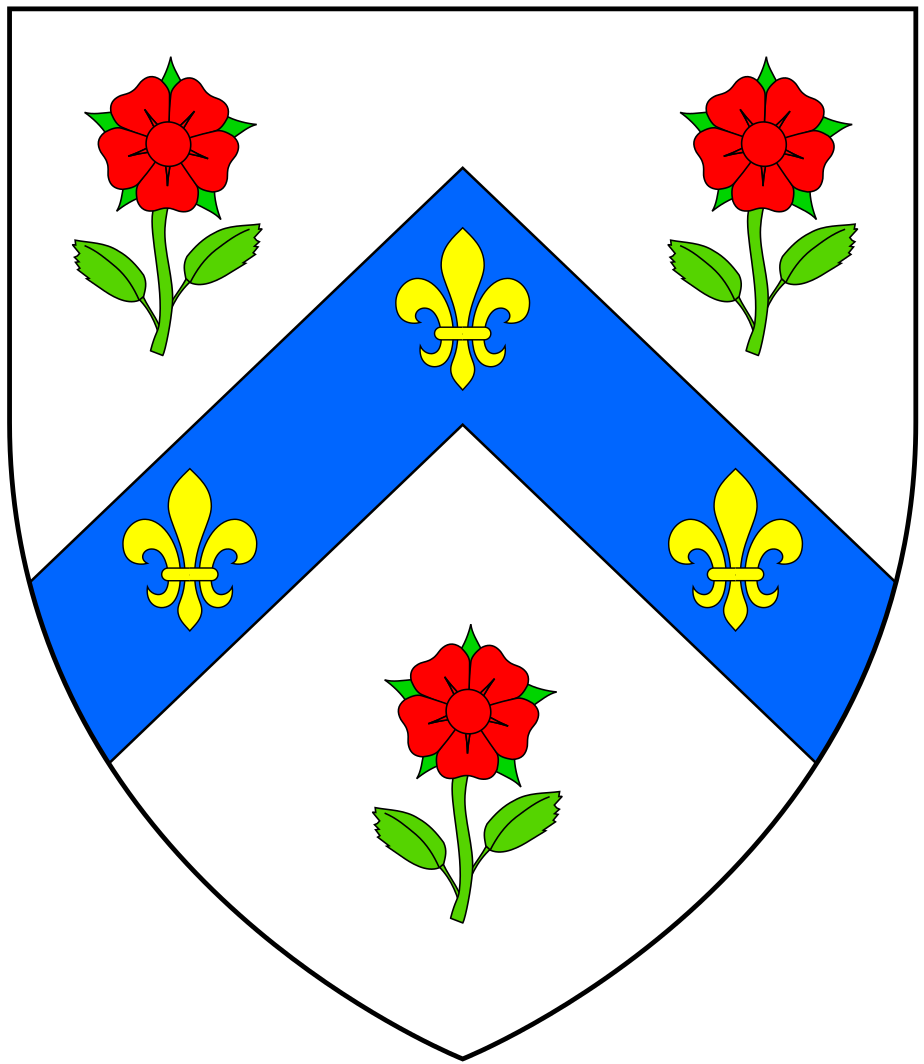
Arms of Cope of Hanwell: Argent, on a chevron azure between 3 roses gules slipped proper 3 fleurs-de-lys or

Sir Walter Cope (c. 1553 – 30 July 1614) of Cope Castle in the parish of Kensington, Middlesex, England, was Master of the Court of Wards, Chamberlain of the Exchequer, public Registrar-General of Commerce and a Member of Parliament for Westminster.

== Origins ==
Walter Cope, probably born at Hardwick Manor near Banbury in Oxfordshire, was the third son of Edward Cope (d.1557) of Hanwell, Oxfordshire by his wife Elizabeth Mohun, a daughter of Walter Mohun of Overstone, Northamptonshire. Walter's mother later remarried to George Carleton of Wollaston, Northamptonshire. He was the grandson of Sir Anthony Cope and Jane Crewys and was a second cousin of Lady Burghley.

== Career ==
In 1570 he entered Gray's Inn as a law student. He became a Gentleman Usher to William Cecil, 1st Baron Burghley, and in 1574 was appointed as feodary for Oxfordshire for the Court of Wards and Liveries. By 1593 he had become Burghley's secretary and the trusted friend of Sir Sir Robert Cecil, Burghley's son. In 1601 he was also appointed feodary for the City of London and Middlesex.

In 1603 Cope travelled to Edinburgh to welcome King James VI of Scotland at his proclamation as King James I of England and was subsequently knighted at Worksop. On 2 September 1603 Cope organised a demonstration of a canoe paddled on the Thames near Cecil House by three Virginian Indians from Tsenacommacah. In January 1605, he planned a revival of William Shakespeare's play Love's Labour's Lost by Cuthbert Burbage's theatre company at Cecil House to entertain James' consort, Anne of Denmark.

In 1604 Cope was elected a Member of Parliament for Westminster in James' first Parliament of England. His assistance was begged for by Dudley Carleton, 1st Viscount Dorchester who had been incorrectly suspected of involvement in the Gunpowder Plot. In 1605 Cope began building a grand house for himself known as Cope Castle, in Kensington, near London, subsequently inherited by his daughter, Isabel, Countess of Holland, and later known as Holland House.

He was made a Gentleman Usher of the Privy Chamber for life by 1607. In 1608 he was given a life position of Chamberlain of the Exchequer and in October of that year was granted one-sixth of all fines received by the king for the following twenty-one years. In 1611 or 1612, he was appointed the public Registrar-General of Commerce and together with Cecil, joint-keeper of Hyde Park, a royal park near his home at Kensington. Walks at Hyde Park were replanted with two hundred lime trees imported from the Low Countries and ponds were repaired. Cope was paid £33 for these works in October 1612.

Following the death of James' eldest son Henry Frederick, Prince of Wales in November 1612, the king spent the night at Cope Castle, and was joined there the following day by his next son Prince Charles and by his daughter Princess Elizabeth and by Frederick V, Elector Palatine. Shortly afterwards the king appointed Cope as Master of the Court of Wards.

During the Addled Parliament of 1614, Sir Thomas Parry, Chancellor of the Duchy of Lancaster, was found to have fraudulently altered an elector's return after his nominees, including Cope (to whom he had offered one of the Stockbridge seats), had been refused; Cope's election was subsequently annulled.

== Marriage and children ==
Arms of Grenville of Buckinghamshire: Vert, on a cross argent five torteaux

Cope married Dorothy Grenville, a daughter of Richard Grenville (1527–1604) of Wotton Underwood, Buckinghamshire but left no sons, only a daughter and sole heiress:

- Isabel Cope, who married Sir Henry Rich, 1st Baron Kensington, 1st Earl of Holland (1590–1649).

== Death and burial ==
In 1614 occurred the death of Cope's elder brother Sir Anthony Cope, 1st Baronet, who had been made a baronet in 1611. Within a month of his brother's death, Cope became unwell, and died at Cope Castle on 30 July 1614. He was buried in the parish church of Kensington. Chamberlain later speculated that Cope's heart had been broken by the loss of his brother and by his heavy debts, supposedly over £26,000, and by the prospect of losing the Mastership of the Wards.
