= Cope baronets of Bruern (1714) =

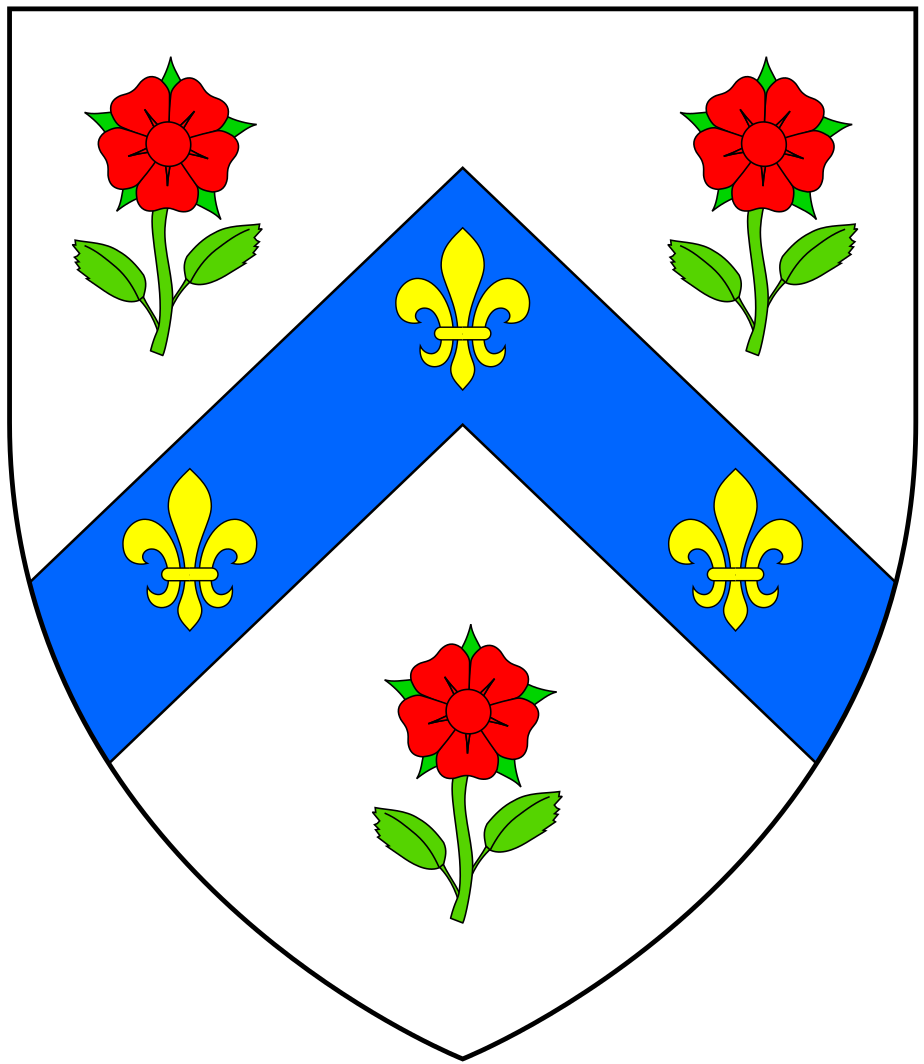
Escutcheon of the Cope baronets of Bruern

The Cope baronetcy of Bruern, Oxfordshire was created in the Baronetage of Great Britain on 1 March 1714 for Jonathan Cope II of Bruern Abbey. He was the son of Jonathan Cope I of Ranton Abbey, a younger son of the 2nd Baronet of the first creation. He was Member of Parliament for Banbury from 1713 to 1722.

The baronetcy was extinct on the death of the 4th Baronet in 1821.

== Cope baronets, of Bruern (1714) ==
- Sir Jonathan Cope, 1st Baronet (c. 1690–1765)
- Sir Charles Cope, 2nd Baronet (c.1743–1781)
- Sir Charles Cope, 3rd Baronet (c.1770–1781)
- Sir Jonathan Cope, 4th Baronet (c.1758–1821)

== Notes ==
Baronetage of Great Britain
| Preceded by Des Bouverie baronets | Cope baronets of Bruern; 1 March 1714 | Succeeded by Buswell baronets |
