= George Fitz-Hardinge Berkeley =

Anglo-Irish soldier and Home Rule supporter

George Berkeley
Personal information
- Full name: George Fitz-Hardinge Berkeley
- Born: 29 January 1870; Dublin, Ireland
- Died: 14 November 1955 (aged 85); Banbury, Oxfordshire, England
- Batting: Right-handed
- Bowling: Left-arm medium

Domestic team information
- Years: Team
- 1890–1893: Oxford University
- First-class debut: 19 May 1890 Oxford University v Australians
- Last First-class: 14 May 1906 H. D. G. Leveson Gower's XI v Oxford University

Career statistics
Competition	First-class
Matches	32
Runs scored	324
Batting average	10.12
100s/50s	0/0
Top score	38
Balls bowled	6,288
Wickets	131
Bowling average	20.75
5 wickets in innings	9
10 wickets in match	1
Best bowling	8/70
Catches/stumpings	17/–
- Source: CricketArchive, 21 November 2012

George Fitz-Hardinge Berkeley (29 January 1870 – 14 November 1955) was an Anglo-Irish soldier, Irish nationalist, public servant, cricketer, and author.

== Personal life ==
George Fitz-Hardinge Berkeley was born in 1870, the only child of George Sackville Berkeley, a major in the Royal Engineers. He was educated at Wellington College and Keble College, Oxford. He later practised at the Irish Bar. In 1899 he married Caroline Isabel Mason. He moved to Italy in 1920 for the good of his wife's health; she died in 1933. The following year he married Janet Margaret Mary Weld, with whom he co-wrote a history of Italian unification. He was a member of two gentlemen's clubs: Vincent's in Oxford and the Kildare Street Club in Dublin. He died at his home, Hanwell Castle, near Banbury, Oxfordshire.

== Public life ==
Berkeley served in the Worcestershire Regiment from 1898 to 1901. He supported Irish Home Rule and the Irish Volunteers, and at a 1914 meeting in Alice Stopford Green's London home he subscribed the largest amount to the arms purchase fund which resulted in the Howth gun-running. In the First World War he was a brigade musketry officer with the 3rd Cavalry reserve. After the war he was a member of the Claims Commission in France and Italy. In 1920 he was active in the Irish Dominion League, which proposed Dominion status for Ireland, and with the Peace with Ireland Council, of British public figures opposed to the government's waging of the Anglo-Irish War. In 1954 he submitted two papers to the Irish Bureau of Military History relating to his 1914 and 1920 activities. He was a magistrate in Oxfordshire from 1906 to 1937.

== Cricket career ==
Berkeley played for Oxford University Cricket Club in the 1890s. A left-arm medium pace bowler, he took 131 wickets in 32 first-class appearances at an average of 20.75. He's best bowling performance occurred on his debut, when he took eight wickets for Oxford University in the first innings against the touring Australians. Berkeley was awarded his blue, appearing against Cambridge in the University match, in each of his four years at Oxford. He was Oxford's leading wicket-taker during his first three years at the university, but in the third, he was unable to play in all the matches, but maintained a strong bowling average. He played twice for Ireland, taking 11 for 75 against I Zingari in Phoenix Park in 1890. He later played minor counties cricket for Oxfordshire between 1904 and 1906.

== Publications ==
- Williams, Basil, ed. (1911). "The Present System of Government in Ireland". Home rule problems. London: P.S. King & Son. pp. 35–48.
- The Irish Battalion in the papal army of 1860. Dublin: Talbot Press. 1929. OCLC 891427156.
- The Campaign of Adowa and the Rise of Menelik (New ed.). London: Constable. 1902. OCLC 817172475.
- Italy in the Making. Cambridge University Press. 1932–1940. OCLC 875306146. (with Joan Berkeley; 3 volumes)
- Wellington College: the founders of the tradition. Newport: R.H. Johns. 1948. OCLC 2570688.
