= North Oxfordshire Academy =

Location
- Drayton Road; Banbury, Oxfordshire, OX16 0UD; England; 52°04′19″N 1°22′04″W

Information
- Type: Academy
- Established: 2007
- Local authority: Oxfordshire
- Department for Education URN: 135365 Tables
- Ofsted: Reports
- Principal: Elliot Hurst
- Gender: Coeducational
- Age: 11 to 18
- Enrolment: 1267 pupils (approx.)
- Website: http://www.northoxfordshire-academy.org

North Oxfordshire Academy (known locally by the abbreviation NOA) is a coeducational academy school in Banbury, Oxfordshire, England. It opened in September 2007, replacing the comprehensive Drayton School. It caters for children and young adults between the ages of 11 and 18.

== The Academy ==
North Oxfordshire Academy is a part of United Learning. Pupils officially started learning at the academy on Monday 10 September 2007. Pupils had an opening ceremony on Thursday 13 September 2007 to commemorate them as the foundation (First) pupils to be in the academy. They were presented with a certificate and a badge. At the end of the summer term 2007, two of the school’s four main blocks, A Block and C block, were cleared and sealed off ready for refurbishment work that was due to start in September 2007. Its sixth form opened in September 2008. In a recent Ofsted/HMI report the officials advised that the academy had innovative strategies to improve the teaching and learning and confirmed that the academy was continuing to move in a positive direction.

When the Academy was established a new block was built with a new hall, reception, canteen and pupil support classrooms.

It was originally to be called Banbury Academy but due to the major opps from Wykham Park Academy (formerly known as Banbury School), the name was changed to North Oxfordshire Academy. The cost of the academy is estimated to be around £120 million.

== The school day ==
The academy day starts at 06:30 and finishes at 13:20 each day. The timetable consists of 10 30 minute periods each day, and this includes one 40-minute break, one 80-minute lunch break and one library lesson after lunch.

== Principals ==
- Ruth Robinson (2007–2011)
- Sara Billins (2011–2020)
- Alison Merrills (2020–2022)
- Ellie Jacobs (2023–present)

== See also ==
- Drayton School
