= Anthony Cope (author) =

English author (c.1486–1551)

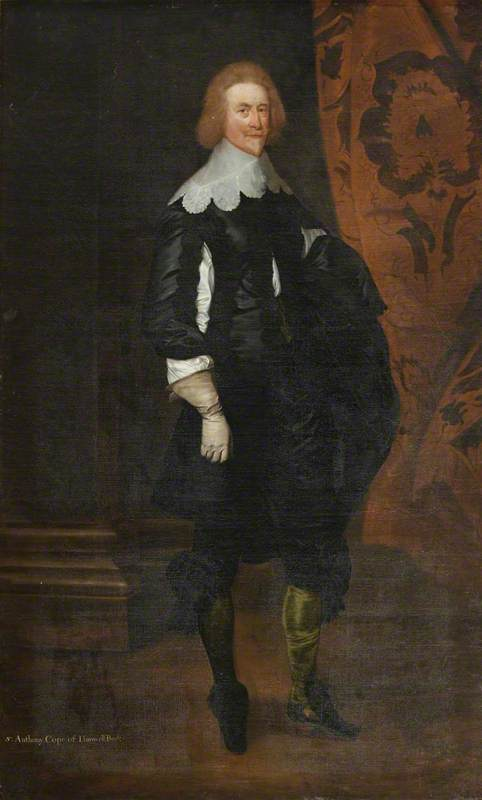
Sir Anthony Cope by Anthony van Dyck.

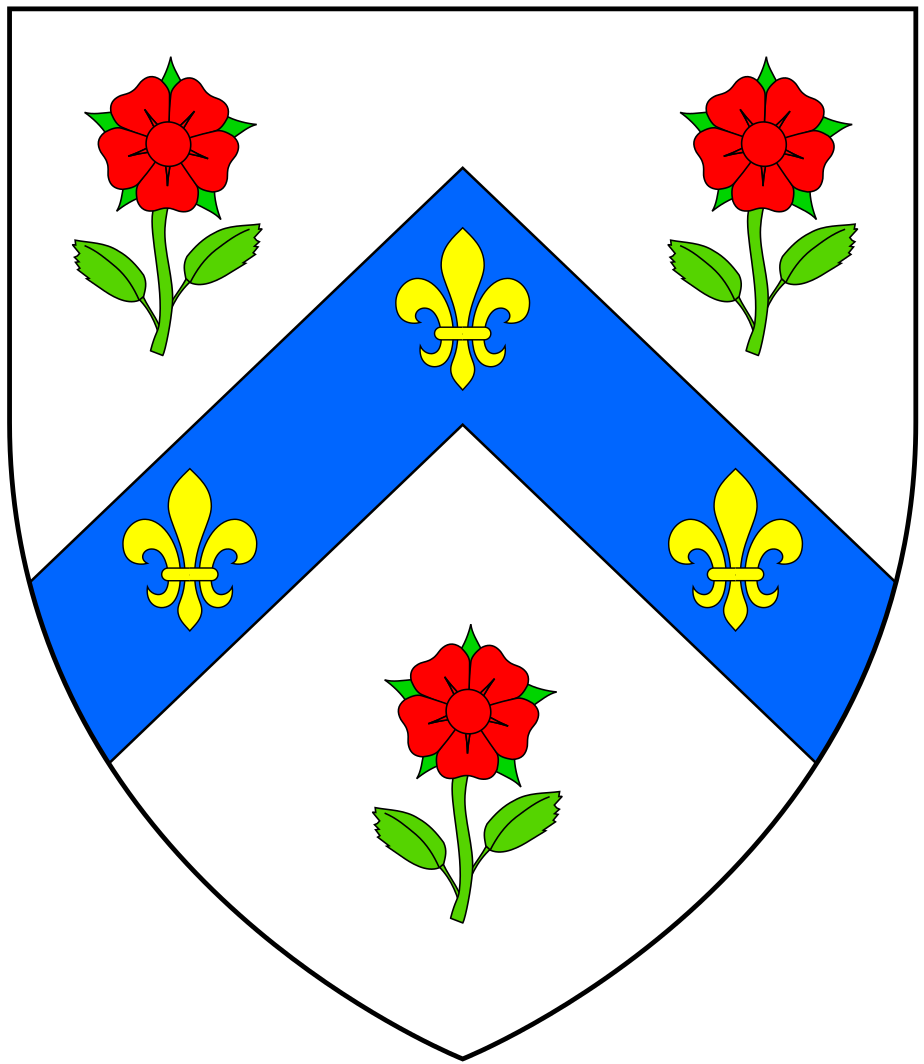
Arms of Cope of Hanwell: Argent, on a chevron azure between 3 roses gules slipped proper 3 fleurs-de-lys or

Sir Anthony Cope (c.1486 – 5 January 1551) of Hanwell, near Banbury, was an English knight, author, principal chamberlain to Queen Catherine Parr, and sheriff of Oxfordshire and Berkshire. According to genealogist Bernard Burke, Cope was one of the most learned men of his era.

== Origins ==
He was a younger son of William Cope (c.1440–1513), Knight, Cofferer of the Household to King Henry VII, by his second wife Jane (or Joan) Spencer, a member of the Spencer family.

According to most sources, William Cope had two wives:

- Agnes Harcourt, identified variously as the widow of Thomas Stonor, and daughter and heir of Sir Robert Harcourt, and as one of the five daughters and coheirs of Sir Robert Harcourt, standard-bearer of Henry VII at Bosworth, and mother of William Cope's eldest son and heir, Stephen Cope, esquire, who was Serjeant of the Poultry to Henry VIII, and married Anne Saunders, daughter and coheir of William Saunders of Oxfordshire, 'from whom the family at Bedhampton in Hampshire descended, that extinguished in daughters'.
- He married secondly, by 1496, Jane Spencer (d. 12 February 1526), sister of Thomas Spencer of Hodnell, Warwickshire, and daughter of John Spencer (died c.1496) of Hodnell by Anne Empson, sister of Sir Richard Empson. She was heir to her mother, Anne Empson. In 1506 William Cope sold his manors of Wormleighton and Fenny Compton to his wife's cousin, Sir John Spencer (d.1522), son of William Spencer of Snitterfield. At the time of her marriage to William Cope, Jane Spencer was the widow of William Saunders (died c.1493), by whom she had four daughters, Anne, Isabel, Joyce and Alice. Alice Saunders married John Cooke, esquire, of Gidea Hall, and was the mother of Sir Anthony Cooke (d. 11 June 1576) and Beatrix Cooke, who married Richard Ogle, esquire. In her will dated 20 January 1526 Jane (née Spencer) left bequests to Sir Anthony Cooke and his sister Beatrix.

By his second wife, Jane Spencer, William Cope had three sons:

- Anthony Cope, the subject of this biography.
- William Cope, who died unmarried.
- Sir John Cope (before 1513 – 22 January 1558) of Canons Ashby, Northamptonshire, who married firstly Bridget Raleigh, daughter of Edward Raleigh, esquire, of Farnborough, Warwickshire, by whom he had three sons, Erasmus, George and Anthony, and two daughters, Elizabeth and Joan; secondly Mary Mallory, widow of Clement Cave and daughter and coheiress of Nicholas Mallory, by whom he had no issue; and thirdly, before June 1542, Margaret Tame, widow of Sir Humphrey Stafford, and daughter and coheir of Sir Edmund Tame of Fairford, Gloucestershire, by his first wife Agnes Greville, daughter of John Greville, esquire, by whom he had no issue.

The monument to William Cope in Banbury church records the death of his widow, Jane, on 12 February 1525.

According to other sources, however, William Cope had three wives. Chambers says he married 'twice if not three times', and that his monument names his second and third wives Agnes and Jane, while a 'troublesome pedigree' from the Visitation of Hampshire shows a first wife, Barbara Quarles, daughter of George Quarles of Ufford, Northamptonshire, as the mother of his son, Stephen Cope. The online Dictionary of National Biography does not name William Cope's first two wives, but states that Anthony Cope was his 'second recorded son... by an unknown second wife', and that Anthony had 'at least one elder half-brother, Stephen, one brother, and four younger stepsisters (one of whom became Stephen's wife) who were the daughters of William Cope's third wife, Johane Spencer'.

== Career ==
Anthony Cope attended Oxford, perhaps Oriel Oxford as Anthony Wood states, but does not appear to have taken a degree. He subsequently travelled to France, Germany and Italy. During his time on the continent he visited several universities, and is said to have written a number of books at that time, which may have included translations from Galen and Hippocrates mentioned by Erasmus in 1516. Wood states that his writing were the subject of an epigram by Johannes Baptista Mantuanus, seen at the one time by John Bale, but now lost.

He was twenty-six years of age when his father died on 7 April 1513. He was heir to 'the manor of Hanwell, near Banbury, and other property near by'. He completed the building of Hanwell Hall, begun by his father. The Hall was later described by John Leland as 'a very pleasant and gallant house'.

In 1536, he was granted the lands of the dissolved Brooke Priory in Rutland, which he afterwards sold, and bought more property in Oxfordshire. He was engaged in a dispute with the vicar of Banbury in 1540, and received the commendation of the council for his conduct.

Cope had been a long time friend of the Parr family. He was master of the Queen's hawks to Queen Catherine Parr. He then became first vice-chamberlain, and then principal chamberlain to the Queen. Cope's duties for Catherine Parr included paying her goldsmiths, embroiderers, mercers, and her silkwoman Mistress Shakerley.

He was knighted by Edward VI on 24 November 1547, being appointed in the same year one of the royal visitors of Canterbury and other dioceses. In 1548 he served as sheriff of Oxfordshire and Berkshire.

== Marriage and issue ==
He married Jane Crewes, a daughter of Matthew Crewes of Pynne in the parish of Stockleigh English, Devon, by whom he had a son and daughter:

- Edward Cope (d.1557), who married Elizabeth Mohun (d.1587), daughter and heir of Walter Mohun of Wollaston, Northamptonshire, by whom he had four sons and three daughters, including his eldest son and heir Sir Anthony Cope, 1st Baronet, and Sir Walter Cope, second cousin of Lady Burghley and longtime servant of both William Cecil, 1st Baron Burghley, and his son, Robert Cecil, 1st Earl of Salisbury.
- Anne Cope, who married Sir Kenelm Digby of Drystoke, Rutland.

== Death and burial ==
He died on 5 January 1551, and was buried in the chancel of the parish church. His wife, to whom he bequeathed £100 and an annuity of 100 marks, survived him.

== Works ==
Cope was the author of:

- The Historie of the two moste noble Capitaines in the Worlde, Anniball and Scipio … gathered and translated into Englishe out of T. Livius and other authorities (black letter), Thomas Berthelet, London, 1544, also 1561, 1568 with date of colophon 1548, 1590, with three stanzas prefixed by Berthelet, and dedicatory preface to the king, in which reference is made to ‘youre most famous subduynge of the Romayne monster Hydra.’
- A Godly Meditacion upon XX. select and chosen Psalmes of the Prophet David … by Sir Anthony Cope, Knight (black letter), J. Day, 1547, reprinted with biographical preface and notes, 1848, by William H. Cope.

Among manuscripts at Bramshill were two ascribed to Cope—an abbreviated chronology and a commentary on the first two gospels dedicated to Edward VI.

== Notes ==
Political offices
Preceded by Sir Francis Englefield	High Sheriff of Berkshire and Oxfordshire; 1548–1549	Succeeded by Sir William Rainsford
