= Sir Anthony Cope, 1st Baronet =

English politician (c. 1548–1614)

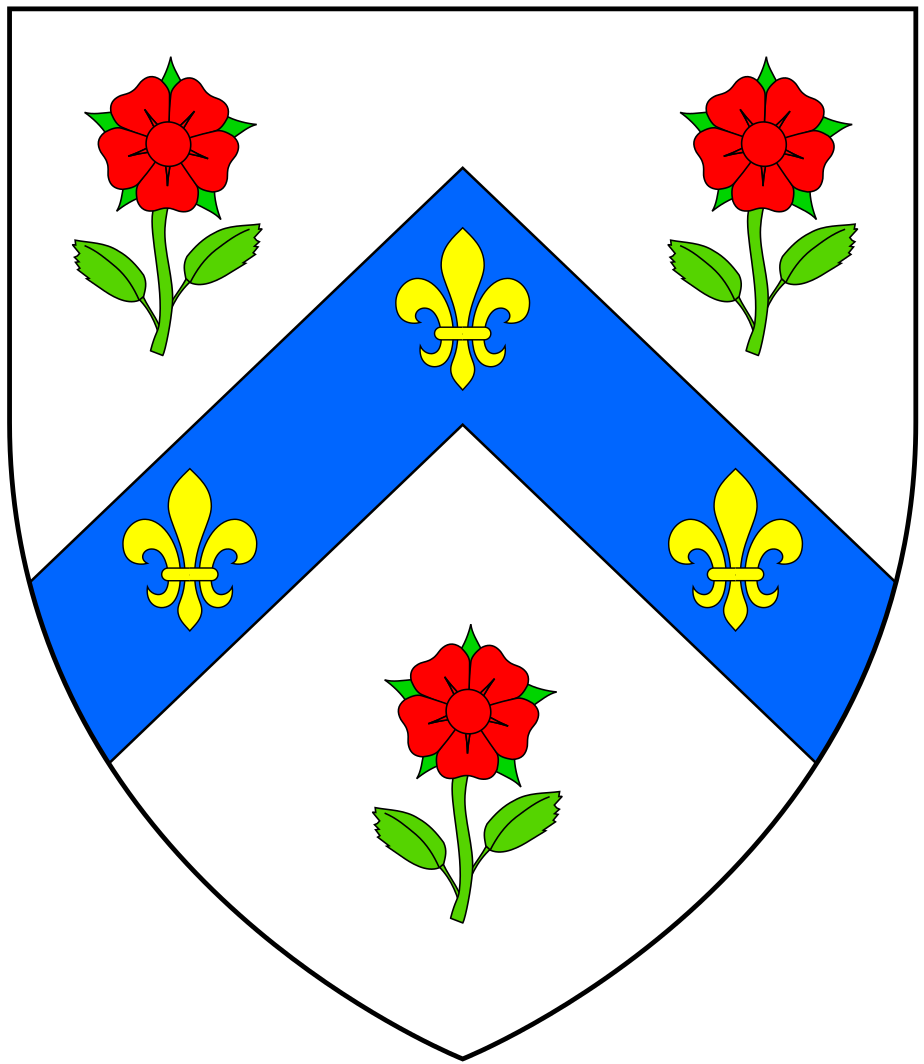
Arms of Cope of Hanwell: Argent, on a chevron azure between 3 roses gules slipped proper 3 fleurs-de-lys or

Sir Anthony Cope, 1st Baronet (c. 1548 – 6 July 1614) of Hanwell in Oxfordshire, was an English Puritan Member of Parliament.

== Origins ==
Anthony Cope was the second son of Edward Cope (d. 1557) (son of the author Anthony Cope (d. 1551)) by his wife Elizabeth Mohun (d. 1587), daughter and heiress of Walter Mohun of Wollaston, Northamptonshire. After his father's death, the wardship of Anthony then aged about 9, his three brothers and three sisters were acquired by his mother and her father, Walter Mohun. His younger brother was Sir Walter Cope. In 1561 his mother remarried (as his second wife) George Carleton (died 1590) of Walton-on-Thames, second son of John Carleton of Brightwell Baldwin, Oxfordshire, by his wife Joyce Welbeck, a daughter of John Welbeck of Oxon Hoath, Kent, by whom she had a son, Castle Carleton, and a daughter, Elizabeth Carleton. After the death of Elizabeth Mohun, George Carleton married, in 1589, Elizabeth Hussey, a daughter of Sir Robert Hussey of Linwood, Lincolnshire and widow of Anthony Crane (d. 1583). The first of the Marprelate tracts, Martin's Epistle, was printed in October 1588 at the house of Elizabeth Hussey at East Molesey, Surrey.

== Career ==
He was a Member of Parliament for Banbury in seven parliaments (1571–1583 and 1586–1604), and then represented Oxfordshire from 1604 until 1614. He served as Sheriff of Oxfordshire in 1581, 1590 and 1603. Cope was imprisoned in the Tower of London from 27 February to 23 March 1587 for presenting to the Speaker of the House of Commons a Puritan revision of the Book of Common Prayer and a bill abrogating existing canon law. Queen Elizabeth I knighted Cope in 1592–93 and King James I made him a baronet on 29 June 1611. Cope entertained James I at Hanwell, Oxfordshire in 1606 and 1612.

== Marriages and issue ==
He married twice:

- Firstly to his step-first cousin (niece of his step-father) Frances Lytton (d. 1600), a daughter of Sir Rowland Lytton of Knebworth, Hertfordshire, by his second wife Anne Carleton, a daughter of John Carleton of Brightwell Baldwin, by whom he had seven sons (four of whom lived to adulthood) and three daughters:
  - Sir William Cope, 2nd Baronet, MP for Banbury, who married his step-sister Elizabeth Chaworth, daughter of his father's second wife by her first husband (see below).
  - Anthony Cope, who settled in Ireland and was the ancestor of the Cope baronets of Bramshill, Hampshire.
  - Richard Cope, who settled in Ireland.
  - John Cope.
  - Anne Cope, who married Sir John Leigh.
  - Elizabeth Cope, who married Sir Richard Cecil (d.1633), second son of Thomas Cecil, 1st Earl of Exeter.
  - Mary Cope, who married Henry Champernown of Dartington in Devon.
- Secondly, on 7 April 1600, he married Anne Paston (1553–1637), a daughter of Sir William Paston, and widow successively of Sir George Chaworth and Sir Nicholas Le Strange. There were no children from the marriage. Anne's daughter Elizabeth Chaworth, by her first husband, married her step-brother Sir William Cope, 2nd Baronet.

== Death and burial ==
Cope died on 6 July 1614 and was buried at Hanwell. His funeral sermon was preached by Robert Harris.

== Notes ==
Baronetage of England
New creation	Baronet (of Hanwell); 1611–1615	Succeeded by William Cope
