= Cope baronets of Osbaston (1918) =

Escutcheon of the Cope baronets of Osbaston

The Cope baronetcy of Osbaston, Leicestershire was created for Thomas Cope of Osbaston Hall, in the Baronetage of the United Kingdom on 6 February 1918. He was a barrister, magistrate and Chairman of Leicestershire County Council. The title was extinct on the death of his son in 1966, who left no heir.

== Cope baronets, of Osbaston (1918) ==
- Sir Thomas Cope, 1st Baronet (1840–1924)
- Sir Thomas George Cope, 2nd Baronet (1884–1966)
