= Oxfordshire Ironstone Railway =

Coordinates: 52°04′N 1°24′W

The Oxfordshire Ironstone Railway was a standard-gauge industrial railway that served an ironstone quarry near the village of Wroxton in Oxfordshire.

== History ==
The OIR linked the quarry with the Great Western Railway about 6 kilometres (3.7 mi) to the east at a junction just north of Banbury. The line was opened between 1917 and 1919 and closed in 1967; the track was removed between 1967 and 1968. The quarry was heavily worked in the Second World War. The line also served the Banbury Alcan works at one point. The popular footpath from Drayton to Drayton Lodge crossed the railway at Drayton Crossing.

Wroxton Central Ironstone Quarry was opened by 1919, closed and filled in 1967. Langley Ironstone Quarry was built near Balscot by 1926, and was closed and filled during 1943 when it ran out of ironstone. Dyke Lane Bridge was built in 1940 as the line travelled south to dig out the quarry that is now today's Alkerton tip between 1941 and 1949. Dyke Lane Bridge was abandoned in 1967 and is now run by the same state authorities as the road on it is.

The line was extended to the Balscote Quarry which was worked between 1956 and its closure in 1967. Balscote Quarry, a shorter-lived working, was built by 1956, but closed and filled in 1967. A newer quarry close by its former site is now served by road haulage only.

The mine buildings, manager's house and workers' halt are now a small set of new light industrial buildings, built circa 2006–2008. The track works' permanent way huts (p-huts) still stood at Drayton in 2007 and Horley in 2002. A few old OIR fence posts/gates remain to this day along the route. Banbury's Ruscote and Hardwick estate's (Daimler Avenue, Devon Way and Longelandes Way) are also built over a large part of its route, including most of the former Pen Hill farm grading works (Longelandes Way). Other built over places include the proposed minor Pin Hill maintenance depot (Pin Hill Road) and major active Pen Hill maintenance depot (Beaumont Road). Despite the development that has occurred north of Banbury since closure, much of the line of the route can be walked today.

== Locomotive fleet ==
The OIR operated its own fleet of 0-6-0T and 0-6-0ST steam locomotives built by Hunslet, Hudswell Clarke, Peckett & Sons and 0-4-0STs built by Hudswell Clarke, Hunslet, W. G. Bagnall and Peckett & Sons. There was also a vertical boiler locomotive supplied by Sentinel. The earliest locos carried names associated with Oxford University such as "The President" and "The Dean". Later locos carried boys and girls names, typically the 0-6-0 locos had male names eg "Graham" and "Frank" and the 0-4-0 locos had female names eg "Betty" and "Jean".

In the 1960s, the railway also purchased thirteen Rolls-Royce Sentinel diesel-hydraulic locomotives fitted with Rolls-Royce C range engines. Several of these Sentinel locomotives are still in existence, with "Betty", "Jean" and "Graham" at the Rocks By Rail Museum, "Barabel" at the Nene Valley Railway, and "Joan" at the East Somerset Railway. All five preserved locomotives are in operational condition.

== Local geology ==
Many heavy clay and Ironstone deposits surround Banbury and Wroxton.

== The Edge Hill Light Railway connection ==
The firm behind the Oxfordshire Ironstone Railway was one of the backers of the ill-fated 1920–1922 Edge Hill Light Railway.

There was talk of reopening the Edge Hill Light Railway early in World War II but the Oxfordshire Ironstone line was considered adequate to serve the area's requirements.

== See also ==
- History of Banbury
- Clay pit
- Ironstone

== Books ==
- Tonks, Eric (April 1988). The Ironstone Quarries of the Midlands Part 2: The Oxfordshire Field. Cheltenham: Runpast Publishing. p. 146. ISBN 1-870-754-026.

== Historic imagery of the site ==
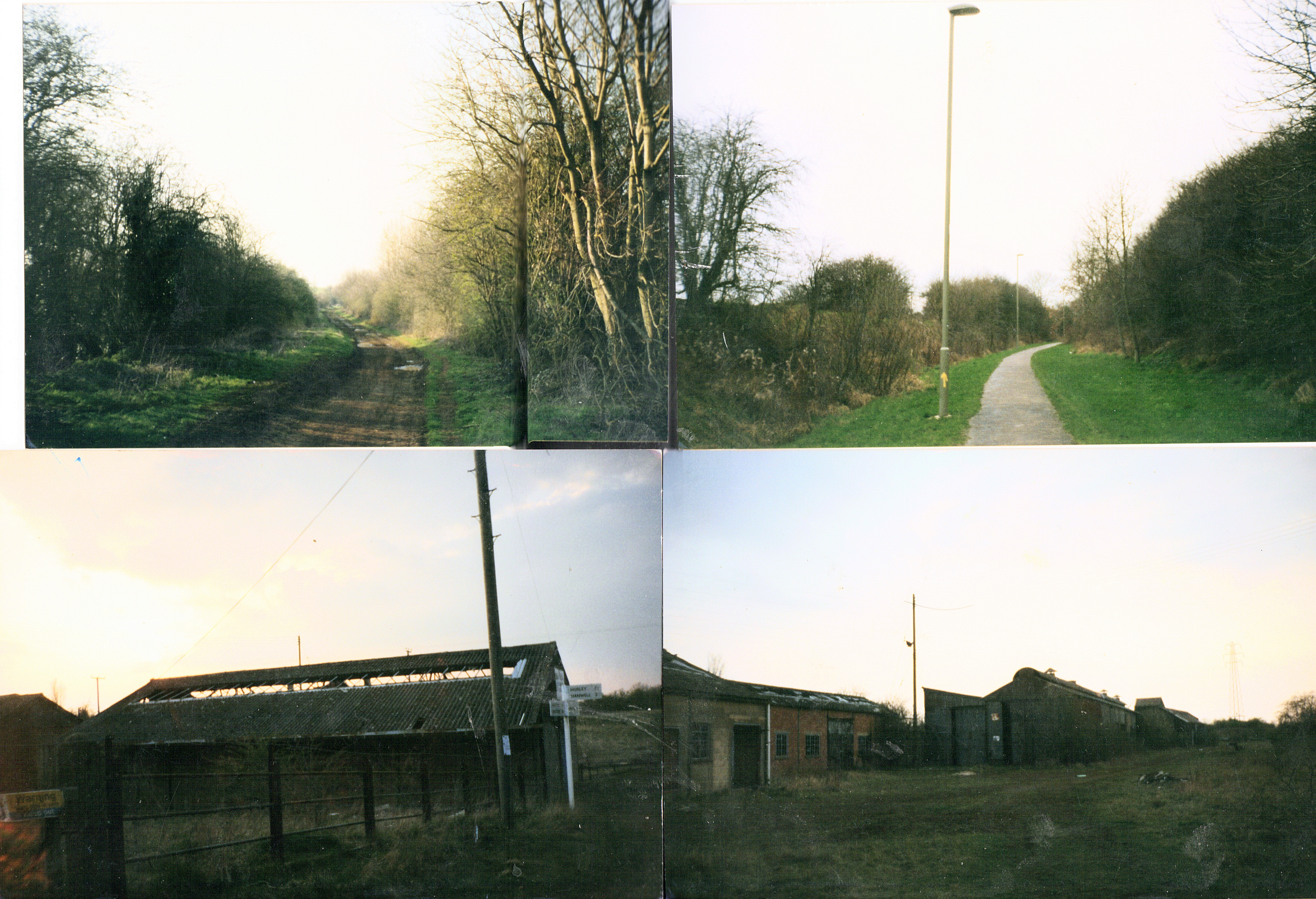
The former Wroxton Quarry in Oxfordshire. Top left is the trackbed between Drayton and Horley, right is the trackbead in Hardwick and the bottom is the old mine itself during the year 2001.

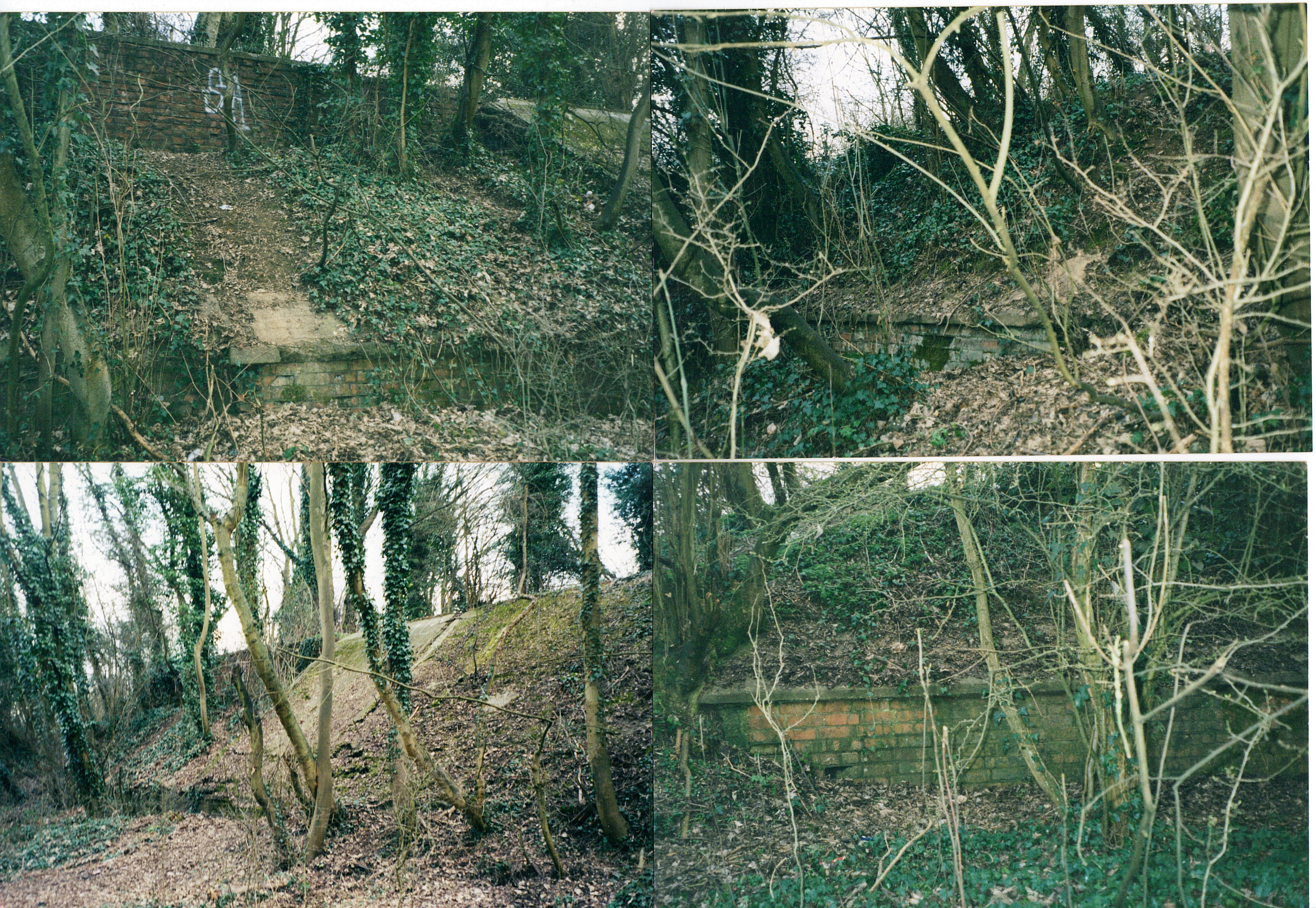
The former Wroxton Quarry's Pin Hill farm grading works in Banbury, Oxfordshire, in 2001

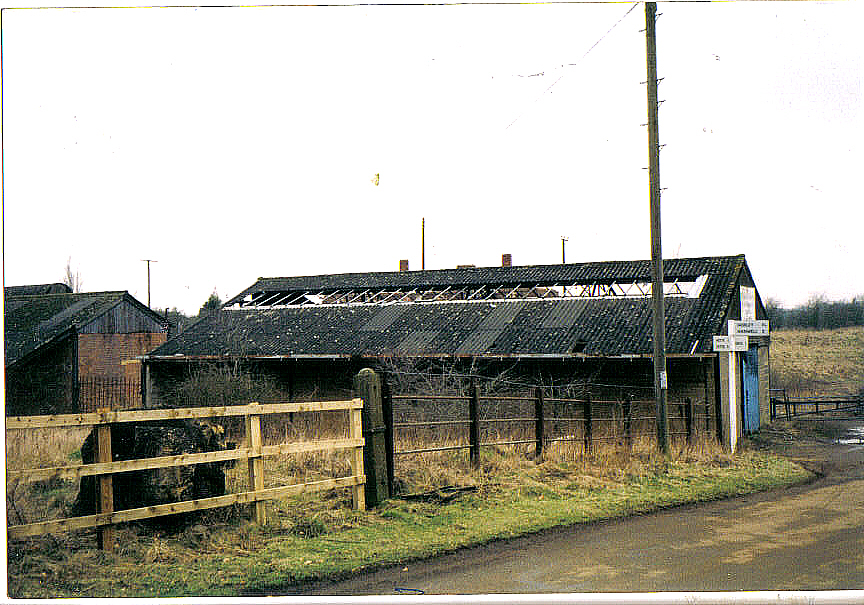
The former ironstone quarry works at Wroxton in 2001

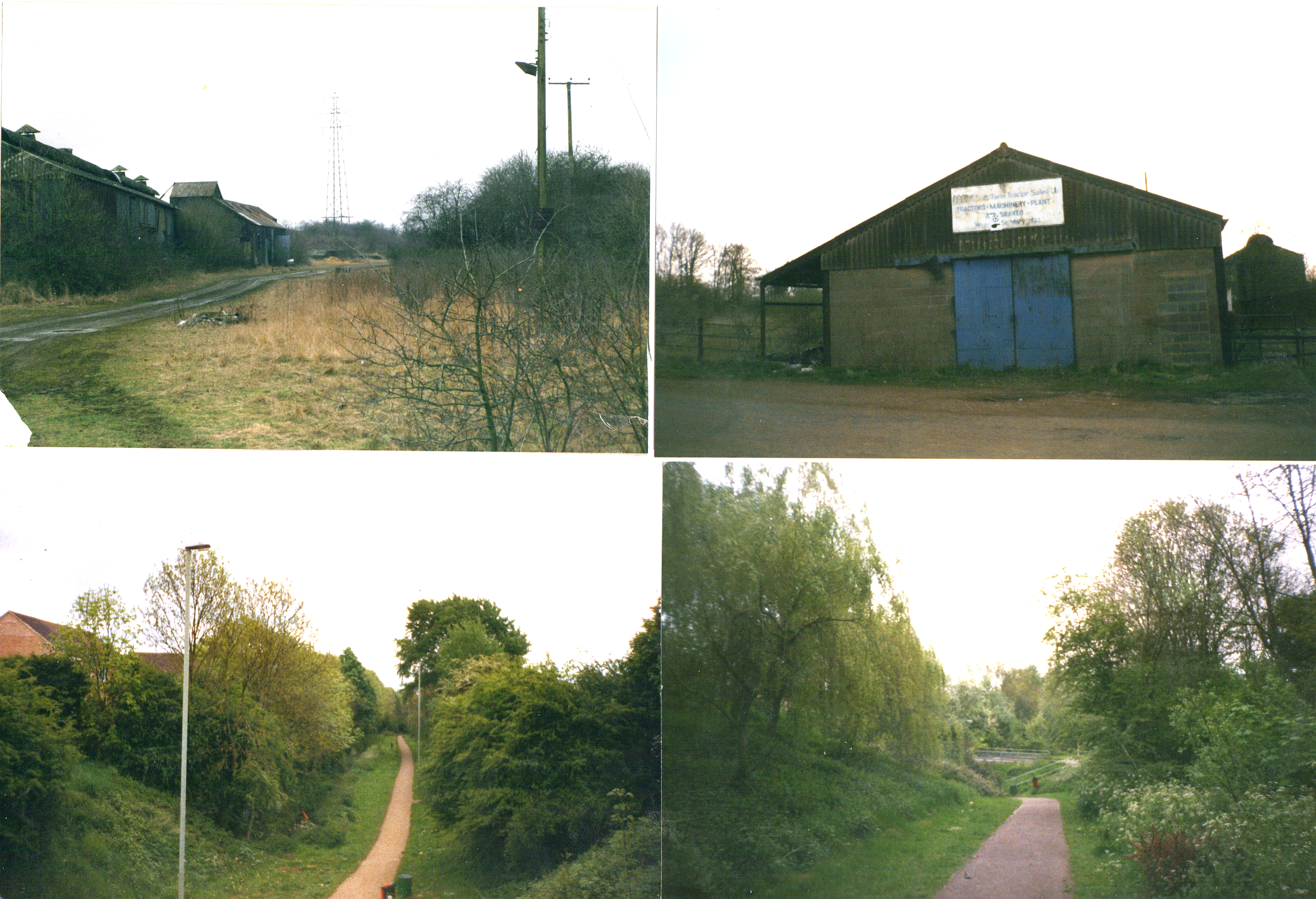
The surviving huts at the former quarry in 2001 and the track bed in Hardwick during 2001

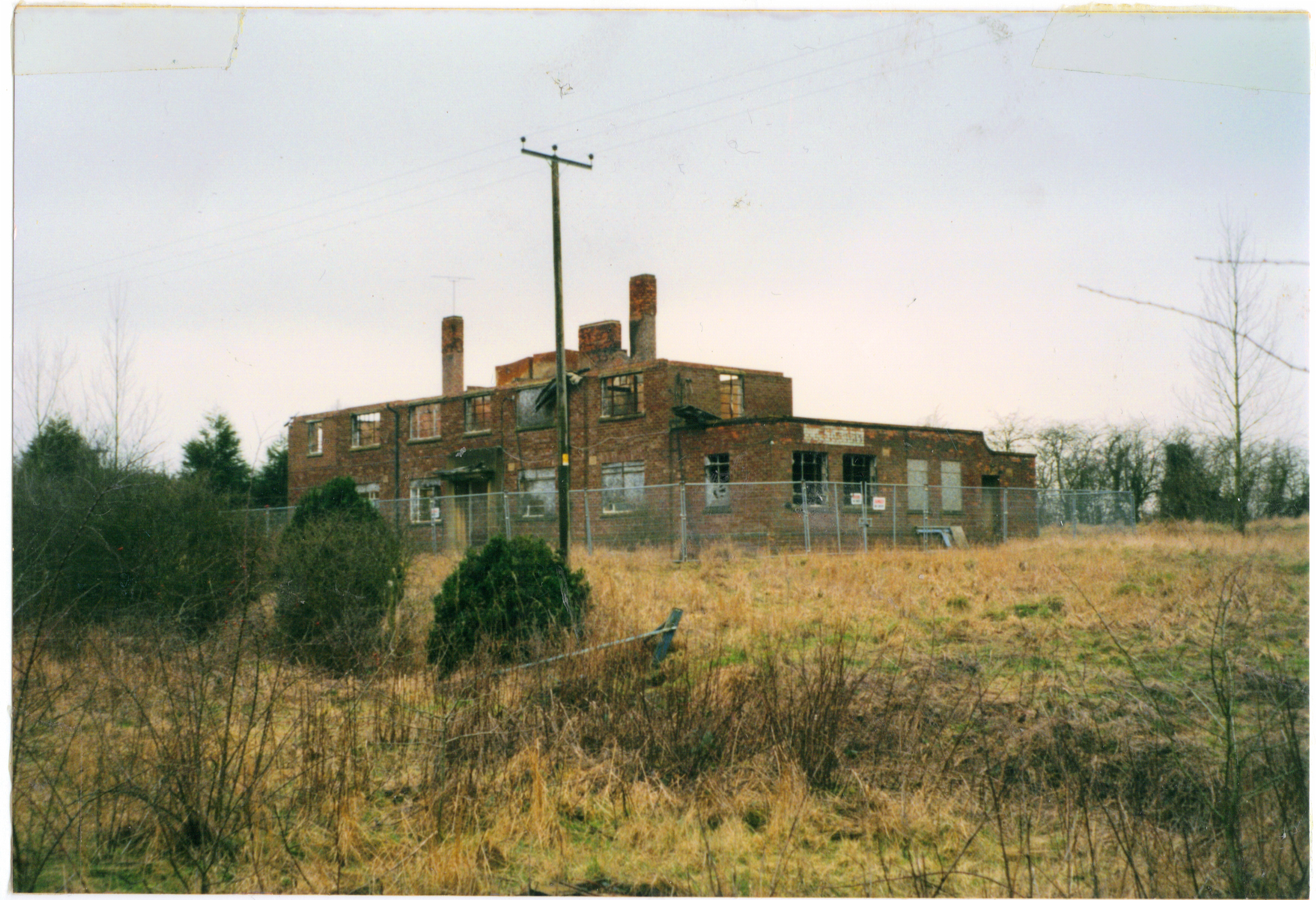
The mine manager's office in 2001

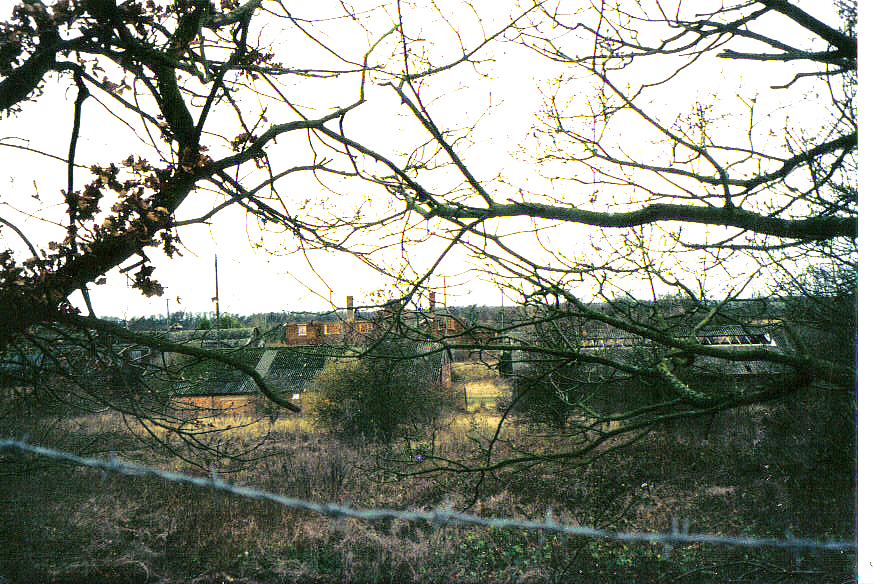
The former ironstone quarry works at Wroxton in 2001

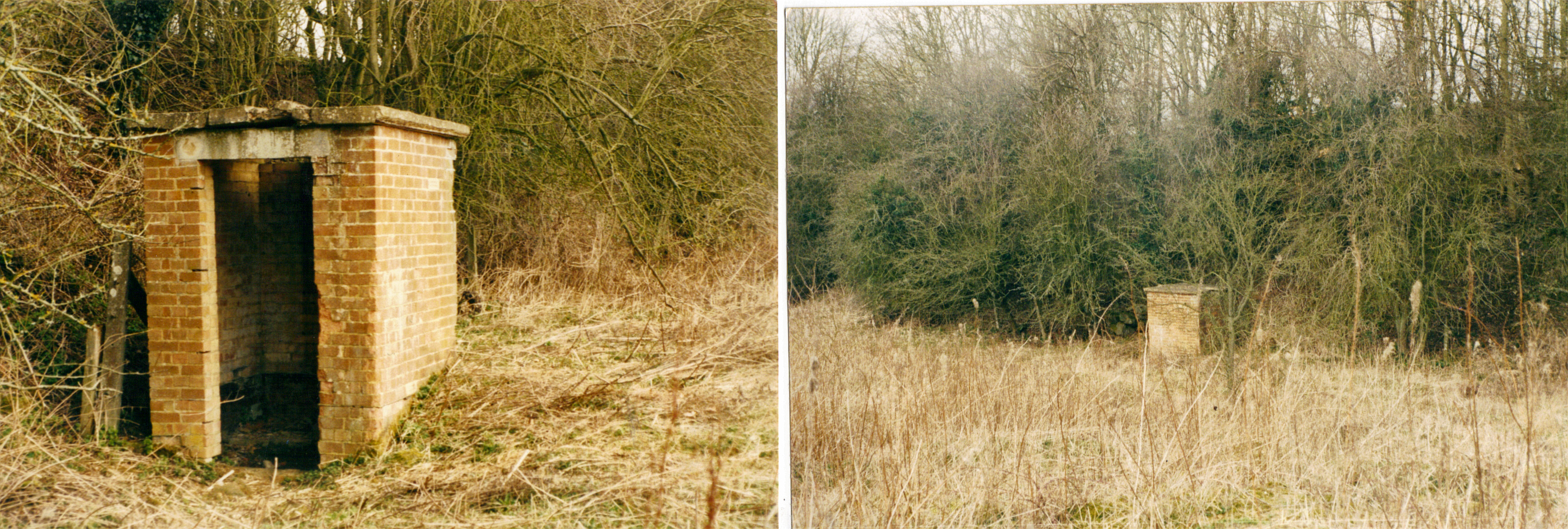
Drayton's OIR mine's tool shed or possible staff privy in 2003

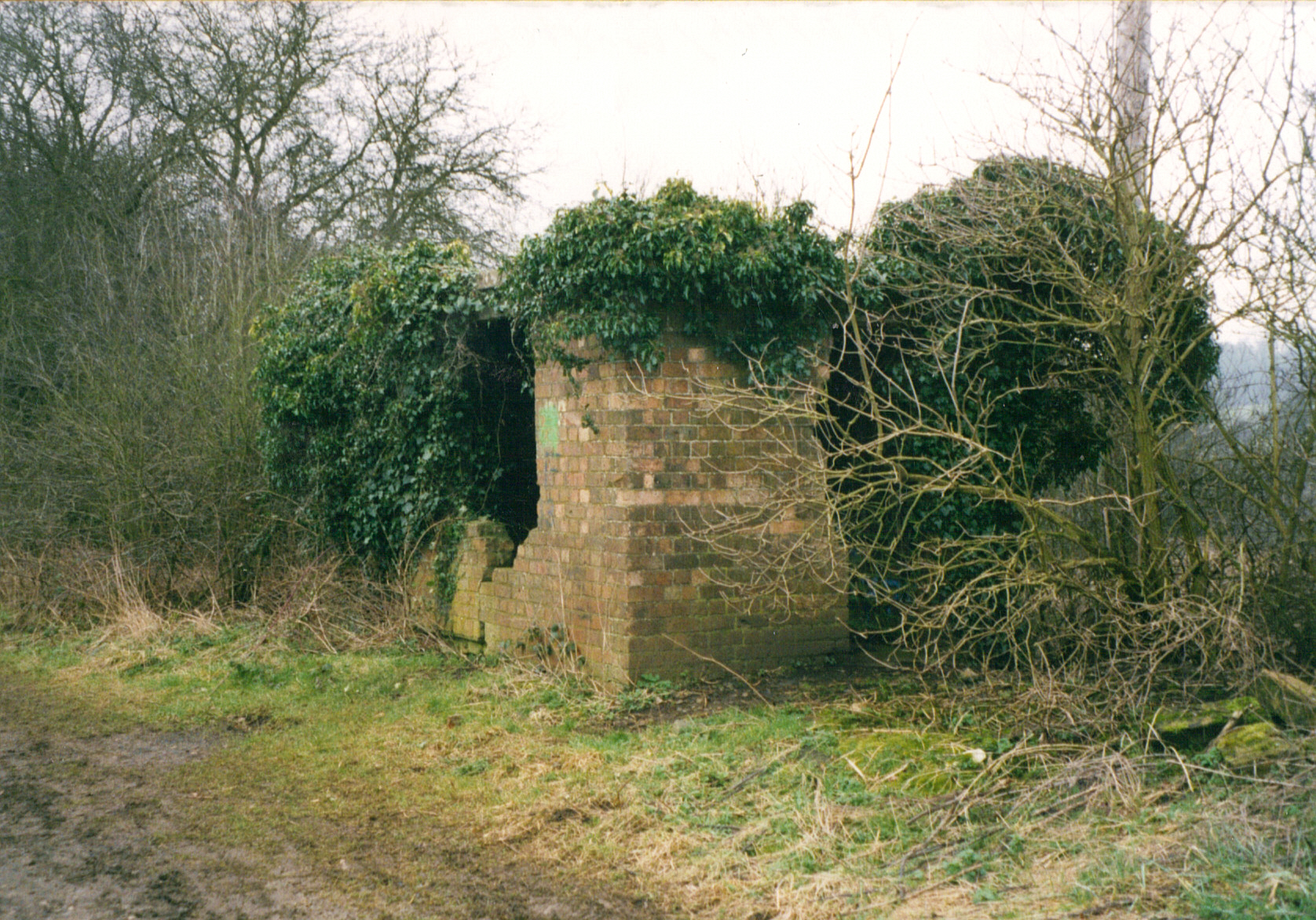
Oxfordshire Ironstone Railway's OIR P-hut at Drayton, Oxfordshire in 2005. At the far right is a pile of rubble was ware a signal post used to be.

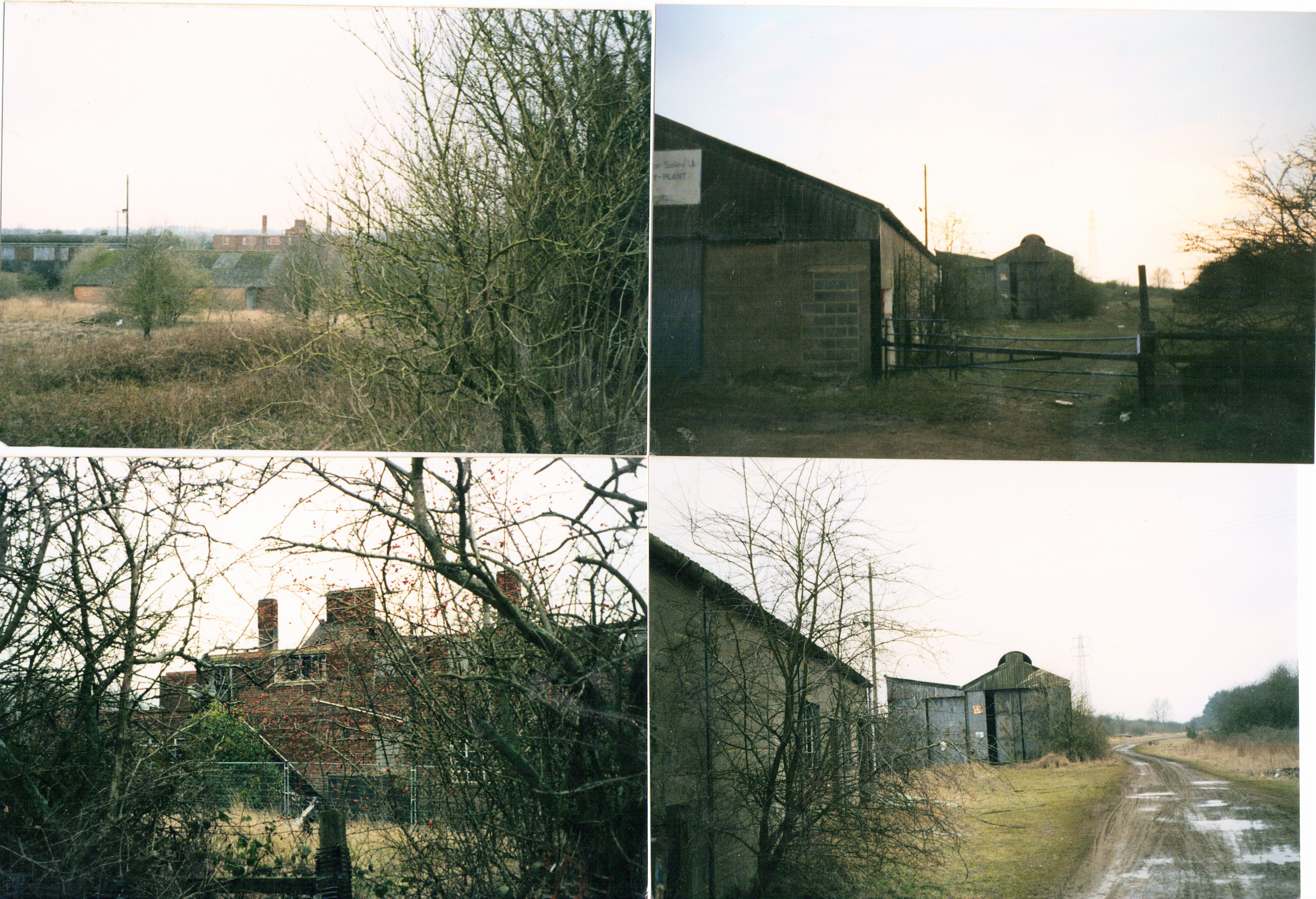
Wroxton's old ironstone mine in 2001

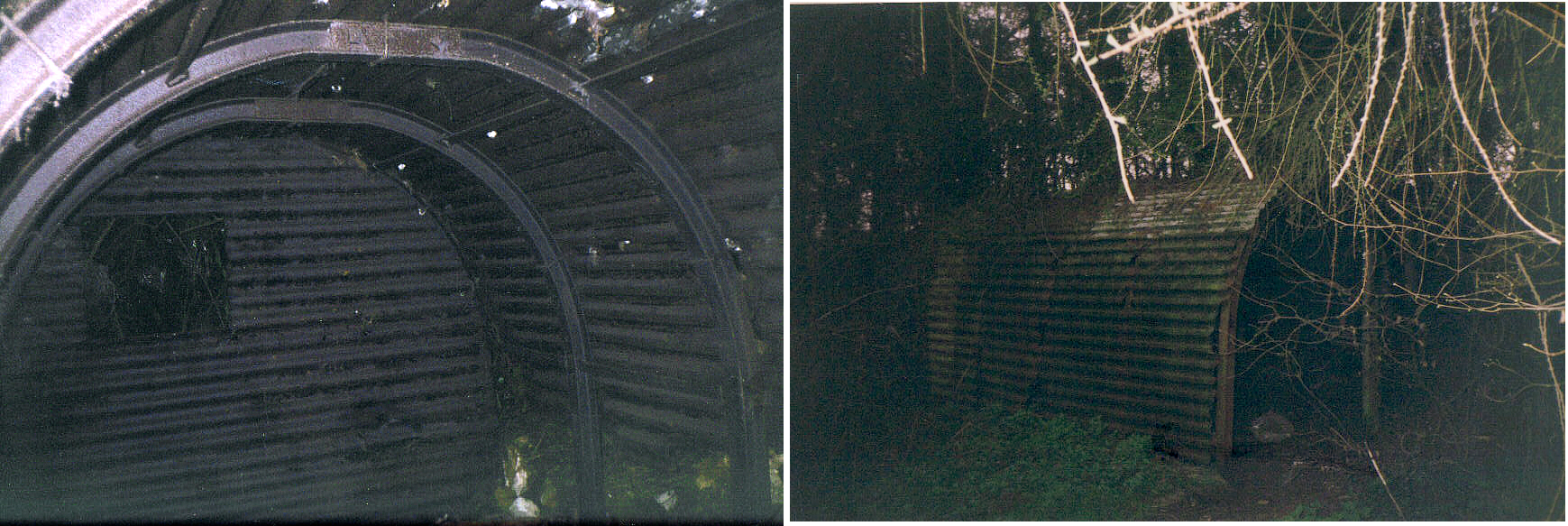
Horley's OIR tool hut or a p-hut in 2001 outside and 2002 inside. It's overgrown and in the bushes now.

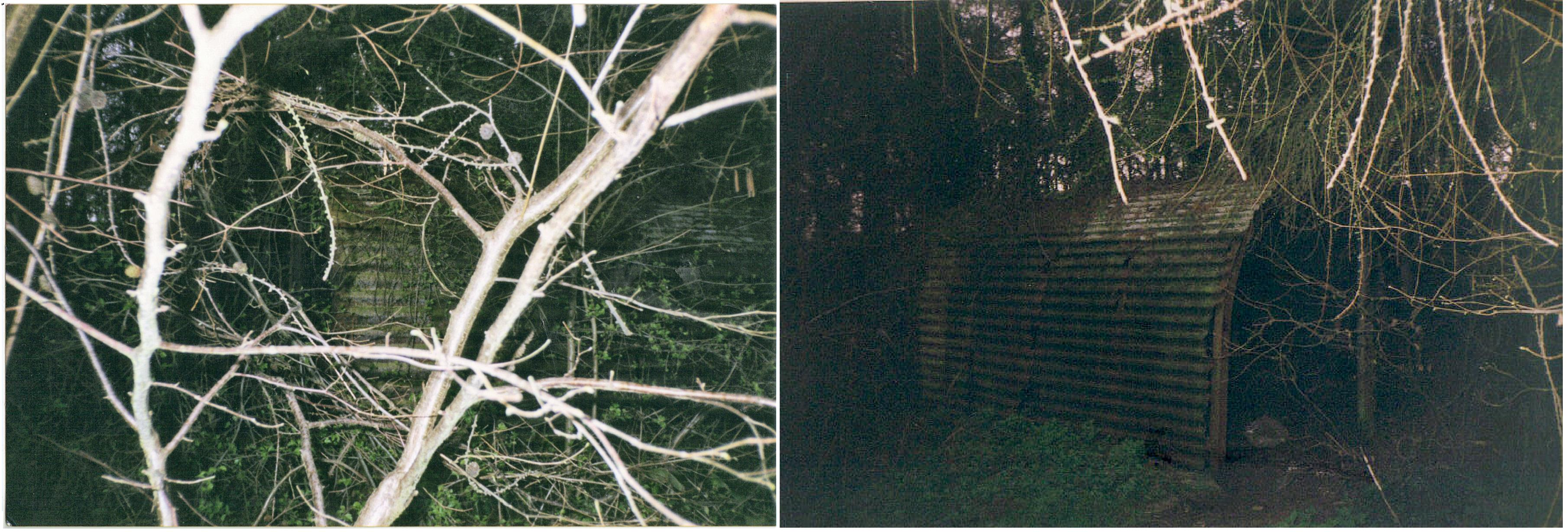
Both sides of Horley's OIR tool hut or a p-hut in 2001. It's overgrown and in the bushes now.

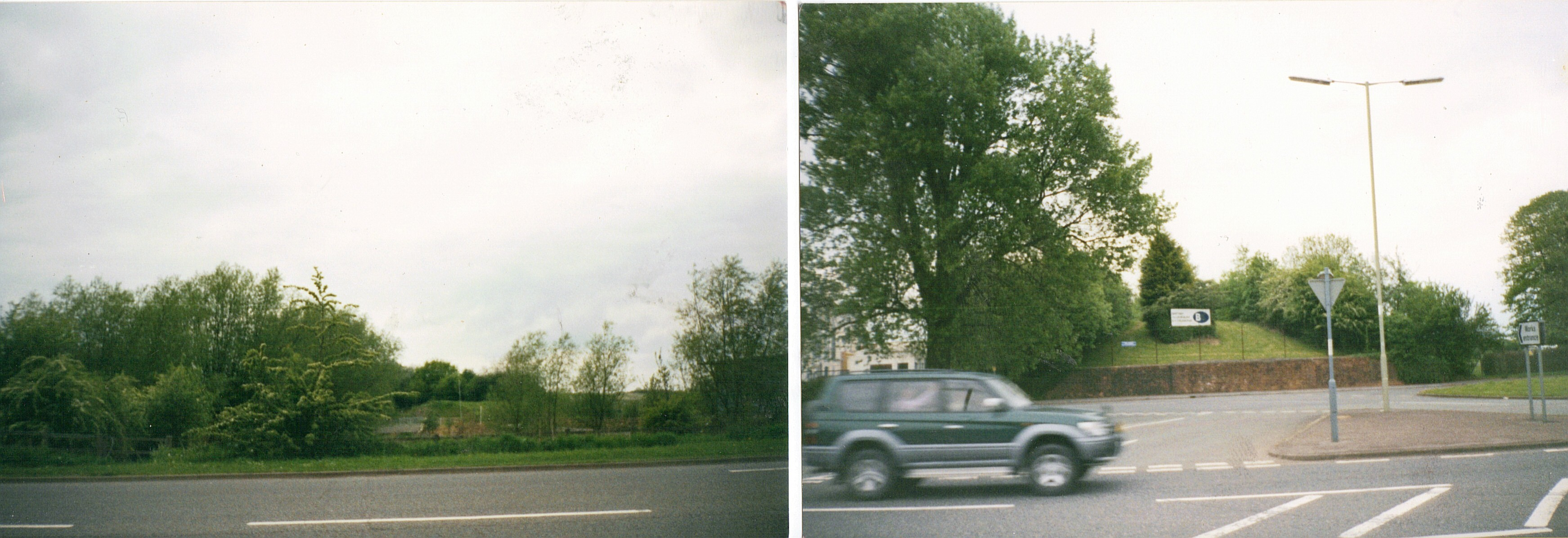
The former OIR bridge supports by the former Alcan works in Banbury in 2001

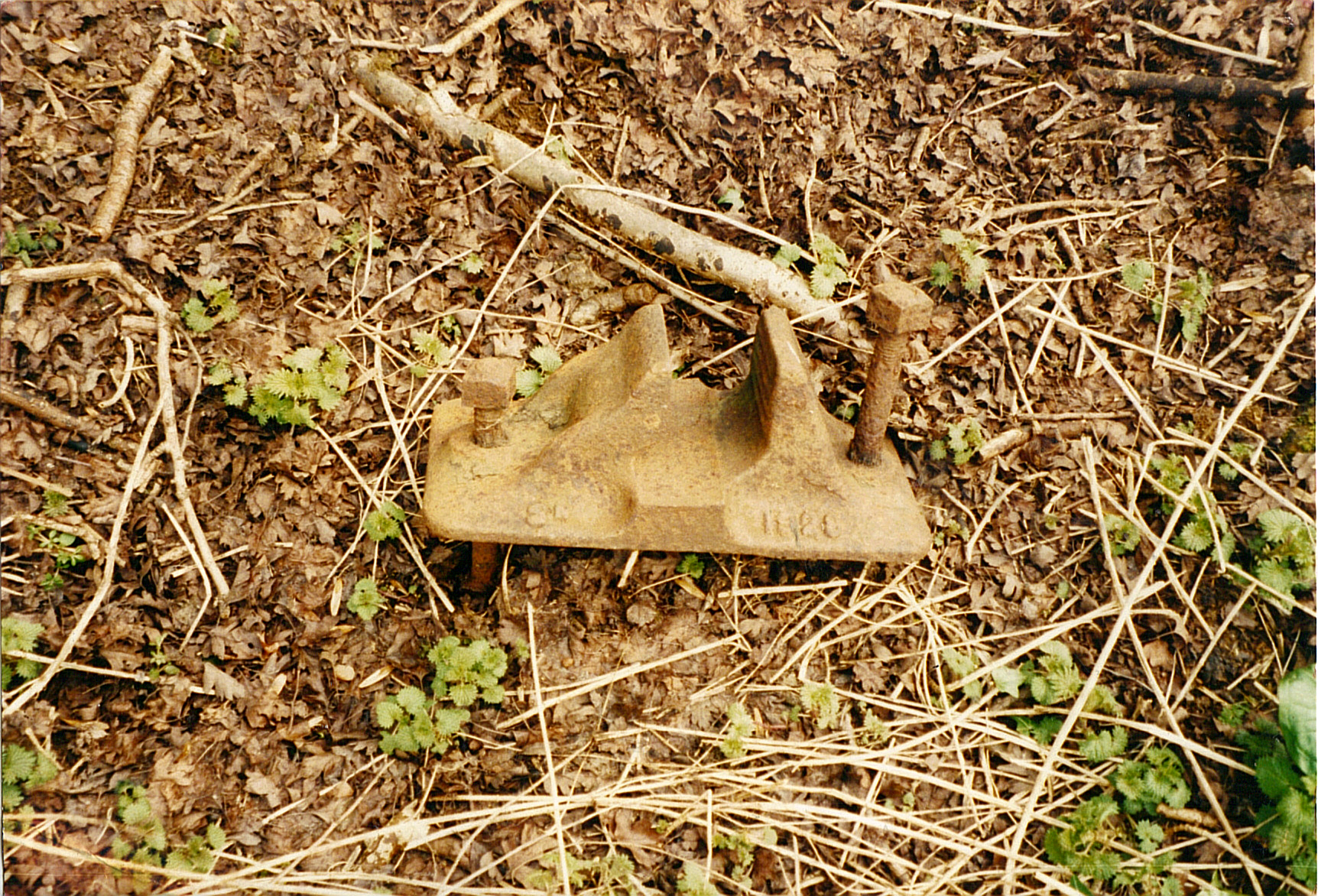
An OIR track to sleeper pin in Drayton. The words stamped on it say it was made by the Great Western Railway in 1928. It was found in 2002.

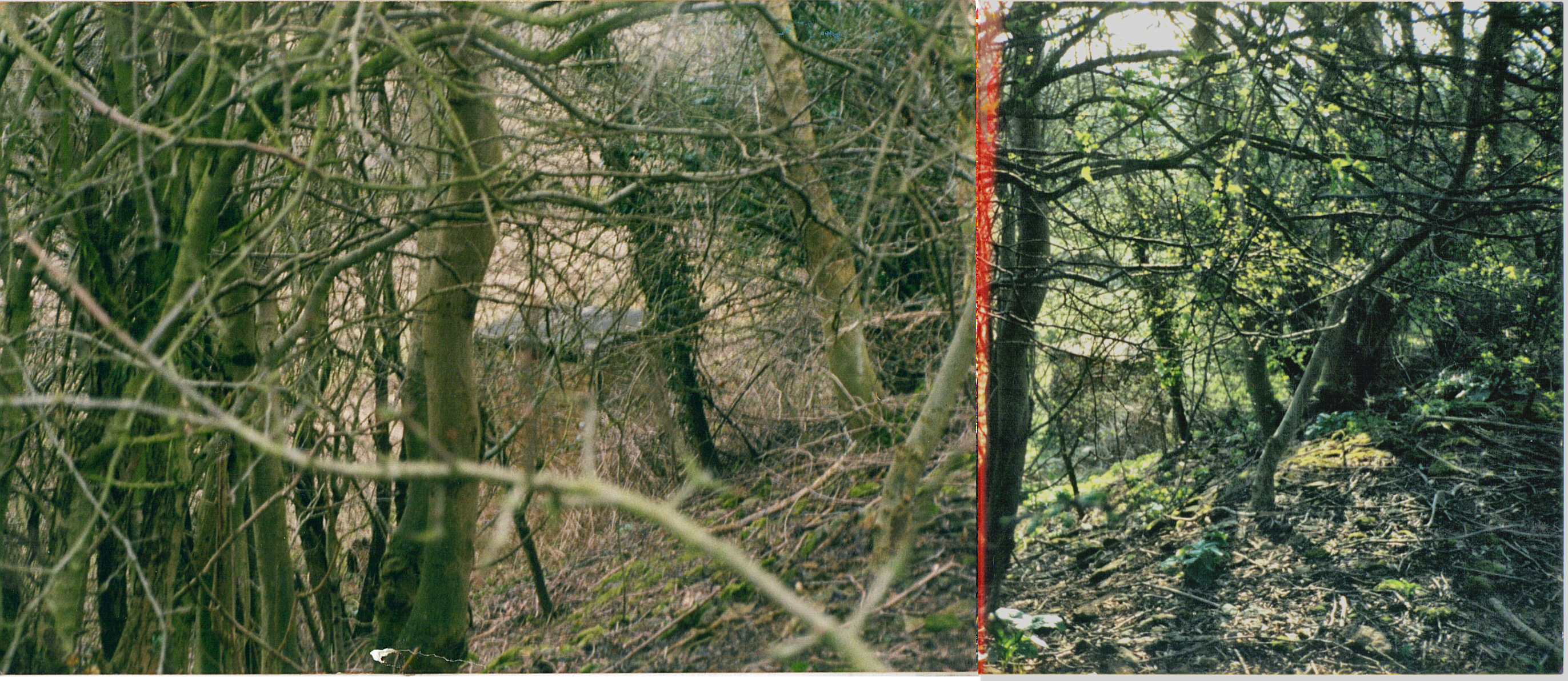
Drayton's OIR tool shed in 2004

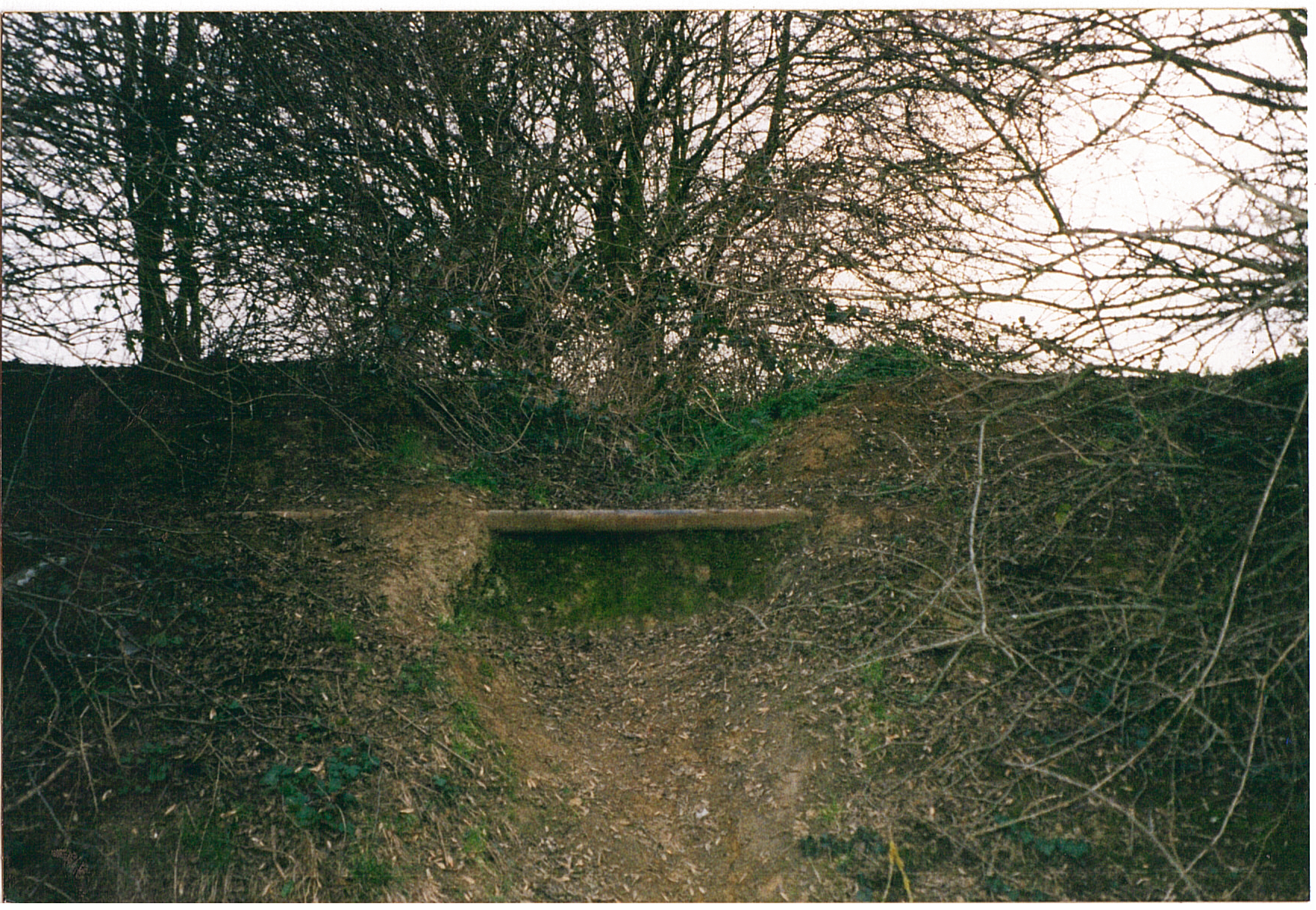
A broken old pipe in Hardwick. It is not part of any mains system I know of and looks very old and corroded, so it was probably part of the OIR's grading works.
