= Wykham Park Academy =

Location
- Ruskin Road; Banbury, Oxfordshire, OX16 9HY; England; 52°03′01″N 1°20′38″W

Information
- Type: Academy
- Local authority: Oxfordshire County Council
- Trust: Aspirations Academies Trust
- Department for Education URN: 138499 Tables
- Ofsted: Reports
- Principal: Carly Berry
- Gender: Coeducational
- Age: 11 to 18
- Enrolment: 985
- Website: http://www.wykhampark-aspirations.org/

Wykham Park Academy is a coeducational academy school situated on Ruskin Road, in the Easington ward of Banbury, Oxfordshire, England. The school has a sixth form. Formerly Banbury School, it has been an academy since 2012, originally under the name of Banbury Academy. In September 2018, the school changed its name to Wykham Park Academy Banbury.

== History ==
Wykham Park Academy used to be three separate schools. These were:

- Stanbridge Hall (the former grammar school)
- Wykham Hall
- Broughton Hall

Before the school's name was changed to Banbury Grammar School in 1946, it was called Banbury County School and was a mixed school for boys and girls from the ages of 11 to 18/19. It was founded in 1893. Wykham Hall was built in about 1953 and was called Easington Modern Boys' School. When the schools merged they became Banbury School, with Harry Judge as the founding Principal. The school became an academy, originally called Banbury Academy, on 1 August 2012.

== Banbury and Drayton merger proposal ==
In April 2003, there was a proposal which suggested that Banbury School and Drayton School should be merged as one school, while Blessed George Napier Roman Catholic School, which is situated next to Banbury School, would move to the site of Drayton School. The idea met with opposition from many in the local community because it would have meant an increase in journey time for those students who attend Drayton School. Many argued that it would mean a loss of parental choice and would mean that Banbury School would lose its identity. As a result, the proposed merger was rejected.

== New building programme ==
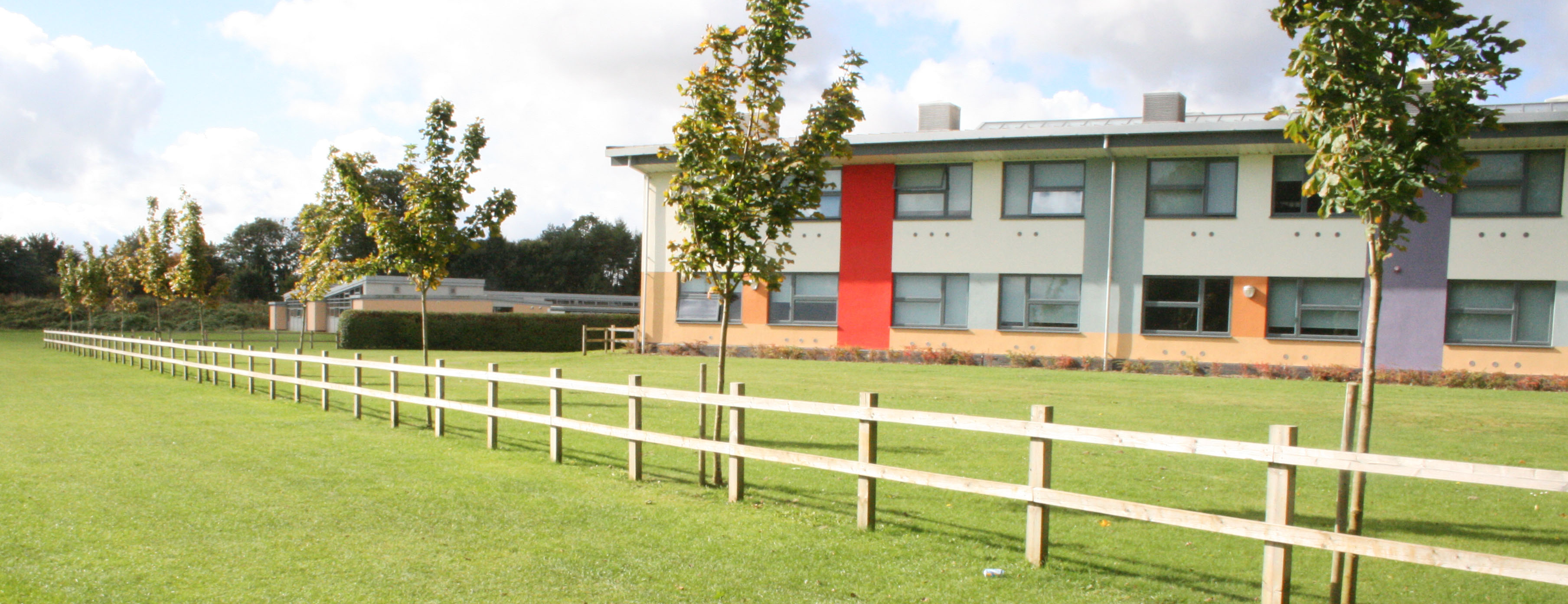
The new Stanbridge building at Wykham Park Academy from the south

Oxfordshire County Council spent £6 million on a new two-storey, V-shaped building to replace the old Stanbridge building. The New Stanbridge building was officially opened on 13 March 2009 by Michael Gove MP, Shadow Secretary of State for Children, Schools and Families and includes the English, Maths, Humanities, Languages, RE, IT and Business departments, with 28 classrooms. The old building and some associated land was subsequently sold, causing local controversy.

== Notable alumni ==
- Faisal Khalid (born 1985), cricketer

=== Banbury School ===
- Stephen Frost, with brothers Simon and Matthew, actor known for the Carling Black Label adverts in the late 1980s

=== Banbury Grammar School ===
- John Baines Johnston, former High Commissioner to Rhodesia from 1963–65
- John Herbert Long, music teacher

== Former teachers ==
yh

=== Banbury Grammar School ===
- Anthony Burgess, lived in Adderbury, English teacher from 1950 to 1954, ran school drama productions, later wrote A Clockwork Orange in 1962
