= Drayton School =

Location
- Drayton Road; Banbury, Oxfordshire, OX16 0UD; England; 52°04′18″N 1°22′02″W

Information
- Type: Comprehensive school
- Established: 1973
- Closed: 2007 (replaced by North Oxfordshire Academy)
- Local authority: Oxfordshire
- Ofsted: Reports
- Gender: Coeducational
- Age: 11 to 16
- Enrolment: 650 (approx.)

Drayton School was a comprehensive school situated on Stratford Road in Banbury, Oxfordshire, England. Established in 1973, its buildings are now occupied by the North Oxfordshire Academy which replaced Drayton School in 2007.

== Overview ==
Location of Drayton School in Oxfordshire

The school was opened in 1973 to help relieve the pupil demand for the oversubscribed Banbury School. In its first year, it was called Drayton Hall as it was affiliated to Banbury School. In 1974, it gained independent status and was renamed Drayton School. Drayton was built in three stages. The first stage was building the main "H" building, where the majority of subjects are taught. The second stage was building the Food Department and the extension of the "H" building, which included a theatre, and the English block (which used to be the maths block).

The school made local headlines in 1982 when pupils staged a rooftop protest in response to a teachers' strike.

== OFSTED reports ==
In December 1997, Drayton was put in Special Measures by Ofsted following a poor inspection. Drayton was at the bottom of the league table for Oxfordshire, reaching an all-time low of 9% of pupils getting 5 or more A*-C grades in their GCSEs.

=== Improvement drive ===
Throughout the Special Measures period, the school received regular visits by Her Majesty's Inspectors of Schools (HMI), who monitored progress closely. By 2001, weaknesses in the curriculum and in teaching and learning had been addressed and HMI judged the school to have improved enough to be removed from Special Measures.

As a result of the improvements between 1999 and 2001, the school received a ‘School Achievement Award’ in 2002. In the same year Drayton joined the "Specialist School and Academies Trust".

In April 2003 Oxfordshire County Council wanted to amalgamate Banbury School and Drayton School together in the Banbury School and Blessed George Napier Roman Catholic site. Blessed George Napier Roman Catholic School wanted to move to the Drayton School site as the school was over-subscribed.

However, in the face of opposition, due to the improved local reputation of the school, the County Council abandoned this proposal at an executive meeting in October 2003. The council called for ‘a fuller, and hopefully more conclusive, report’ on the future of education in the Banbury area 'by early 2004'.

However no such report has been put in the public domain and it is not clear how far options being considered at the time were explored. These included the formation of a joint campus with the local Oxford and Cherwell College.

In 2003, Drayton had a successful Ofsted inspection. Due to the improved local reputation of the school, recruitment had improved, with the number of students recruited in 2002 showing a 15% rise over previous years. Recruitment continued to improve after 2002, although not at such a high rate. In this period, the school was oversubscribed.

In addition to student recruitment, teacher recruitment had also become much easier, due to the improved reputation of the school. However, the proposal by Oxfordshire County Council to amalgamate Drayton School with Banbury School reversed much of the progress that had been made. The future of the school was once again perceived as being uncertain, which made Drayton less attractive for both prospective parents and teachers.

Examination results also improved during this period. For example, the results of the SAT tests the students take at age 14 improved in 2003. In 2004 the number of students achieving at least one GCSE reached an all-time record of 100%.

== September 2004 onwards ==
In September 2004, Richard Sutton came to Drayton School as the new headteacher. He made changes to the school, which included changing the values and ethos of the school, and also developing and implementing ideas on how Drayton could be improved.

As a result, in Summer 2005, all corridors were re-painted, interactive whiteboards replaced whiteboards, and a further new ICT room was installed. Also, at the same time, Drayton achieved an all-time record of having 95% of the pupils having 5 A*-Gs.

After the refurbishment, Drayton was one of the few schools in Oxfordshire to have achieved a "Healthy Oxfordshire Schools" award set by Oxfordshire County School.

In Summer 2006, Drayton achieved another all-time record since it opened. Students who had benefited from an improved quality of education in their lower years at the school, since their arrival in 2001, took their GCSEs. Drayton now had 32% of pupils achieving 5 A*–Cs.

== School uniform ==
When the school first opened, due to its affiliation with Banbury School it adopted their standard uniform of blue/grey/white. When it gained independence in 1974/75, it introduced a new uniform of red/grey/black/white. The school tie was red with a small black Banbury Cross motif. However, over the following three years, the uniform policy was modified to allow any plain-coloured jumper. This was the start of the relaxation of rules regarding dress code, and by 1977/78 the uniform policy had been completely abandoned. A uniform was re-introduced in the early 1990s consisting of a black sweatshirt and blazer. However, in September 2001, Drayton decided to change the sweatshirt to blue, with a Drayton School badge. The rest of the uniform remained unchanged.

In September 2006, Drayton changed its uniform again after consultation with students and parents. The new uniform consisted of a black blazer, with a white shirt, along with the usual black trousers and shoes.

== North Oxfordshire Academy ==
See North Oxfordshire Academy

Drayton School closed in 2007. North Oxfordshire Academy opened on the site.

== See also ==
- History of Banbury, Oxfordshire
