= Cope baronets =

Set index for Cope baronets

There have been four baronetcies created for persons with the surname Cope. They are all now extinct.

- Cope baronets of Hanwell (1611)
- Cope baronets of Bruern (1714)
- Cope baronets of Osbaston (1918)
- Cope baronets of St Mellons (1928): see William Cope, 1st Baron Cope
