= William Cope (cofferer) =

English courtier

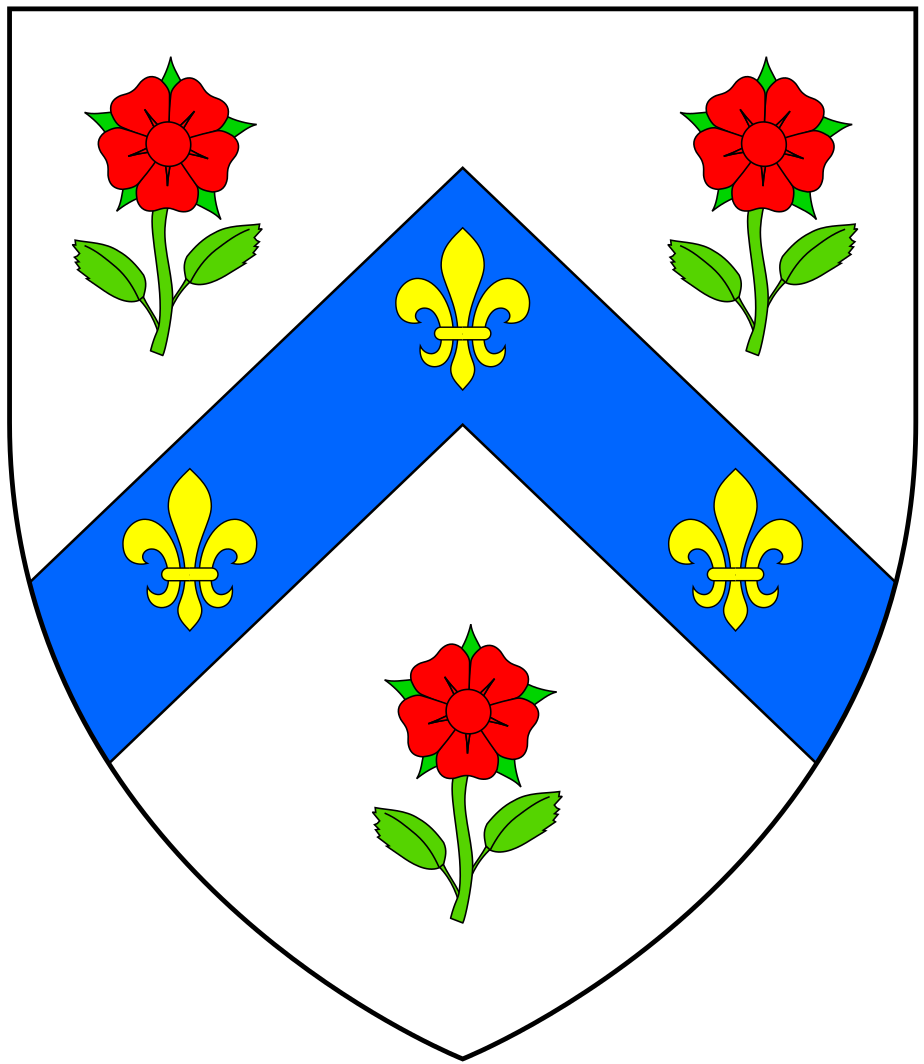
Arms of Cope of Hanwell: Argent, on a chevron azure between 3 roses gules slipped proper 3 fleurs-de-lys or

Sir William Cope PC (c.1450 Grimsbury, Northampshire - 7 April 1513 Hanwell, Oxfordshire) was an English courtier who was Cofferer of the Household to King Henry VII.

== Career ==
He was born into the well-to-do Cope family of Oxfordshire. In addition to the lands he inherited from his family he also acquired more estates, particularly that of Hanwell Castle around 1500, which became the family seat for many generations.

He served as Cofferer of the Household of Henry VII from 1494 to 1505. Cope was a member of the Privy Council. In the absence at that time of a Treasurer of the Household he carried out the duties of that office as well.

In 1498 he was granted the Lordships of Wormleighton and Fenny Compton, part of the lands of Simon de Montford who had been attainted in 1495. He later sold the lands to Sir John Spencer, who was also the cousin of Cope's wife Jane Spencer, later of Althorp.

He was made Keeper of Portchester Castle in 1509. He had married twice.

He died in 1513 and was laid to rest in St Peter's church in Hanwell.
