= William Watts (East India Company official) =

British East India Company official (c. 1722–1764)

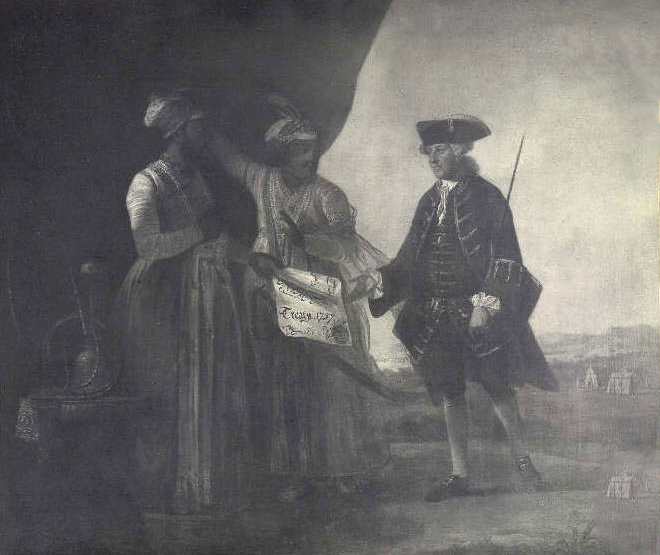
Mir Jafar and his son Miran delivering the Treaty of 1757 to William Watts

William Watts (c. 1722 – 4 August 1764) was a British official with the East India Company. He was involved in the overthrow of the last independent ruler of Bengal, leading directly to the consolidation of Company rule in Bengal and his own personal enrichment. Through his wife Begum Johnson, he had notable descendants, including a Prime Minister of the United Kingdom.

== Early life and marriage ==
Watts was born about 1722, a son of William Watts of London, an academy master (teacher), and his first wife Mary Hills.

On 24 March 1749 in Calcutta, William married Frances Altham, née Croke (10 April [1725] 1728 – 3 February 1812), a well-connected widow. She is known to history as Begum Johnson and lived most of her remarkably long life in Calcutta, which in 1772 became the de facto capital of British India. This connected William Watts to the Governors of Fort St. David and of Calcutta.

== Career ==
Watts was chief of the Cossimbazar factory (trading post) of the East India Company. Robert Clive made Watts the company's representative to the Nawab's court at Murshidabad. Clive engaged Watts to work out a secret plan for the final overthrow of Siraj ud-Daulah and to install a favourable ruler instead. Watts thus set up contact with the dissident emirs (nobles, commanders) of the Murshidabad durbar (court), including Mir Jafar, Rai Durlabh and Yar Lutuf Khan. Watts played a role in forging the grand conspiracy against Siraj Ud Daulah which led to the Battle of Plassey. On 5 June 1757, he visited Mir Jafar and obtained his oath of allegiance.

In recognition of his services, Watts was given £114,000 from the Nawab's treasury and made the governor of Fort William on 22 June 1758, in place of Roger Drake, who had deserted the fort when it was attacked and captured earlier that month. This had been the location of the Black Hole of Calcutta on 20 June 1756. Four days later Watts resigned in favour of Robert Clive to return to England.

== Later life and death ==
On his return to England he built the South Hill Park mansion, which lies to the south of Bracknell, Berkshire; the building is now an arts centre.

In 1759 he was offered government backing to fight Ipswich but he refused what was likely to be a competitive election saying that he was "quite unfit for a bustle" but ready to pay for a seat "where no kind of opposition can be.

In June 1764, he was in the process of buying Hanslope Park, in Buckinghamshire, but died that August. The sale was completed for his son Edward, who became Lord of the manor.

Watts died in August 1764 and is buried in the Watts vault in Hanslope parish church. His Memoirs of the Revolution in Bengal was published in the year of his death.

== Family ==
He had three surviving children (one child, William, died in infancy). These were also the only surviving children of Frances. All had notable descendants in politics and empire-building.

Their daughter Amelia married George III's close adviser Charles Jenkinson, later the first Earl of Liverpool. An early portrait by Joshua Reynolds is thought to have been of her. She died aged 19, shortly after giving birth to Robert, who grew up to be Prime Minister of the United Kingdom.

Their daughter Sophia married George Poyntz Ricketts of Midgham, Jamaica (named after Midgham, Berkshire, the family seat of the Poyntz) and Grove Place in Nursling, Hampshire. He became governor of Tobago in 1793 and of Barbados the following year, a post he held till his death in 1800. Their son Charles Milner Ricketts (1776–1867) (presumed to be named after Sir William Milner, 2nd Baronet) spent most of his working life in India as a respected administrator, married a sister of Michael Prendergast (MP), and on his retirement became an MP himself.

Their son Edward stayed in Hanslope Park. On 26 March 1778 he married Florentia, daughter of Alexander Wynch, sometime Governor of Madras, who had retired to Harley Street, London.
