= Amelia Watts =

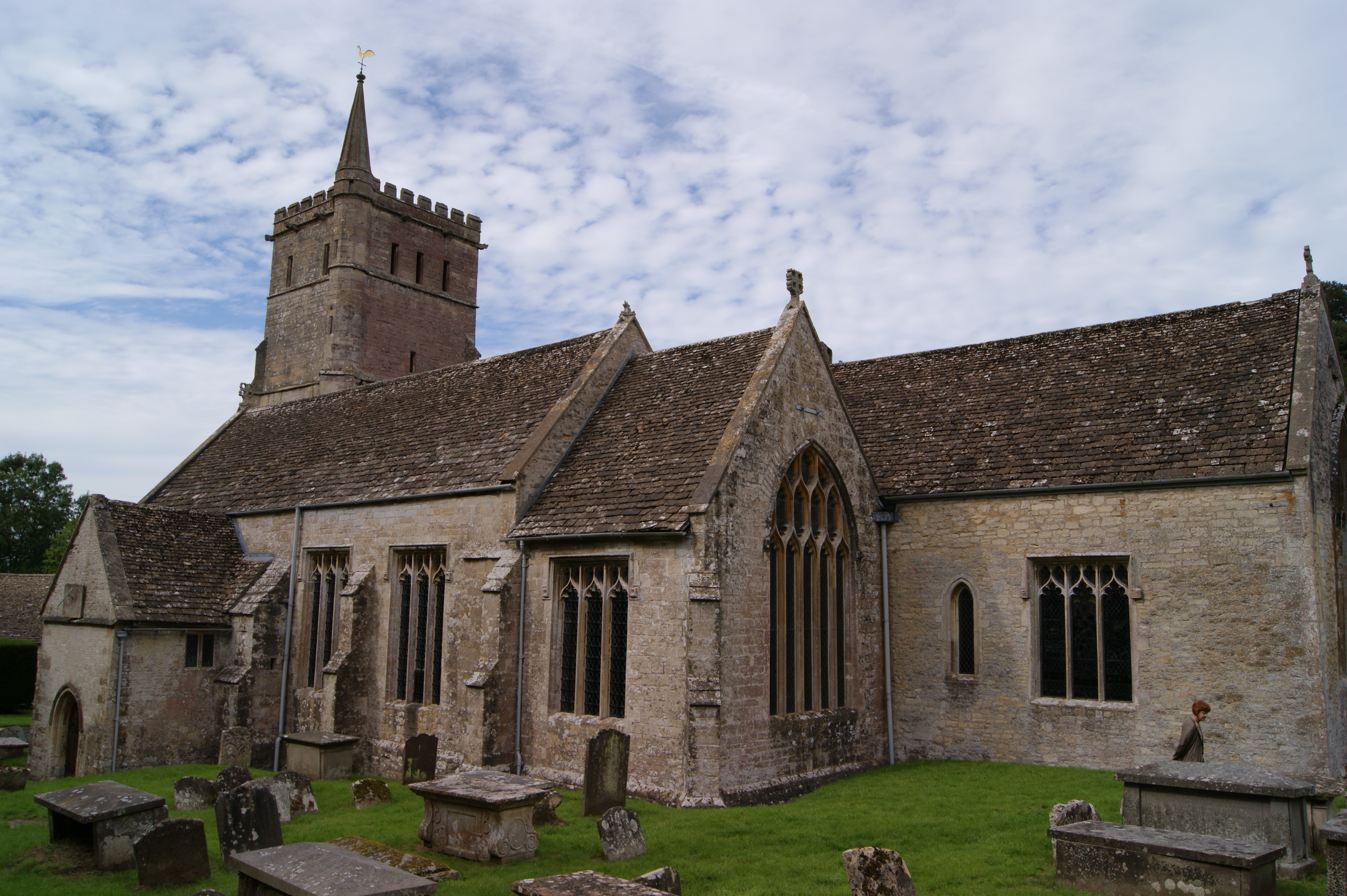
- Church of St Mary, Hawkesbury (burial place)
- Born: December 1750; Calcutta, India
- Died: 12 July 1770 (aged 19); England
- Burial place: Church of St Mary, Hawkesbury, Gloucestershire
- Spouse: Charles Jenkinson (m. 1769)
- Children: Robert Jenkinson
- Parents: William Watts (father); Begum Johnson (mother)

Amelia Jenkinson, Lady Jenkinson (née Watts; December 1750 – 12 July 1770) was an Anglo-Indian woman. She was the first wife of Charles Jenkinson, 1st Earl of Liverpool. She died soon after giving birth to Robert Jenkinson, who grew up to become British prime minister. An early portrait by the painter Joshua Reynolds is thought to have been of her.

== Biography ==
Amelia Watts was born in December 1750, in Calcutta, India, to William Watts and his wife Begum Johnson. She was of mixed Portuguese and Indian descent through her maternal grandmother.

On 9 February 1769 she married Sir Charles Jenkinson. She gave birth to a son, named Robert, on 7 June 1770. She died on 12 July 1770 due to complications from childbirth. She is buried at the Church of St Mary, Hawkesbury.
