= South Hill Park =

Arts centre, theatre and cinema in a former mansion in Bracknell, England

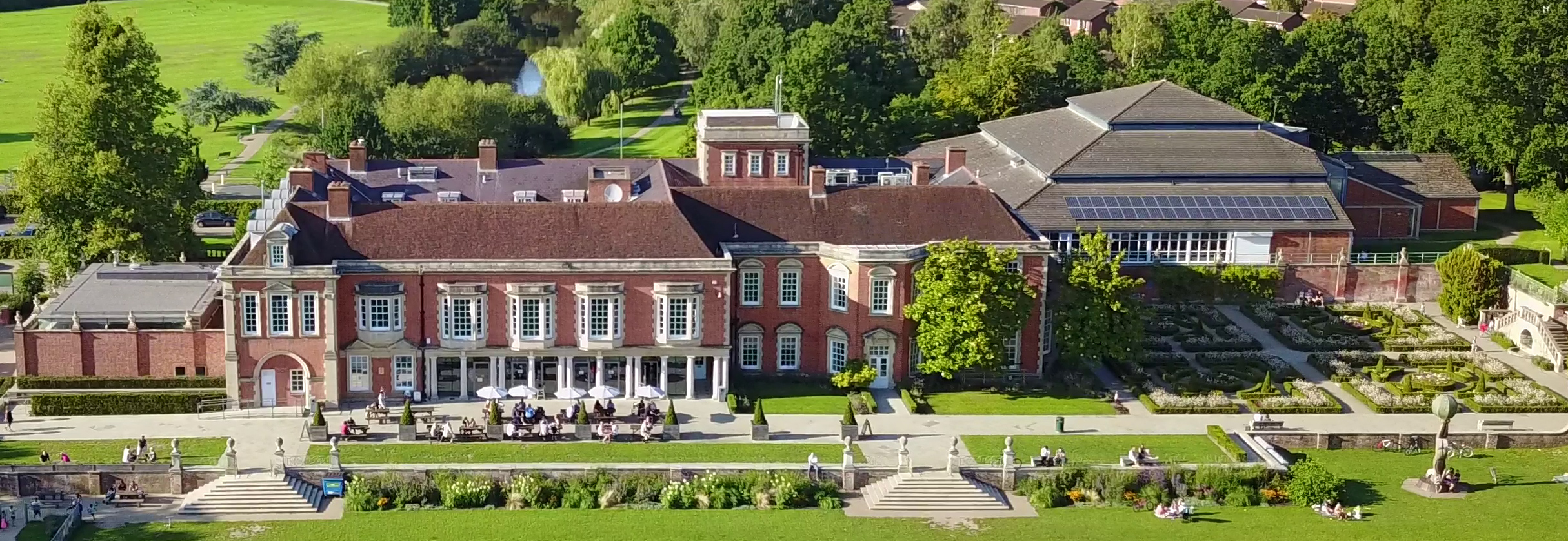
- South Hill Park mansion & Wilde Theatre

- Location within Berkshire Location within the United Kingdom
- Established: 1973
- Location: Ringmead, Bracknell, Berkshire RG12, England, United Kingdom
- Coordinates: 51.3936799°N 0.7498582°W
- Visitors: 250,000

South Hill Park is a 24-acre (9.7 ha) English country house and its grounds, now run as an arts centre. It lies in the Birch Hill estate to the south of Bracknell town centre, in Berkshire.

== History ==
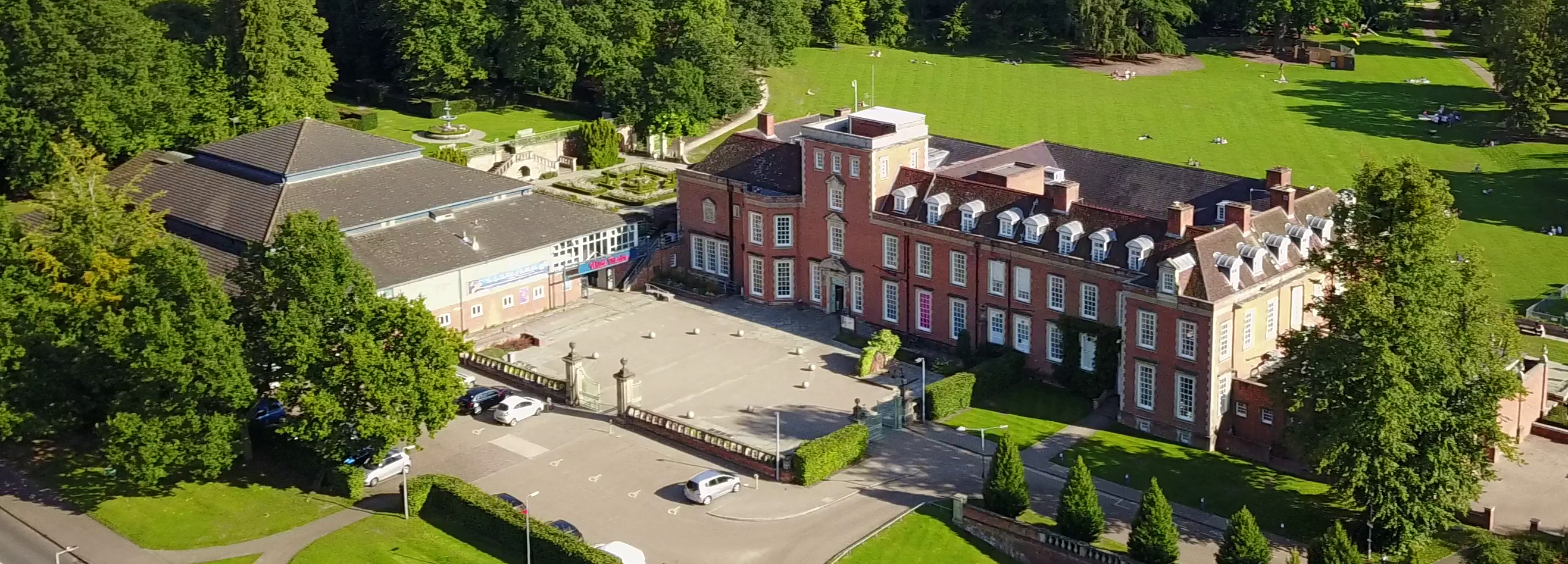
View of the front of the mansion house, Wilde Theatre to the left, and grounds to the rear

=== Construction by Watts ===
The original South Hill Park mansion was built in 1760 for William Watts and his wife (better known as Begum Johnson) for his retirement from service as a senior official of the Bengal Government. The house was originally on two floors, built in the Italian manner, decorated with stucco, with a front entrance and tower in the baroque style. The grounds included 30 acres (12 ha) of common land, which William Watts enclosed. In return, he built almshouses on a site opposite Easthampstead Parish Church about half a mile away. The almshouses were eventually demolished by order of the Marquess of Downshire in 1826.

=== Other private owners ===
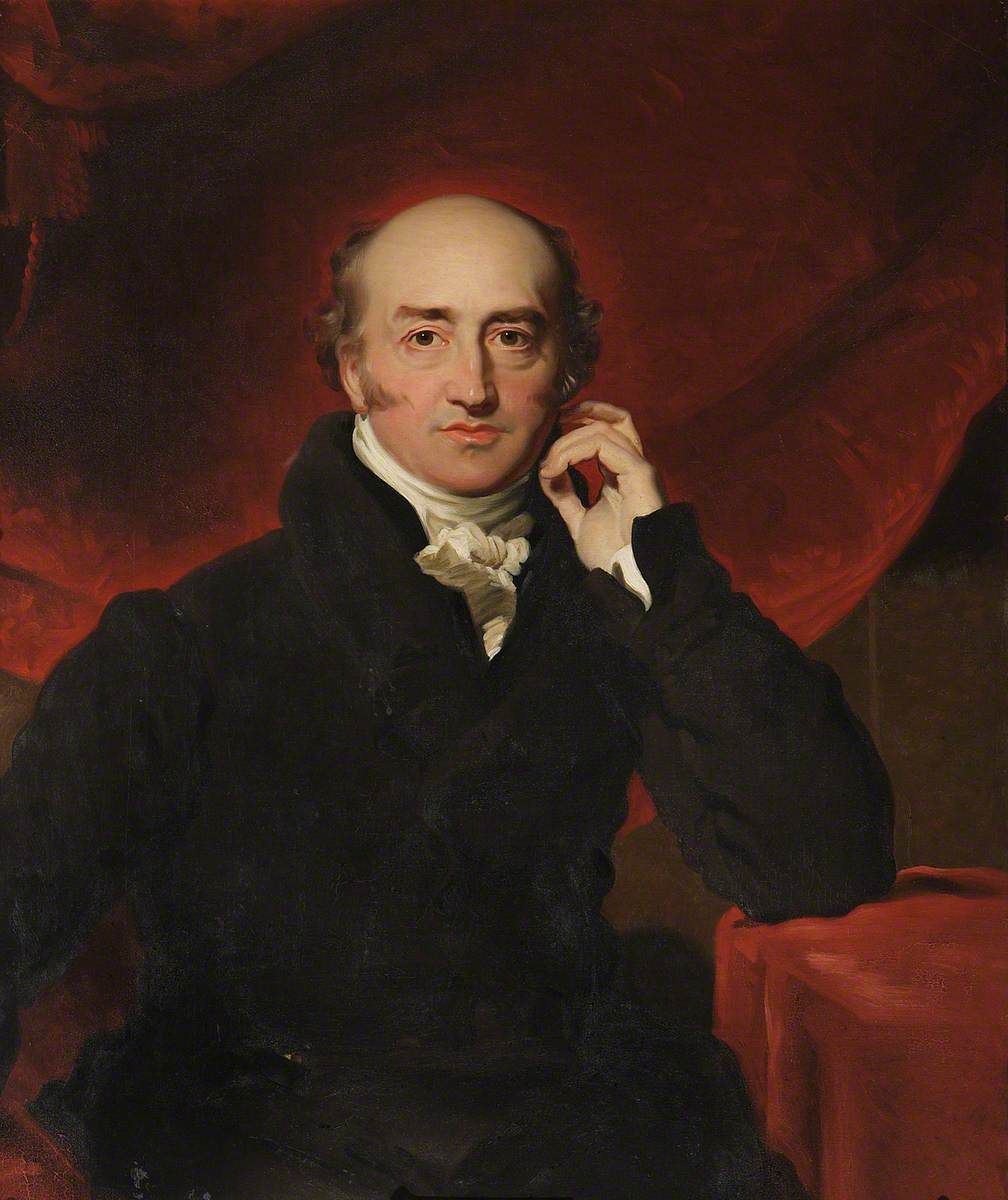
George Canning, Prime Minister and one-time owner of the estate

After the death of Watts, the Honourable Henry Bouverie lived in the house until 1787. He was followed by Sir Stephen Lushington until 1807, when George Canning, the celebrated statesman, acquired the property. Canning served under Foreign Secretary William Pitt, and both Prime Minister and Chancellor of the Exchequer at the time of his death in 1827. Sir John Soane modified the house during this time.

The Earls of Limerick were the next owners, around the time of the Easthampstead enclosure award of 1827. Kelly's Post Office Directory shows that Sir James Matheson, who made his fortune trading in China as Jardine, Matheson, was in residence in 1847. In 1853 he sold the estate to Sir William Goodenough Hayter, the Judge Advocate General. In 1868, South Hill Park was referred to in Cassey's Directory as "one of the principal mansions in the neighbourhood of Easthampstead". Hayter lived there until his death in 1878, when he drowned in one of the ponds.

Kelly's Directory of 1883 contains a description of South Hill Park, referring to it as the seat of Lady Hayter, "a compact residence of brick faced with cement, standing in a park of 800 acres (320 ha) in which there are four lakes; the private gardens are very beautiful, being laid out in terraces". Sir William Hayter's son, Sir Arthur Divett Hayter, later Baron Haversham, rebuilt most of the mansion towards the end of the 19th century, in brick and Bath stone, incorporating one wing of the original house. Architect Temple Moore (1856–1920) was commissioned to remodel the house in 1891 and the hard landscaping near the house in 1893. Moore was primarily seen as a church architect and in his previous church commissions were mostly designed in the prevailing Gothic Revival style but he also included Baroque details. The Haversham coat of arms can be seen over the main entrance of the building and is described as "azure and escallop between three bulls' heads couped or". The crest surmounting the coat of arms also shows a bull's head and gold shells. The staff at the time consisted of three footmen, three housemaids, one lady's maid, one housekeeper, one butler, one valet, labourers, gamekeepers, scullery maids and kitchen maids.

Lord Haversham died on 10 May 1917. Lady Haversham was still in residence in 1920, when she erected a marble tablet in Easthampstead Parish Church as a memorial to 62 men who lost their lives in the 1914–18 war. After the death of Lady Haversham in 1929, leaving no direct heir, the house passed into the hands of Major Rickman O.B.E., Lady Haversham's nephew, who was the last person to own and live in it as one house and is best known for shooting himself in the Gun Room in 1940.

Due to a fire towards the end of the 19th century, the house is sometimes said to be haunted, especially the modern Studio Theatre area which is located on the site of the nursery. The supposed hauntings are by two children who died when the nursery caught alight.

=== Further owners ===
During the Second World War (1939–45) the house was occupied by the Royal Sea Bathing Hospital, evacuated from Margate. In the late 1940s it was converted into five luxury flats with the main reception being common to all.

From 1953, the house was owned by the BBC, who converted parts into studios and acoustically treated some of the rooms.

In 1963, South Hill Park was included in an extension of the new town designated area of Bracknell and the Bracknell Development Corporation acquired the property. The house was let in 1965 to Ferranti Limited, who used it as offices and laboratories until early 1972.

=== Arts Centre ===
In 1972, a proposal to convert the house into an Arts Centre with an additional theatre was agreed, with the intention that the immediate surrounding gardens, lawns, trees and two lakes would be preserved. The South Hill Park Trust was established and the South Hill Park Arts Centre opened in October 1973. In the grounds of South Hill Park a plaque records the planting of a tree by William Ewart Gladstone in 1893. By 1980 Alistair Snow developed the visual and live art programme at South Hill Park Arts Centre in Bracknell. One of the first Artists in Residence was Elaine Shemilt, from 1980 to 1982.

== Wilde Theatre and later phases ==
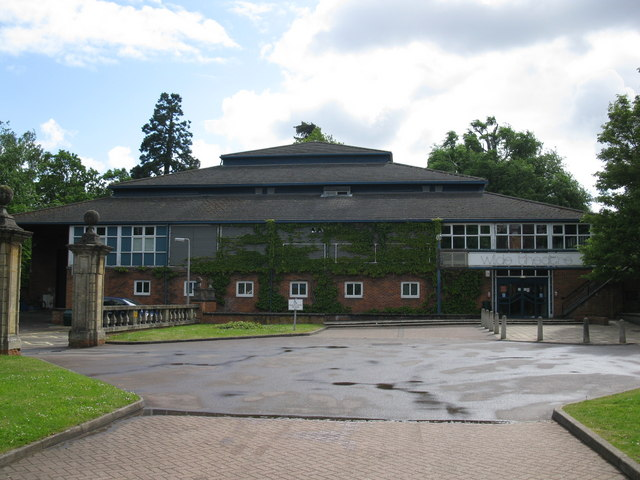
Wilde Theatre

Before being completed in 1984, the 330 seat Wilde Theatre was first proposed after South Hill Park became an arts centre, and has since drawn many people to the area. The theatre was designed by architect Axel Burrough of the architectural practice Levitt Bernstein and Iain Mackintosh of Theatre Projects on the principal of a courtyard theatre as used in Shakespeare’s time. The Wilde Theatre was officially opened by The Princess Anne on 15 May 1984 which due to the local association with Oscar Wilde was named after him and the first performance being The Importance of Being Earnest.

A new Dance Studio and Bar extension, along with additional dressing rooms, rehearsal and storage space, were added to the theatre in 1988 and 1989.

The Bracknell Gallery opened in 1991 as a result of these developments, and now presents a regular programme of contemporary visual art, crafts and live art. The art centre also organises exhibitions in the Mansion Space Galleries.

== South Hill Park Arts Centre today ==
Italian Gardens in 2009

Festival Art

Theatre Performance

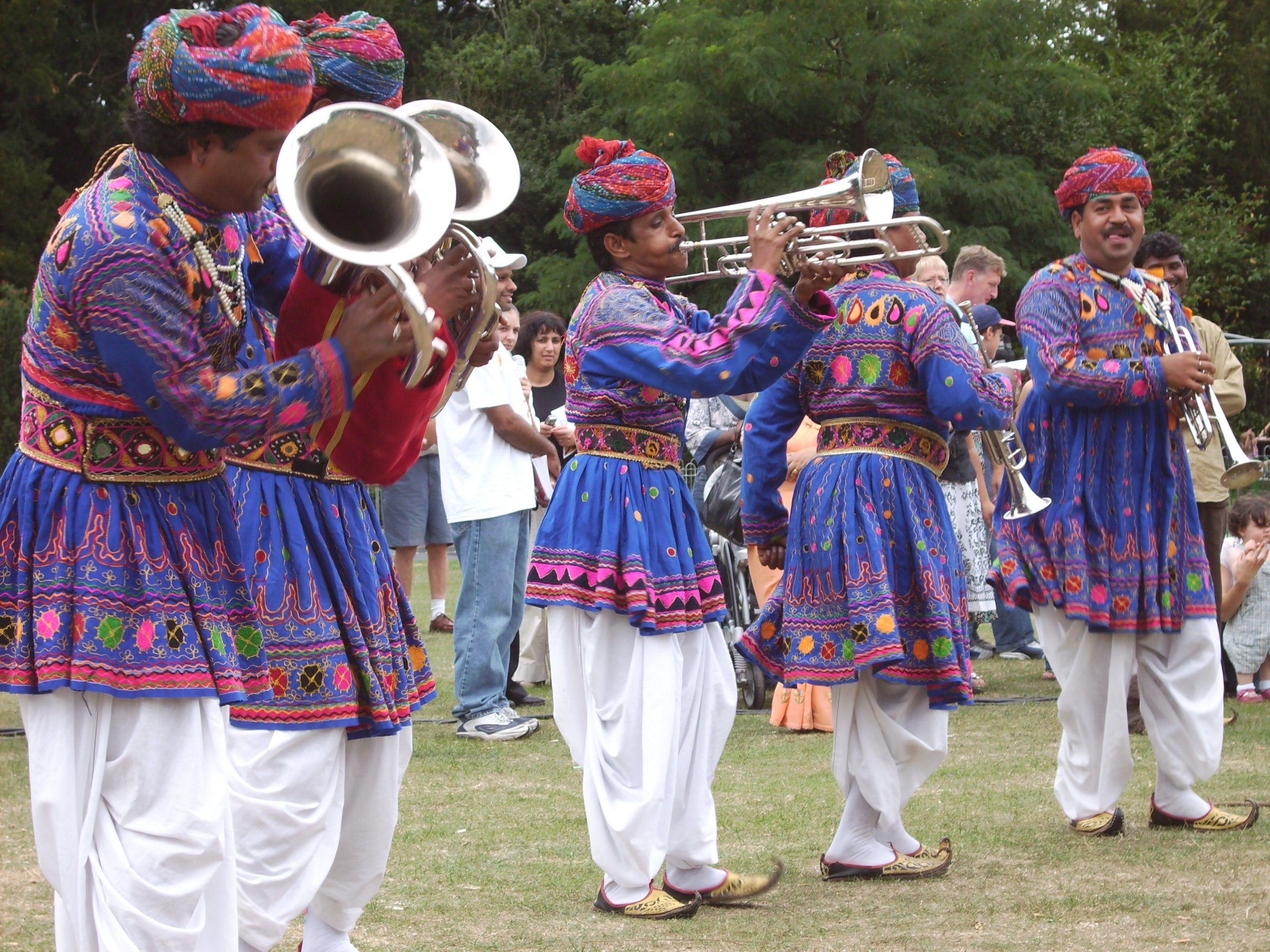
Brass Band

In 2002 South Hill Park underwent its most recent transformation, successfully applying to the Arts Council of England National Lottery Board and gaining £3 million combined with £1 million from Bracknell Forest Borough Council. These funds allowed the Mansion spaces to re-develop and focus on artistic activity. New studios were created for ceramics, printmaking, silversmithing and fine arts to complement the existing theatres, gallery, dance studio, cinema, recital room and cellar stage. The Atrium bar was opened, allowing food and drink to be served alongside the art and music performances. Martin Donlin created several artworks to the celebrate the new building.

In 2004, the Digital Media Centre opened, thanks to the support of local businessman, John Nike. In 2011, Bracknell Forest Borough Council undertook a £4.4 million restoration of South Hill Park's historic grounds with funding from a National Lottery grant award.

== See also ==
- List of miscellaneous works by Temple Moore
