= Begum Johnson =

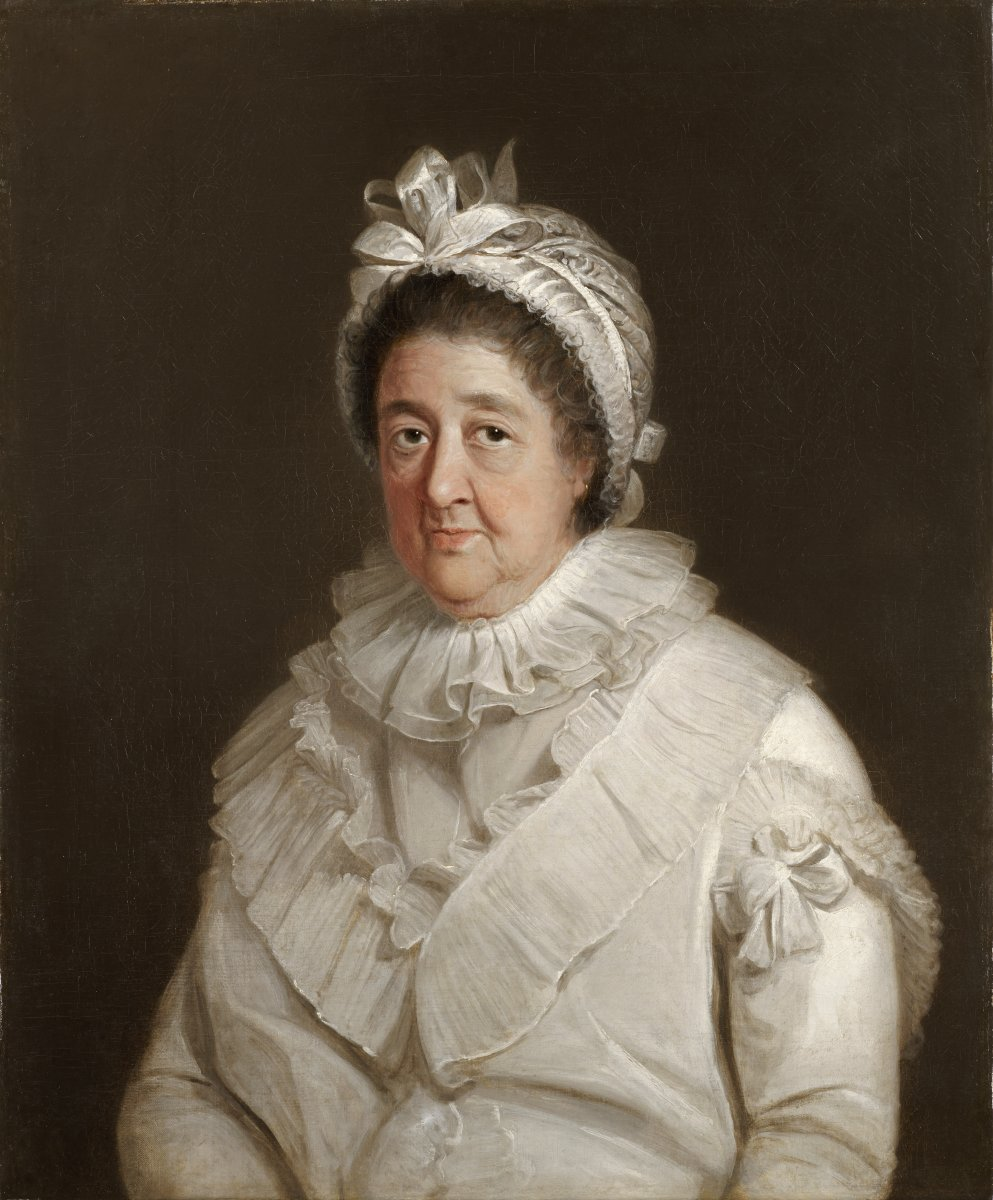
Begum Johnson

Frances Johnson (née Croke; 10 April 1725/28 – 3 February 1812), known as Begum Johnson, was, according to her memorial, "The oldest British resident in Bengal, universally beloved, respected and revered". She lived most of her life in Calcutta, and was witness to an era which spanned the inception of British rule over Bengal in 1757 to its consolidation by the early 1800s.

She died in Calcutta in 1812. That same year, her grandson, Robert Jenkinson, 2nd Earl of Liverpool, became Prime Minister of the United Kingdom and served in that high office for fifteen years (1812–27).

== Background and early life ==
She was born Frances Croke, the second daughter of Edward Croke or Crook (1690 – 12 Feb 1769), Governor of Fort St. David, in the town of Cuddalore, 100 miles south of Madras (now Chennai). Her mother was Isabella Beizor (c.1710–80), a Portuguese Indian, one of a long-established community.

Her sister Sophia married Alexander Wynch, grandfather of Florentia Sale, author of A Journal of the Disasters in Afghanistan, 1841–42.

Frances spent the first few years of her life in south India (the Madras Presidency) and much of her later life in Eastern India (the Bengal Presidency).

== First three marriages ==
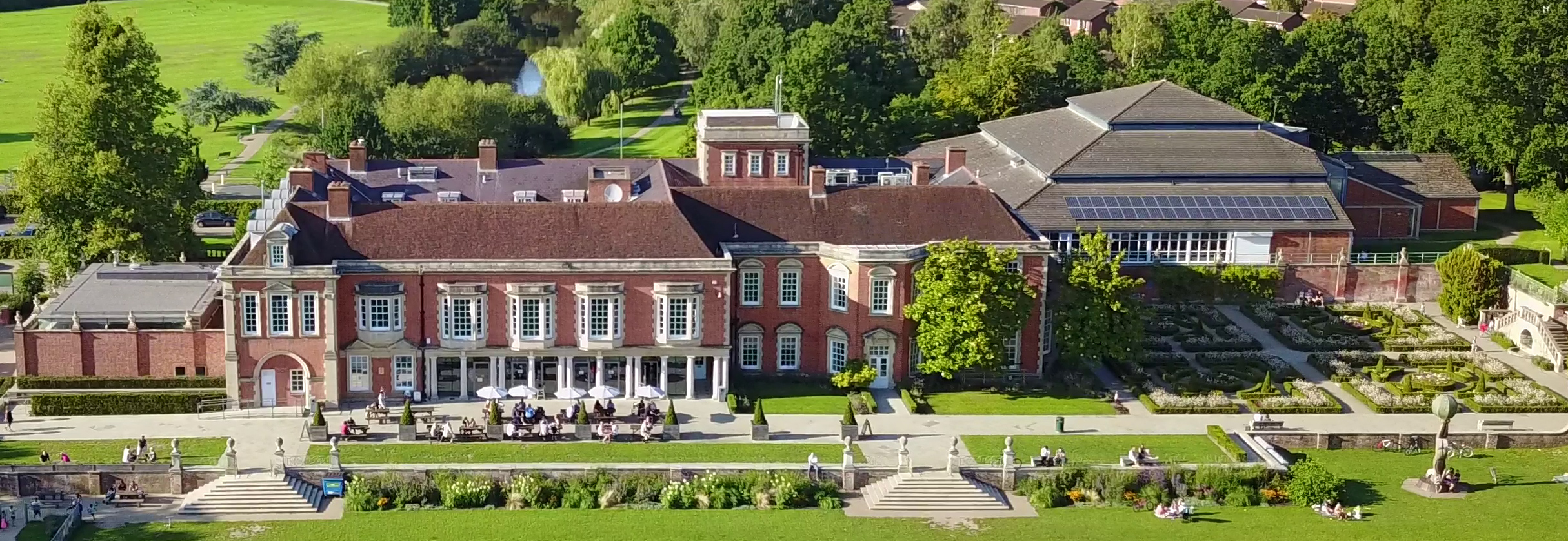
South Hill Park

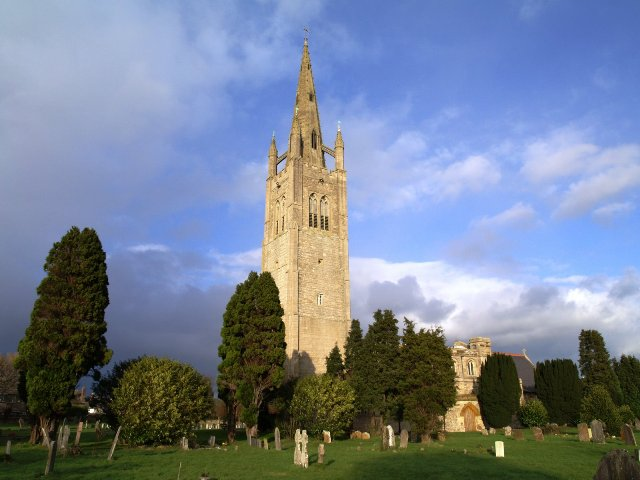
Hanslope Church

As a very young woman (allegedly aged thirteen, though this is contested), Frances married for the first time. Her husband was Parry Purpler Templer, nephew of the then Governor of Calcutta, Thomas Broddyll (also spelled Bradyll). She bore two children in quick succession, but her husband and both of their children died within a couple of years of the wedding.

Frances married secondly James Altham, but he died less than a fortnight after the wedding.

Two years after the death of her second husband, Frances married again, and she was no more than 24 years old. On 24 March 1749, in Calcutta, she married thirdly William Watts (c. 1722 – 4 August 1764), who was by this point a senior member of the council in Bengal and a senior official in the British East India Company. The first two or three years of their marriage were peaceful, but the early 1750s was a period of political strife in Bengal, and the couple were caught up in the turmoil surrounding the succession of Siraj ud-Daulah on the death of his grandfather Alivardi Khan. Frances was separated from her husband, and held in captivity along with her children. The widow of Alivardi Khan treated them well, and took them to protection in the French town of Chandannagar.

The turmoil ended with the Battle of Plassey in 1757. In 1758, Frances's husband was given a fortune in recognition of his services, and was briefly appointed governor of Fort William, but he chose to retire "home", as the phrase was. The family moved to England, the first time that Frances had ever set foot in that country. They bought a country estate near Bracknell, Berkshire and built a typical English country house; South Hill Park is now an arts centre. They were in the process of buying Hanslope Park, Hanslope, Buckinghamshire, when her husband died in August 1764. The sale was completed for their son Edward, who became Lord of the manor.

== Return to India and fourth marriage ==
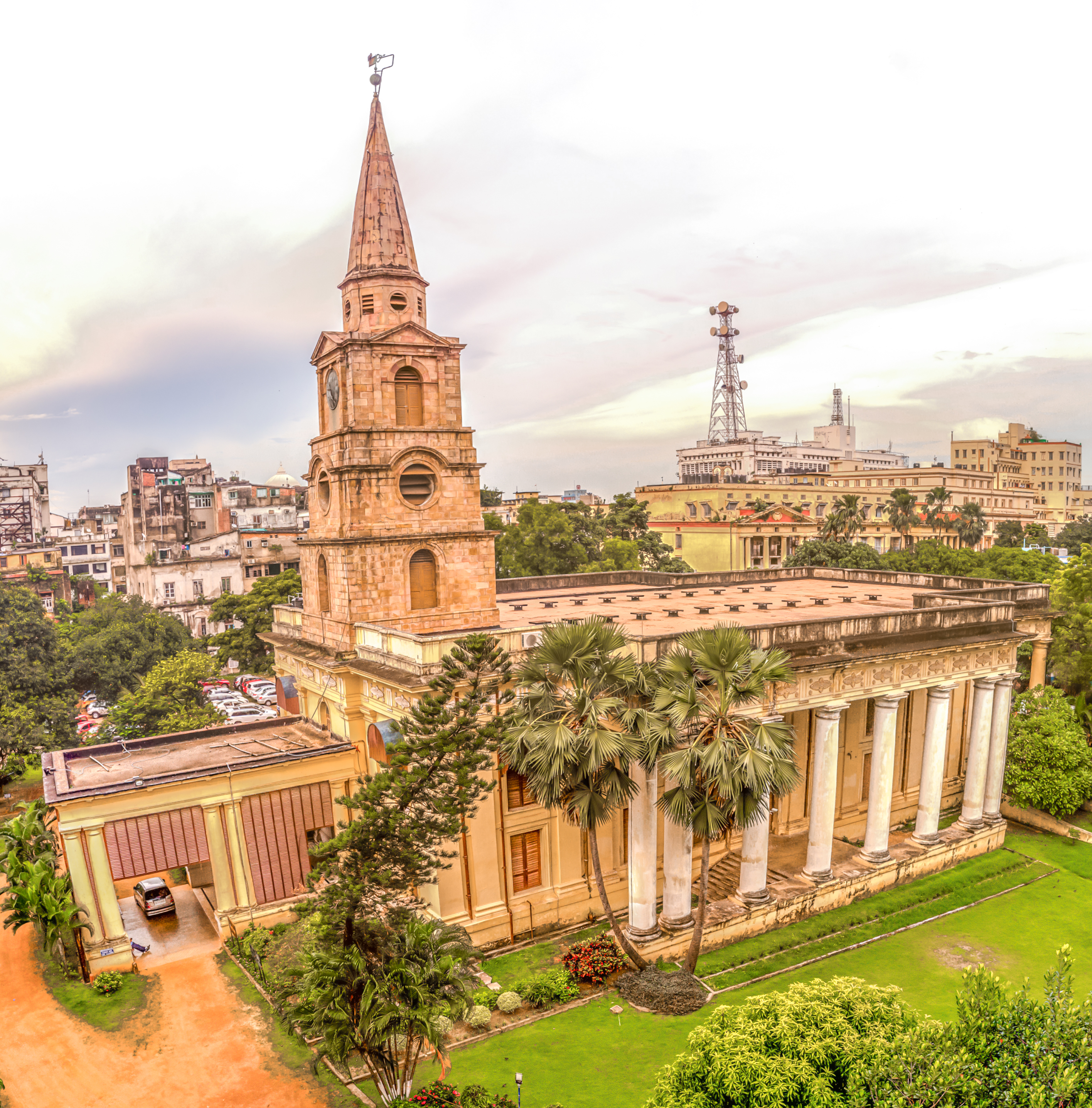
St. John's Church, Kolkata

After Watts died in 1764, Frances spent the next five years as a widow in England. Once her children were grown up and settled there, she returned to India around 1769, some ten years after having left. This decision was a truly extraordinary one. The voyage to India, via the Cape of Good Hope, took several months, and there was little prospect that she would ever see any of her children again. Moreover, she was a widow in her mid-40s, and she had essentially nothing to do in India; no family to care for and certainly no job or office to hold. During those years, it was normal for British men to go to India while they were still teenagers, to make a fortune there, take Indian wives and adopt the Indian way of life, but it was highly unusual for Englishwomen of any age to be in India at all. The "Memsahib" became a cultural figure only after the opening of the Suez Canal in 1869, a century after the Begum's decision.

It is unclear why Frances separated herself from her children and returned to India, unless she had found herself a misfit in British society and had been unable to adjust to a new environment during the ten years she spent there. Perhaps she yearned for the familiar places, climate, scenes and way of life to which she had been accustomed for the first thirty-three years of her life. Perhaps she had some relatives of Indian blood, and wanted to be with them; perhaps her relationship with her children was not entirely cordial. Whatever the reason, she set sail for India in 1769 and settled in Calcutta, the scene of what had been the best years of her life, when her husband had held high office there and made a fortune besides. She was a wealthy woman, and her fortune had even greater purchase in India than in England, so she was able to live in some state, in a large mansion with many servants.

In 1772, an Oxford graduate arrived in Calcutta, one Reverend William Johnson, who was officially an assistant chaplain to the military forces of Fort William, but in practice supported the whole British population of the city. The wealthy widow and the forceful clergyman married in 1774; this final marriage gave her the name by which she was best known, Begum Johnson. Begum is an honorific for married women in India, used by Muslim ladies and applied, in those early days, to other non-Hindu women, designating them as respectable matrons. The widow of Alivardi Khan, who supervised the captivity of Frances Johnson, would have been known by this title.

Johnson "was a man of immense energy, great assurance, and not easily discouraged by opposition." Upon landing in India, he quickly mounted a campaign to build the city's first Anglican cathedral, now St. Johns Church. It took the chaplain many years to raise the necessary money, but the foundation stone was finally laid in 1784, and the church was consecrated in 1787.

== Separation and later life ==
It may have been expected that, having persevered with his noble project for so many years, and having brought it to fruition, Johnson would now spend his remaining years in the near vicinity of the edifice, rejoicing in his work and lavishing attention on its further embellishment. That was not the case. His project completed, the reverend, who had been in India for sixteen years already, wanted to make a long visit to England, receive the honours, encomiums and ecclesiastical preferments attendant upon the completion of his noble work, perhaps spend his remaining years in his native land. However, his wife was not inclined to leave her native land for a second time, and nor was she averse to the idea of living apart from her husband. The marriage had apparently been less than idyllic, for cultural reasons: Johnson had found his wife a little too well-adjusted into Indian ways, and she likewise had found his evangelical bent and supercilious attitude towards India irksome. Frances lacked her husband's enthusiasm for evangelism, and had not exactly emptied her coffers to fulfil his dream; she now chose to spend her money in quite another way. She offered William Johnson a settlement and an annuity if he would go away to England without her, and avoid coming back. They agreed that they would be better off without each other, and simply parted ways, divorce (especially for a clergyman) being quite impossible in those days. Eyre Chatterton, the inaugural Bishop of Nagpur, wrote of the Johnsons in his 1924 A History of the Church of England in India:

In 1788 the Rev. William Johnson resigned his Chaplaincy after sixteen years in Calcutta, and returned to England. He had married in 1774, Mrs. Frances Watts, a lady who had previously buried three husbands. Her third husband had been a distinguished official. Possessed of considerable wealth, in addition to peculiar charm and ability which made her a great favourite in Calcutta, she had evidently not found Johnson indispensable to her life's happiness, so that when he left India on retirement, she decided to remain there..... In her will, she mentioned her husband by name, but left nothing to him.

Begum Johnson was 59 years old and never married again. Kathleen Blechynden wrote in Calcutta: Past and Present (1905):

It is not difficult to picture the old lady, in her hale old age, reclining among great cushions, waited on by attentive slave girls, enjoying the fragrant hookah, and telling over the oft-told tale of her experiences and adventures when under the protection of her friend the begum, whose title, so often on her lips, was turned by her friends in kindly jest into a soubriquet for herself. That the old lady was very particular about the observance of forms and ceremonies is shown by her having obtained from the Marquess of Wellesley the grant of a plot of ground, and permission that she might be buried in St. John's Churchyard, which had long been closed for interments, and also the promise that she should have a public funeral. When, in 1812, the time came for the fulfilment of these undertakings, Lord Wellesley had long vacated the Governor-Generalship, but his successor redeemed his pledge, and Begum Johnson was followed to her last resting-place by all the members of Calcutta society, headed by the Governor-General in his state coach, drawn by six horses, attended by the Body-Guard, and followed by the members of Council, and judges in their coaches.

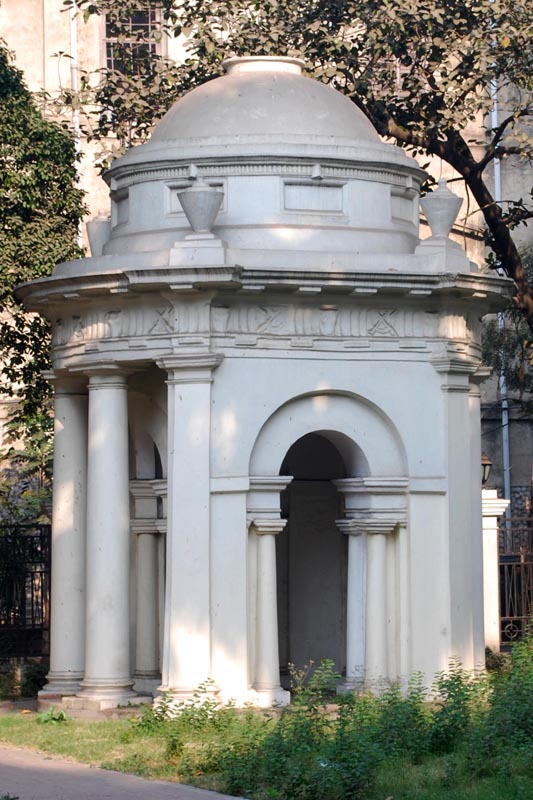
Frances Johnson's grave at St. John's Church

(The reference is to Richard Wellesley, 1st Marquess Wellesley, who was Governor-General of Bengal from 1798-1805.) She died in Calcutta on 3 February 1812. Her memorial in St. John's Church (no longer the cathedral) states 'The oldest British resident in Bengal, universally beloved, respected and revered'. In 1990 the British Association for Cemeteries in South Asia published a book entitled The Calcutta of Begum Johnson, taking her name to sum up an age.

== Descendants ==
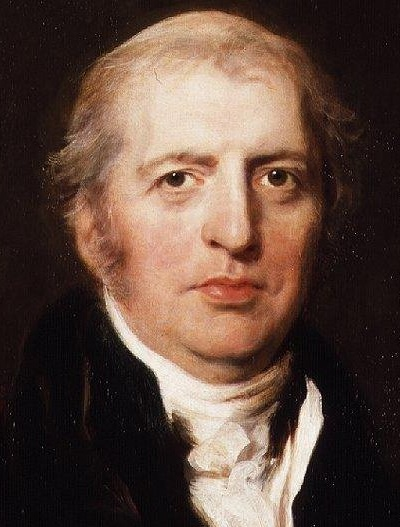
Robert Jenkinson, 2nd Earl of Liverpool, her grandson

Frances married four times, and had children by at least two of those marriages, but only three of her children, all borne to William Watts, survived to adulthood. All three of them left descendants notable in politics and empire-building:

- The couple's daughter Amelia married George III's close adviser Charles Jenkinson, later the first Earl of Liverpool. An early portrait by Joshua Reynolds is thought to have been of her. She died aged 19 in 1770, shortly after giving birth to Robert, who grew up to be Prime Minister of the United Kingdom.
- The couple's daughter Sophia married George Poyntz Ricketts of Midgham, Jamaica (named after Midgham, Berkshire, the family seat of the Poyntz) and Grove Place in Nursling, Hampshire. He became governor of Tobago in 1793 and of Barbados the following year, a post he held till his death in 1800. Their son Charles Milner Ricketts (1776–1867) (presumed to be named after Sir William Milner, 2nd Baronet) spent most of his working life in India as a respected administrator, married a sister of Michael Prendergast (MP), and on his retirement became an MP himself.
- The couple's only son, Edward Watts, lived in Hanslope Park, purchased by the family in 1764, just around the time that William Watts died. On 26 March 1778, he married Florentia, daughter of Florentia Cradock and Alexander Wynch, sometime Governor of Madras, who had retired to Harley Street, London. The families were connected to each other as Alexander Wynch's first wife had been Sophia Croke, the sister of Begum Johnson and thus Edward's aunt.
