= Josias Du Pré =

English merchant and civil servant

Governor of Madras
- In office 31 January 1770 – 2 February 1773
- Preceded by: Sir Robert Palk, 1st Baronet
- Succeeded by: Alexander Wynch

Personal details
- Born: 1721 South Carolina, U.S.
- Died: 1780 (aged 58–59) Beaconsfield, Buckinghamshire, England
- Spouse: Rebecca Alexander

Josias Du Pré (1721–1780) was a London merchant, a director of the East India Company and Governor of Madras.

== Life ==
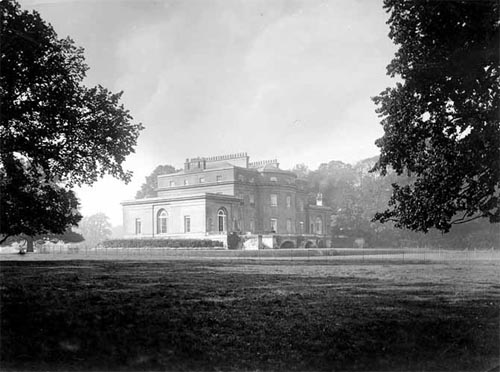
Wilton Park House

Du Pré was born in South Carolina, the son of Cornelius Dupré. He joined the civil service of the East India Company in 1752, as a factor, and rose through a succession of positions. He spent a period in England in the 1760s, and married there. He purchased the Wilton Park Estate near Beaconsfield in Buckinghamshire from the Basil family in 1760, or around 1770.

Du Pré was Governor of Madras from 1770 to 1773. He was mostly preoccupied with the construction of fortifications there. His authority was circumscribed: Eyre Coote, the military commander, and Sir John Lindsay who had overall command in the East Indies, left him little room in which to operate.

Once back in England he commissioned Richard Jupp to build a mansion at Wilton Park. Known as the "White House", it was completed in 1779.

Du Pré at the end of his life became a Fellow of the Royal Society, owing the honour to his appointment two decades earlier of Alexander Dalrymple as his deputy.

He died at Wilton Park in 1780.

== Family ==
He married Rebecca Alexander, daughter of Nathaniel Alexander and sister of James Alexander, 1st Earl of Caledon, another nabob: Du Pré Alexander, 2nd Earl of Caledon, son of the first Earl, was named after Josias.

Of the children of Josias and Rebecca:

- James Du Pré was a Member of Parliament.
- Eliza married Colonel Brice, and then Rev. John Blackwood, son of Sir John Blackwood, 2nd Baronet.
- Rebecca married Sir Philip Grey Egerton, 9th Baronet; Sir Philip Grey Egerton, 10th Baronet, was their son.

Du Pré's sister Esther married Paul Porcher, and was mother of the MP Josias Porcher.

== Notes ==
Political offices
| Preceded by Charles Bourchier | Governor of Madras; 1770–1773 | Succeeded by Alexander Wynch |
