= Church of St Mary, Hawkesbury =

Church in Gloucestershire, England

Parish Church of St Mary the Virgin
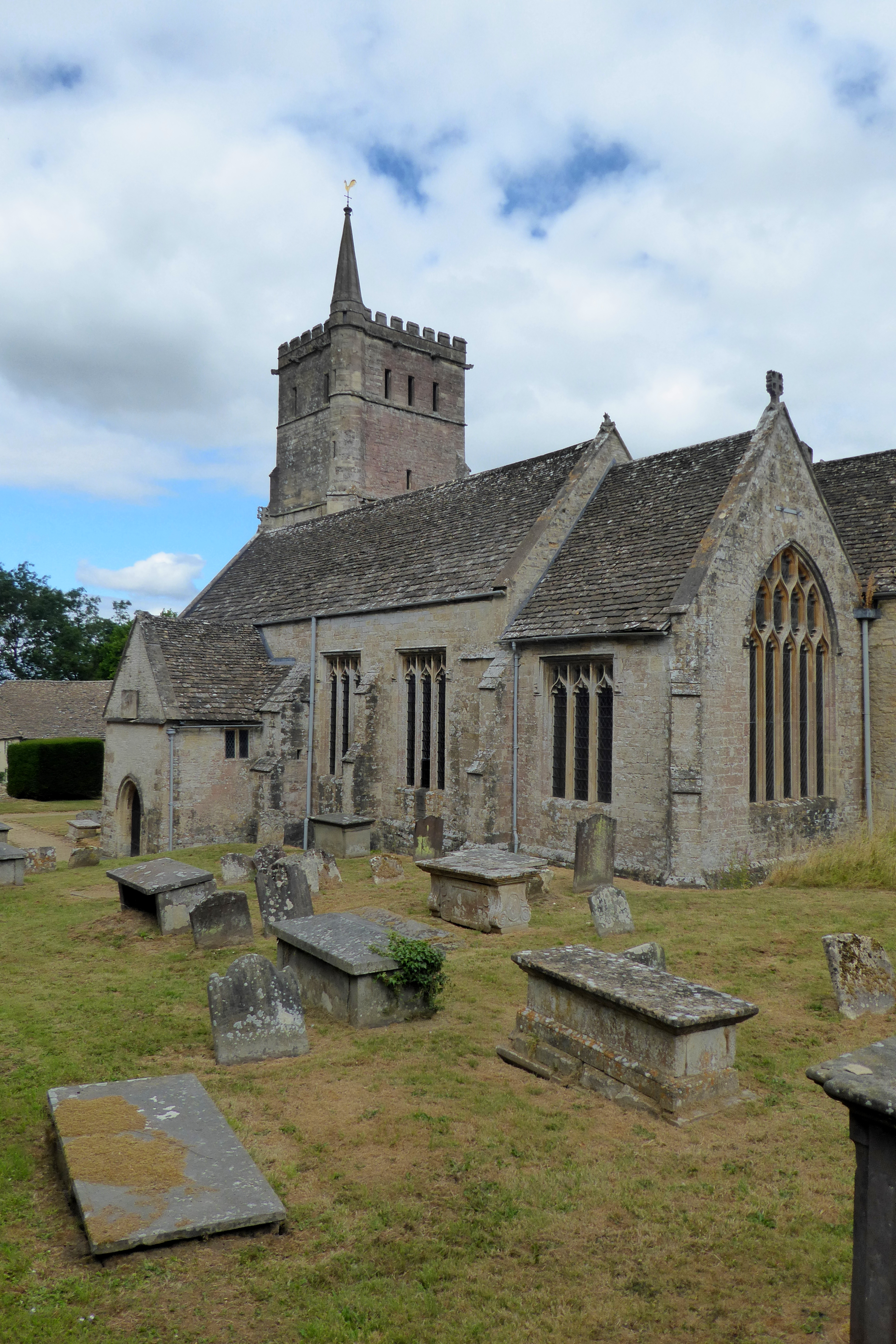

- Location within Gloucestershire
- 51.5807°N 2.3359°W
- Location: Hawkesbury, South Gloucestershire, England

History
- Built: 12th century

Listed Building – Grade I
- Official name: Parish Church of St Mary the Virgin
- Designated: 3 March 1961
- Reference no.: 1320866

The Church of St Mary in Hawkesbury, South Gloucestershire, England, was built in the 12th century. It is a Grade I listed building.

== History ==
The church was built in the 12th century. The site was used for an earlier Saxon church, from which some of the stone was incorporated into the current building. A priest at Hawkesbury in the 11th century was Wulfstan.

Parts of the Early English style building from the 13th century remain but the majority was built in the Perpendicular style of the 14th and 15th centuries. The tower was added in the 15th century.

It underwent a Victorian restoration by W Wood Bethell between 1882 and 1885.

The parish is within the Badminton benefice which is part of the Diocese of Gloucester.

== Architecture ==
The church is built of Cotswold stone. It consists of a four-bay nave with clerestory, chancel, south aisle and chapel and has both north and south porches. The six-stage west tower is supported by diagonal buttresses, and includes a bell dating from the 14th century.

Robert Jenkinson, 2nd Earl of Liverpool, who was the prime minister of the United Kingdom from 1812 to 1827, has a memorial in the chancel, along with many members of the Jenkinson family who were the local lords of the manor.

The churchyard is surrounded by yews. There are 170 marked graves, which include 87 chest tombs. The monument to Thomas Esbury (died 1766) made by Thomas Paty.
