= Robert Jenkinson, 2nd Earl of Liverpool =

Prime Minister of the United Kingdom from 1812 to 1827

The Right Honourable The Earl of Liverpool KG PC FRS
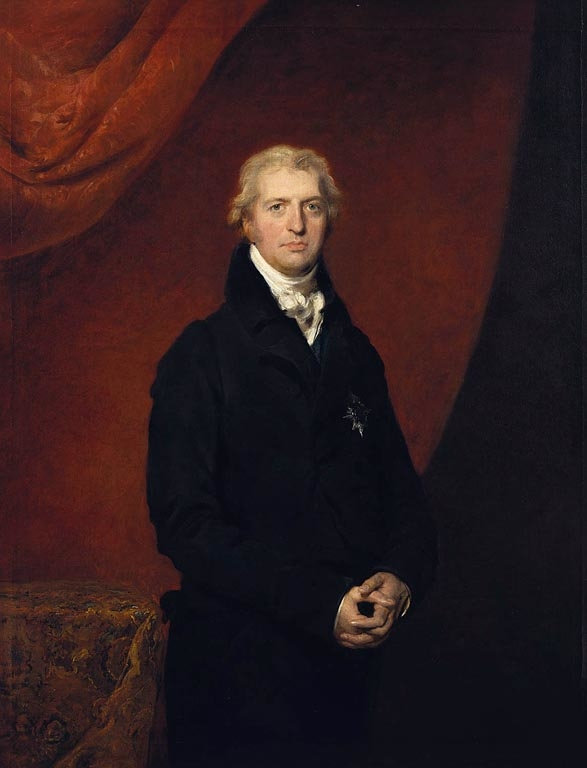
- Portrait of Lord Liverpool by Sir Thomas Lawrence, c. 1820

Prime Minister of the United Kingdom
- In office 8 June 1812 – 9 April 1827
- Monarchs: George III; George IV
- Regent: George, Prince Regent (1812–1820)
- Preceded by: Spencer Perceval
- Succeeded by: George Canning

Secretary of State for War and the Colonies
- In office 1 November 1809 – 11 June 1812
- Prime Minister: Spencer Perceval
- Preceded by: The Viscount Castlereagh
- Succeeded by: The Earl Bathurst

Leader of the House of Lords
- In office 25 March 1807 – 9 April 1827
- Prime Minister: The Duke of Portland; Spencer Perceval; Himself
- Preceded by: The Lord Grenville
- Succeeded by: The Viscount Goderich
- In office 17 August 1803 – 5 February 1806
- Prime Minister: Henry Addington; William Pitt the Younger
- Preceded by: The Lord Pelham
- Succeeded by: The Lord Grenville

Home Secretary
- In office 25 March 1807 – 1 November 1809
- Prime Minister: The Duke of Portland
- Preceded by: The Earl Spencer
- Succeeded by: Richard Ryder
- In office 12 May 1804 – 5 February 1806
- Prime Minister: William Pitt the Younger
- Preceded by: Charles Philip Yorke
- Succeeded by: The Earl Spencer

Foreign Secretary
- In office 20 February 1801 – 14 May 1804
- Prime Minister: Henry Addington
- Preceded by: The Lord Grenville
- Succeeded by: The Lord Harrowby

Personal details
- Born: Robert Banks Jenkinson; 7 June 1770 London, England
- Died: 4 December 1828 (aged 58) Kingston upon Thames, Surrey, England
- Resting place: Hawkesbury Parish Church, Gloucestershire, England
- Party: Tory
- Spouses: Louisa Hervey (m. 1795; died 1821) Mary Chester (m. 1822)
- Parent(s): Charles Jenkinson (father); Amelia Watts (mother)
- Education: Charterhouse School
- Alma mater: Christ Church, Oxford

Robert Banks Jenkinson, 2nd Earl of Liverpool (7 June 1770 – 4 December 1828), was a British Tory statesman who served as Prime Minister of the United Kingdom from 1812 to 1827. Before becoming prime minister he had been foreign secretary, home secretary and secretary of state for war and the colonies. He held the constituency of Rye from 1790 until 1803, when he was elevated to the House of Lords, where he was Leader 1803–1806 and 1807–1827.

Liverpool's fifteen years as prime minister saw his guiding Britain to victory in the Napoleonic Wars and ushering in a lasting postwar peace, but also produced unrest and radicalism at home. During the first part of his premiership, repressive measures were taken to restore order at home, the Corn Laws were introduced and income tax was repealed. In the 1820s his leadership became more liberal, and the period saw a reform of the criminal law and prisons. Throughout his tenure as prime minister, Liverpool sought a compromise over the issue of Catholic emancipation. He resigned following a stroke in February 1827. Important events during Liverpool's premiership included the defeat of Napoleon at the Battle of Waterloo, the Congress of Vienna, the 1812–1814 war with America, the Peterloo massacre, the failed Cato Street Conspiracy and the Queen Caroline affair.

Liverpool, known as Jenkinson until 1803 and as Hawkesbury from 1803 to 1808, was the son of Tory politician Charles Jenkinson, 1st Earl of Liverpool. He was educated at Charterhouse School and Christ Church, Oxford. Twice married, he had no children; on his death the earldom passed to his younger half-brother.

== Early life ==
Jenkinson was born on 7 June 1770, the son of politician Charles Jenkinson (who was later created the first Earl of Liverpool) and his first wife, Amelia Watts. Jenkinson's 19-year-old mother, who was the daughter of senior East India Company official William Watts and his wife Frances Croke, died one month after his birth. Through his mother's maternal grandmother, Isabella Beizor, Jenkinson was descended from Portuguese settlers in India, and he may also have had Indian ancestors. He was baptised on 29 June 1770 at St. Margaret's, Westminster.

Charles Jenkinson did not remarry until 1782, and as a small child Robert was looked after by his widowed paternal grandmother, Amarantha Jenkinson, in Winchester. Robert's maternal aunt, Sophia Watts, and his paternal aunt Elizabeth, wife of Charles Wolfran Cornwall, were also involved in his early years. He briefly attended schools in Winchester and Chelsea before starting, aged nine, at Albion House preparatory school in Parsons Green.

When he was thirteen, Jenkinson became a boarder at his father's old school, Charterhouse School, under the headmaster Samuel Berdmore. His father had ambitions of high office for him and exhorted him in letters to apply himself not just to his studies, but also to his appearance and personal habits. From Charterhouse, he went up to Christ Church, Oxford, in April 1787. At university he was a sober and hardworking student. He formed what was to be a lifelong friendship with George Canning, although at times they would be political rivals. Together with a few other students, including Lord Henry Spencer, they set up a debating society in which Jenkinson would present the Tory and Canning the Whig point of view. Having spent a summer in Paris, where he witnessed the Storming of the Bastille on 14 July 1789, Jenkinson was created a Master of Arts at Oxford in May 1790.

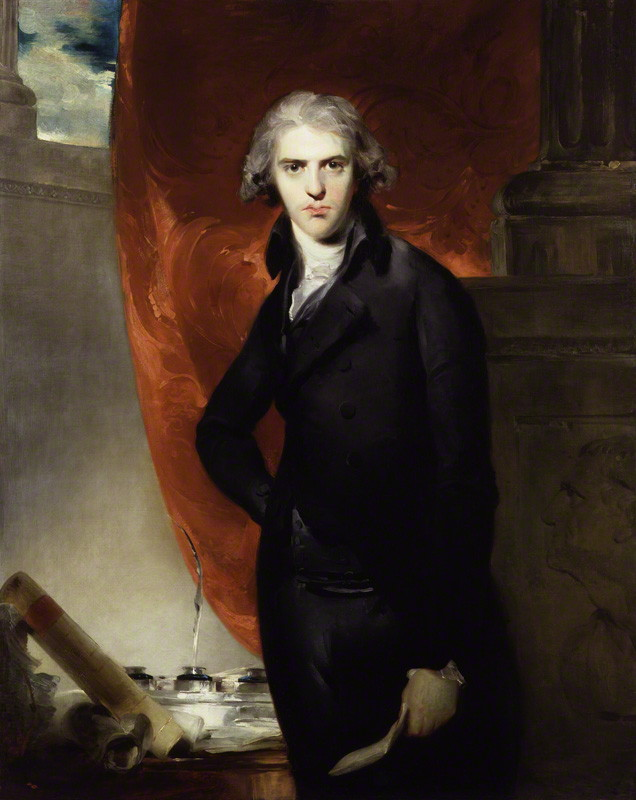
Portrait of Lord Hawkesbury by Lawrence, 1796

== Early career (1790–1812) ==
=== Member of Parliament ===
Jenkinson's political career began when he was elected to two seats in the 1790 general election, Rye and Appleby. He chose to represent the former, and never sat for Appleby. Still under age when he was elected, he spent several months touring continental Europe and did not take up his seat for Rye until after his twenty-first birthday, near the end of the 1791 session.

He made his maiden speech in February 1792, giving the government's reply to Samuel Whitbread's critical motion on the government's foreign policy. The Times praised it as "able and learned; cloathed in the best language and delivered with all the powers and graces of oratory". Several speeches followed, including one opposing William Wilberforce's motion to abolish Britain's involvement in the Atlantic slave trade and one in opposition to an inquiry into the Priestley Riots.

After the 1792 parliamentary session ended in June, Jenkinson travelled to Koblenz, which was a centre for French émigrés. French newspapers accused him of being an agent of the government; The Times denied the rumours. His services as a capable speaker for the government were recognised in 1793 when he was appointed to the India Board. After the outbreak of the War of the First Coalition with France in 1793, Jenkinson became colonel of the Cinque Ports Light Dragoons, a fencible cavalry regiment, in 1794.

There was a rare conflict between Jenkinson and his father when he fell in love with Lady Louisa Hervey, daughter of the Earl of Bristol and his wife Elizabeth. Lord Bristol approved of the match and offered a £10,000 dowry, but Jenkinson's father thought that Jenkinson should not marry before he was thirty unless it was to a fortune. He also objected to the Hervey family's eccentricity and Whig connections, only relenting after the intervention of Pitt and George III. The couple married on 25 March 1795 at Wimbledon.

Jenkinson's father was created Earl of Liverpool in May 1796, bringing Jenkinson the courtesy title of Lord Hawkesbury. The Cinque Ports Light Dragoons were posted to Scotland, where they provided a guard for the funeral of Robert Burns in 1796 and perpetrated the massacre of Tranent in 1797. Jenkinson was not present at the massacre, and "was blamed for remaining at Haddington, as his presence might have prevented the outrages of the soldiery.". In March 1799 he became a Privy Councillor, member of the Board of Trade and master of the Royal Mint.

=== Cabinet ===
==== Foreign Secretary and Home Secretary ====
Hawkesbury, as he now was, obtained his first Cabinet position in 1801 when he became Secretary of State for Foreign Affairs in Henry Addington's administration and was responsible for negotiating the Treaty of Amiens with France. In 1803 he was elevated to the House of Lords as Baron Hawkesbury in order to support the government against Lord Grenville's attacks. When Pitt returned to power in May 1804, Hawkesbury became Home Secretary and remained as Leader of the House of Lords. After Pitt's death in January 1806, the King asked Hawkesbury to form a government but he refused and instead was awarded the lucrative sinecure of Lord Warden of the Cinque Ports. Following the resignation of Grenville in March 1807, Hawkesbury advised the King to ask the Duke of Portland to form a ministry and returned to his roles as Home Secretary and Leader of the House of Lords. In December 1808, on the death of his father, Hawkesbury became Lord Liverpool. Portland was more of a figurehead than the head of government. As a result of Portland's weakness, the departments were left to themselves while the government was without a higher authority to smooth down differences between departments and arbitrate disagreements between ministers. The real figures of importance were a foursome of Pittites, consisting of Viscount Castlereagh, George Canning, Spencer Perceval and Lord Hawkesbury. The government was soon torn apart from inner disputes and rivalries. After the duel between Castlereagh and Canning, the government collapsed.

==== War Secretary ====
Liverpool accepted the position of Secretary of State for War and the Colonies when Spencer Perceval formed a ministry in November 1809. During his time in office, he ensured that the Cabinet gave sufficient support to the Peninsular War. In 1810, he was made a colonel of militia.

== Prime Minister (1812–1827) ==
=== Appointment ===
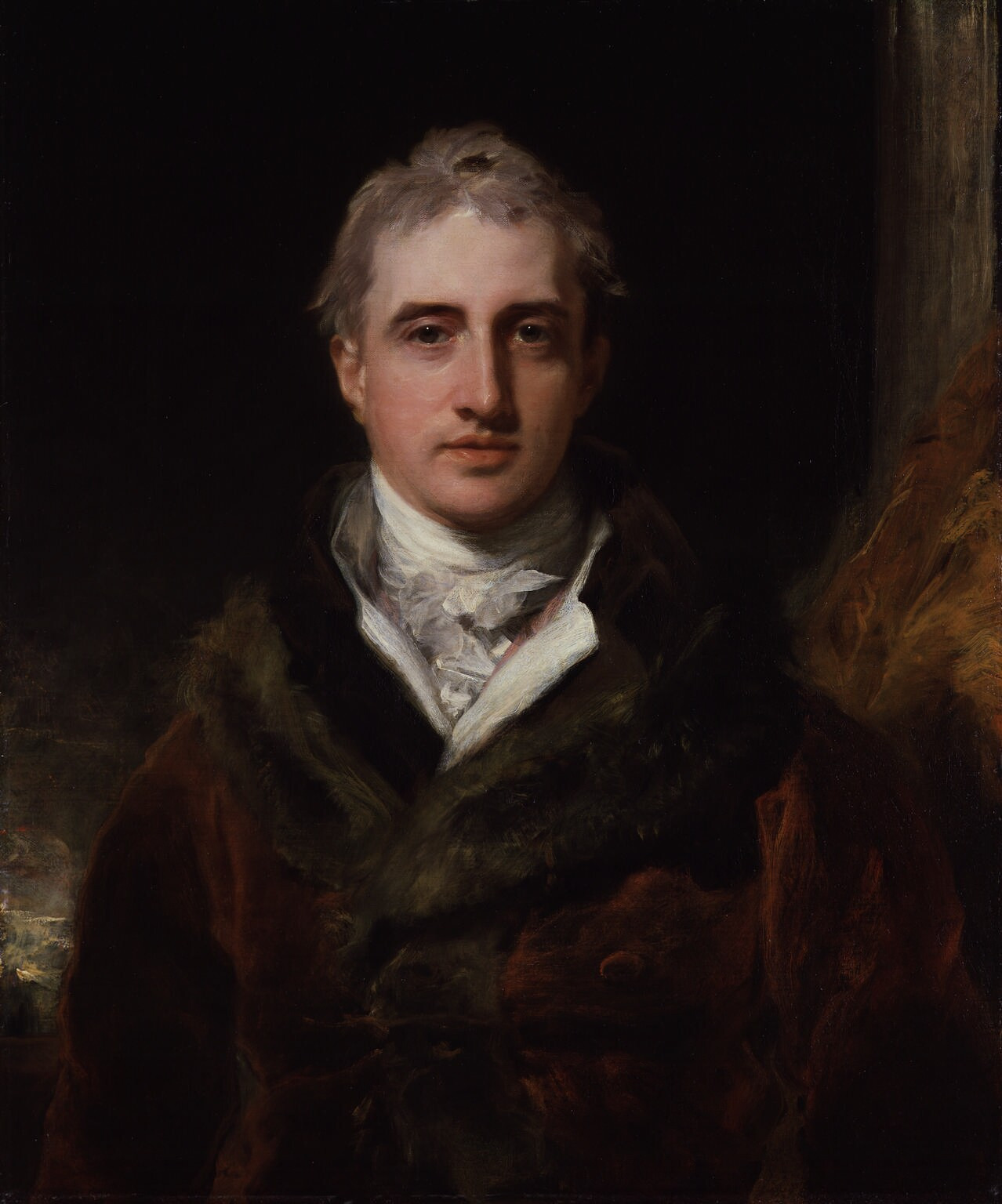
Portrait of Lord Castlereagh by Thomas Lawrence. Castlereagh served as Liverpool's Foreign Secretary from 1812 until 1822, playing a major role in assembling the coalition against Napoleon and the postwar Concert of Europe

Following the assassination of Spencer Perceval on 11 May 1812, the Cabinet proposed Liverpool as his successor, but James Stuart-Wortley moved a vote of no confidence in the House of Commons. The resolution was passed by four votes and Liverpool resigned, only to be reinstated when George, the Prince Regent, failed in his attempts to find an alternative. Liverpool was confirmed as prime minister on 8 June 1812.

Liverpool then assembled a Cabinet, with Viscount Castlereagh as Foreign Secretary and Leader of the House of Commons, Viscount Sidmouth at the Home Office, Nicholas Vansittart at the Exchequer and Bathurst at the War Office. Canning was offered a place in the Cabinet, but turned the offer down as he refused to serve under Castlereagh in the House of Commons. Liverpool's first actions as prime minister were to cancel the Orders in Council in an unsuccessful attempt to prevent the outbreak of war with the United States, and to assure the Prince Regent of the Cabinet's neutrality on the question of Catholic emancipation. He then called a general election in October 1812 in order to increase the government majority in the House of Commons.

Liverpool chose not to move into Downing Street, instead dividing his time between his London home, Fife House, Whitehall, his modest country home at Coombe, Kingston upon Thames, and Walmer Castle.

=== War ===
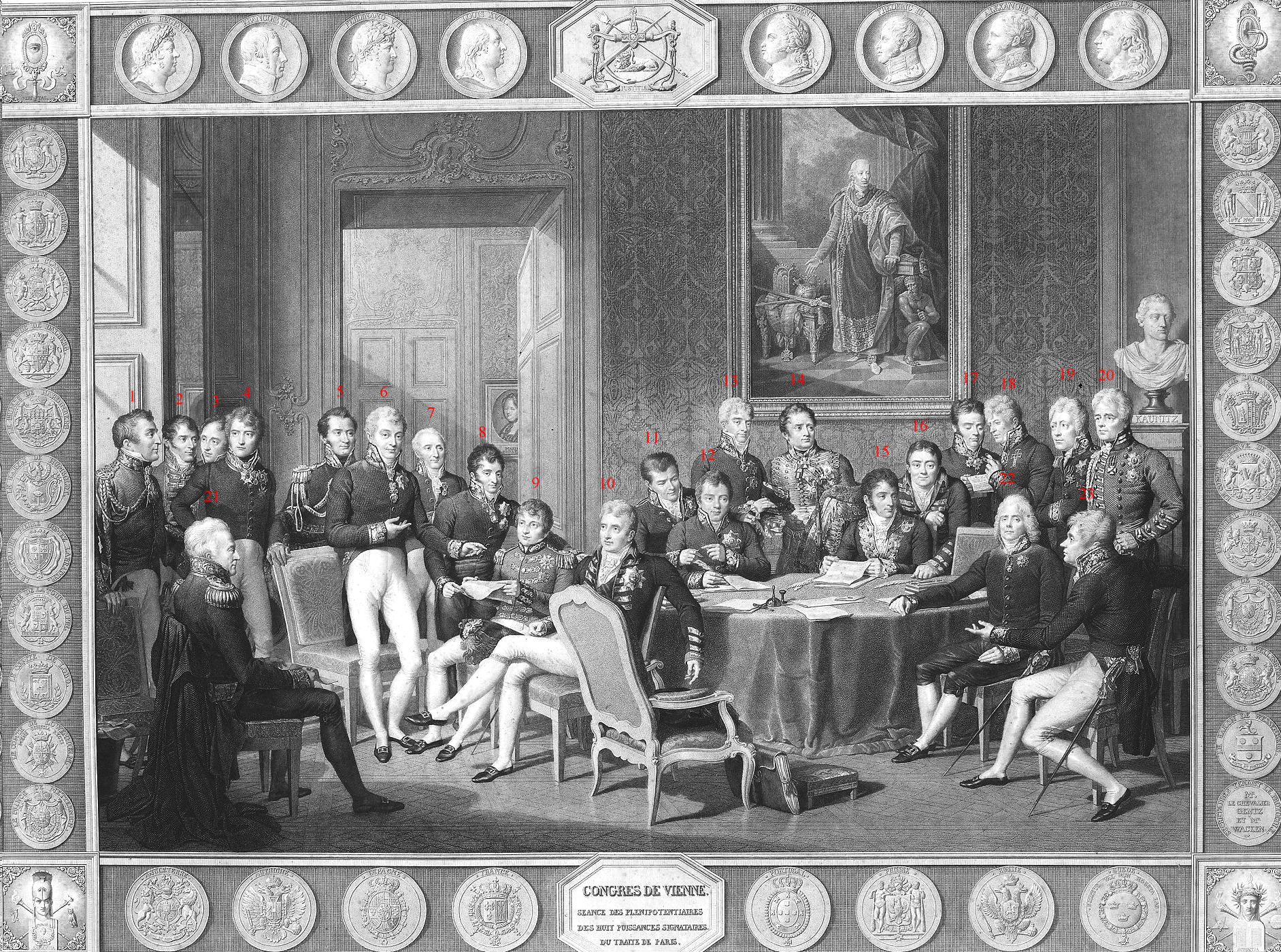
The Congress of Vienna by Jean-Baptiste Isabey

The early years of Liverpool's tenure as prime minister saw the War of 1812 with the United States, which ended when The Treaty of Ghent was signed on 24 December 1814., and the final campaigns of the Napoleonic Wars. After the downfall of Napoleon in April 1814, Liverpool was appointed to the Order of the Garter and London hosted the allied monarchs. Foreign Secretary Castlereagh was sent to the Congress of Vienna to negotiate the post-war terms of European settlement. In February 1815, Napoleon escaped from the Isle of Elba, where he had been exiled, and renewed his leadership of France until defeated at the Battle of Waterloo on 18 June 1815, nine days after the final act at the Congress of Vienna had been signed.

=== Unrest at home ===
Following the end of the Napoleonic Wars, the country experienced social and economic distress. In March 1815 Parliament passed an act forbidding the importation of wheat until the domestic price reached 80 shillings per quarter. Known as the corn law, the act protected the interests of landowners at the cost of increased bread prices. In 1816 the House of Commons voted to repeal the income tax that had been introduced to fund the war with France; Liverpool had argued that the tax should be retained in peacetime.

During the post-war years, unrest inspired by hardship or the desire for reform spread throughout the country and repressive measures were taken in response. After poor harvests led to rising bread prices, riots broke out in East Anglia in 1816. In Littleport a rioter was killed when troops opened fire and five rioters were subsequently executed. There was also a revival of Luddite activity. In November and December 1816, followers of Thomas Spence organised two meetings at Spa Fields in London at which the radical Henry Hunt was invited to speak. The second meeting was followed by the Spa Fields riots and an unsuccessful attempt to seize the Tower of London and Bank of England. The following month, the Prince Regent's carriage window was broken in a possible assassination attempt. In response to these incidents, a measure to temporarily suspend habeas corpus was passed by both Houses of Parliament.

On 16 August 1819, between 20,000 and 60,000 people gathered at St Peter's Fields, Manchester, to hear Henry Hunt and other speakers demand parliamentary reform in the form of universal suffrage and annual parliaments. Against the advice of home secretary Sidmouth, local magistrates ordered troops to disperse the crowd and arrest the speakers. Eleven people were killed and hundreds injured in what became known as the Peterloo Massacre. Later that year, after the Whigs had tried to make political capital out of the Peterloo Massacre, parliament passed the Six Acts, which were designed to curtail disturbances of the peace while preserving traditional liberties. In February 1820, the Cato Street conspiracy, a plot to assassinate the cabinet and take over the government was uncovered. Two months later, there were outbreaks of unrest in Bonnymuir and Glasgow in Scotland.

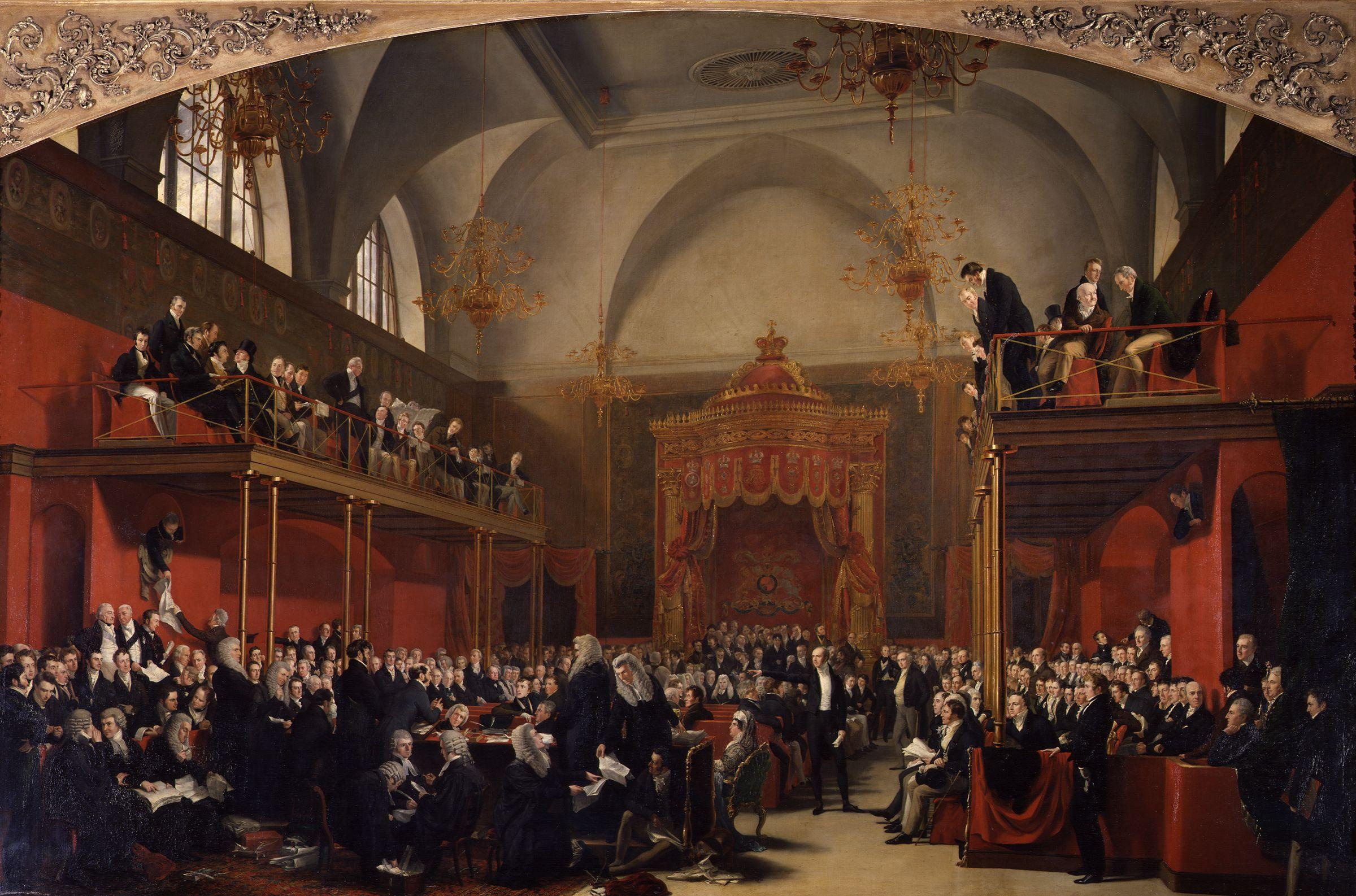
The Trial of Queen Caroline by George Hayter. George IV's insistence on trying to divorce his wife Caroline of Brunswick caused problems for Liverpool's government.

King George III died in January 1820 and the Prince Regent became King George IV. He immediately demanded a divorce from his estranged wife Caroline of Brunswick; the Cabinet preferred the option of giving her an allowance on condition she remained abroad. When Caroline returned to London in June 1820 to public acclaim, Liverpool reluctantly issued a bill of pains and penalties to deprive her of her titles and dissolve her marriage. After evidence had been heard in the House of Lords, the bill was dropped at the third reading due to a lack of parliamentary support. The King nevertheless denied Caroline entry to his coronation in July 1821; she died the following month.

=== Liberal Toryism ===
Following the reactionary early years of his premiership, the later years, from 1822 to 1827, were a more liberal phase. In January 1822 Robert Peel replaced Sidmouth as home secretary and went on to introduce a number reforms to prisons and the criminal law. Later in 1822, following the suicide of Castlereagh, Canning became foreign secretary and leader of the House of Commons, while two of his followers were promoted, F. J. Robinson to the Chancellorship of the Exchequer and William Huskisson to the Presidency of the Board of Trade.

== Retirement and death ==
On 28 February 1827, Liverpool suffered a stroke at Fife House. He made only a partial recovery and was unable to return to office; the King appointed Canning as prime minister in April 1827. Liverpool suffered another stroke at Coombe in July 1827 and died on 4 December 1828 after a third attack. He was buried at Hawkesbury Church in Gloucestershire alongside his first wife and his parents.

== Personal life ==
Liverpool married Louisa Hervey on 25 March 1795 and was widowed on 12 June 1821. His second marriage, on 24 September 1822, was to Mary, daughter of Reverend Charles Chester (formerly Bagot), who outlived him. Both marriages were childless and the earldom of Liverpool passed to his half-brother Charles Jenkinson on his death.

Liverpool was one of the founders of the National Gallery and was the first president of the Royal National Institution for the Preservation of Life from Shipwreck, which was founded in 1824 and later became the RNLI.

== Legacy ==
Lord Liverpool's reputation was poor in the 19th century and has steadily grown since the 1930s. Norman Gash argues that as prime minister he gave the nation stable leadership for 15 years (1812–1827), a tenure behind only to Walpole (1721–1742) and Pitt the Younger (1783–1801 and 1804–1806). Liverpool skillfully held together a fractious Tory party and a cabinet of strong personalities (especially Castlereagh and Canning). He guided the nation to victory over Napoleon and managed the difficult post-war transition, including massive debt reduction and economic stabilization. He led the transition to "Liberal Toryism" in the 1820s, which introduced important economic, legal, and criminal justice reforms.

Historian Robert William Seton-Watson in 1937 summed up Liverpool's strengths and weaknesses:

No one would claim Liverpool as a man of genius, but he had qualities of tact, firmness and endurance to which historians have rarely done full justice: and thus it came about that he held the office of Premier over a period more than twice as long as any other successor of Pitt, long after peace had been restored to Europe. One reason for his ascendancy was that he had an unrivalled insight into the whole machinery of government, having filled successively every Secretaryship of State, and tested the efficiency and mutual relations of politicians and officials alike.... He had a much wider acquaintance with foreign affairs than many who have held his high office.

Recently Martin Hutchinson has hailed him as "Britain's Greatest Prime Minister." argues:

Lord Liverpool was a better military strategist than Churchill or Lloyd George, ran the economy better than Pitt, Gladstone or Thatcher, dealt with post-war debt and poverty better than Attlee and won more elections than any of them. That is why Lord Liverpool, who beat Napoleon and presided over the Industrial Revolution, was Britain’s Greatest Prime Minister.

John W. Derry in 2020 says Jenkinson was:

[A] capable and intelligent statesman, whose skill in building up his party, leading the country to victory in the war against Napoleon, and laying the foundations for prosperity outweighed his unpopularity in the immediate post-Waterloo years.

Liverpool entered the top office at the age of 42 years, younger than all of his successors. He served as prime minister for a total of 14 years and 305 days, making him the longest-serving prime minister of the 19th century. As of 2025, none of Liverpool's successors has served longer.

In London, Liverpool Street and Liverpool Road, Islington, are named after Lord Liverpool. In Australia, the Liverpool Plains in New South Wales, and the Liverpool River in the Northern Territory were named for him. Likewise the city of Liverpool, New South Wales.So too was the Canadian town of Hawkesbury, Ontario.

Lord Liverpool was portrayed by American actor Gilbert Emery in the 1934 film The House of Rothschild.

== Lord Liverpool's ministry (1812–1827) ==
Lord Liverpool by Thomas Lawrence, c.1827

- Lord Liverpool – First Lord of the Treasury and Leader of the House of Lords
- Lord Eldon – Lord Chancellor
- Lord Harrowby – Lord President of the Council
- Lord Westmorland – Lord Privy Seal
- Lord Sidmouth – Secretary of State for the Home Department
- Lord Castlereagh (Lord Londonderry after 1821) – Secretary of State for Foreign Affairs and Leader of the House of Commons
- Lord Bathurst – Secretary of State for War and the Colonies
- Lord Melville – First Lord of the Admiralty
- Nicholas Vansittart – Chancellor of the Exchequer
- Lord Mulgrave – Master-General of the Ordnance
- Lord Buckinghamshire – President of the Board of Control
- Charles Bathurst – Chancellor of the Duchy of Lancaster
- Lord Camden – minister without portfolio

=== Changes ===
- Late 1812 – Lord Camden leaves the Cabinet
- September 1814 – William Wellesley-Pole (Lord Maryborough from 1821), the Master of the Mint, enters the Cabinet
- February 1816 – George Canning succeeds Lord Buckinghamshire at the Board of Control
- January 1818 – F. J. Robinson, the president of the Board of Trade, enters the Cabinet
- January 1819 – The Duke of Wellington succeeds Lord Mulgrave as Master-General of the Ordnance. Lord Mulgrave becomes minister without portfolio
- 1820 – Lord Mulgrave leaves the cabinet
- January 1821 – Charles Bathurst succeeds Canning as President of the Board of Control, remaining also at the Duchy of Lancaster
- January 1822 – Robert Peel succeeds Lord Sidmouth as Home Secretary
- February 1822 – Charles Williams-Wynn succeeds Charles Bathurst at the Board of Control. Bathurst remains at the Duchy of Lancaster and in the Cabinet
- September 1822 – Following the suicide of Lord Londonderry, George Canning becomes Foreign Secretary and Leader of the House of Commons
- January 1823 – Vansittart, elevated to the peerage as Lord Bexley, succeeds Charles Bathurst as Chancellor of the Duchy of Lancaster. F. J. Robinson succeeds Vansittart as Chancellor of the Exchequer. He is succeeded at the Board of Trade by William Huskisson
- 1823 – Lord Maryborough, the Master of the Mint, leaves the Cabinet. His successor in the office is not a Cabinet member

== Arms ==
Coat of arms of Robert Jenkinson, 2nd Earl of Liverpool
Crest A sea-horse assurgent argent, maned azure, supporting a cross patée gules. Escutcheon Azure, a fess wavy argent charged with a cross patée gules, in chief two estoiles or, and, as an honourable augmentation, upon a chief wavy of the second a cormorant sable beaked and legged of the third, holding in the beak a branch of sea-weed (called layer) inverted vert. Supporters Two hawks, wings elevated and endorsed, proper, beaked, legged and belled or, charged on the breast with a cross patée gules. Motto Palma non sine pulvere (No reward without effort). Orders The Most Noble Order of the Garter - Knight Companion (KG).

Parliament of Great Britain
Preceded by Hon. John Leveson-Gower; Richard Penn	Member of Parliament for Appleby; 1790; With: Richard Ford	Succeeded by Hon. William Grimston; Richard Ford
Preceded by William Dickinson; Charles Long	Member of Parliament for Rye; 1790–1801; With: Charles Long 1790–1796; Robert Dundas 1796–1801	Succeeded by Parliament of the United Kingdom
Parliament of the United Kingdom
Preceded by Parliament of Great Britain	Member of Parliament for Rye; 1801–1803; With: Sir John Blaquiere 1801–1802; Thomas Davis Lamb 1802–1803	Succeeded by Thomas Davis Lamb; Sir Charles Talbot
Political offices
Preceded by Sir George Yonge, Bt	Master of the Mint; 1799–1801	Succeeded by Charles Perceval
Preceded by The Lord Grenville	Foreign Secretary; 1801–1804	Succeeded by The Lord Harrowby
Preceded by The Lord Pelham of Stanmer	Leader of the House of Lords; 1803–1806	Succeeded by The Lord Grenville
Preceded by Charles Philip Yorke	Home Secretary; 1804–1806	Succeeded by The Earl Spencer
Preceded by The Earl Spencer	Home Secretary; 1807–1809	Succeeded by Richard Ryder
Preceded by The Lord Grenville	Leader of the House of Lords; 1807–1827	Succeeded by The Viscount Goderich
Preceded by Viscount Castlereagh	Secretary of State for War and the Colonies; 1809–1812	Succeeded by The Earl Bathurst
Preceded by Spencer Perceval	Prime Minister of the United Kingdom; 8 June 1812 – 9 April 1827	Succeeded by George Canning
Honorary titles
Preceded by William Pitt the Younger	Lord Warden of the Cinque Ports; 1806–1827	Succeeded by The Duke of Wellington
Peerage of the United Kingdom
Preceded by Charles Jenkinson	Earl of Liverpool; 1808–1828; Member of the House of Lords (1808–1828)	Succeeded by Charles Jenkinson
Preceded by Charles Jenkinson	Baron Hawkesbury (writ of acceleration); 1803–1828; Member of the House of Lords (1803–1808)	Succeeded by Charles Jenkinson
Baronetage of England
Preceded by Charles Jenkinson	Baronet of Walcot and Hawkesbury; 1803–1828	Succeeded by Charles Jenkinson
