= Alexander Wynch =

English merchant and civil servant

Governor of Madras
- In office 2 February 1773 – 11 December 1775
- Preceded by: Josias Du Pré
- Succeeded by: George Pigot (2nd time)

Personal details
- Born: 1721
- Died: 1781 (aged 59–60)
- Spouse(s): Sophia; Florentia Cradock

Alexander Wynch (1721 – 1781) was an English merchant, a career civil servant of the East India Company who became Governor of Madras.

== Life ==
He travelled to India at a young age and began to work, unpaid, for the East India Company at 13.

Wynch became governor of Madras in 1773. He was removed as governor in 1775, in the wake of his handling of the affair of Thuljaji, the Rajah of Thanjavur (Tanjore), who in fighting in south India had been dispossessed by Muhammed Ali Khan Wallajah, the Nawab of Arcot. The company disapproved of the change in the previous policy of ensuring the Rajah and Nawab were bound by treaty. Wynch was replaced in 1775 by George Pigot, 1st Baron Pigot, governor some years before, who was sent out from England.

In England, Wynch lived in Upper Harley Street in London, and then Gifford Lodge in Twickenham. He died at Westhorpe House in Little Marlow, Buckinghamshire.

== Family ==
Wynch was twice married, and had children by both marriages. His first wife was Sophia, daughter of Edward Croke and sister of Begum Johnson. His second wife was Florentia Cradock, whom he married in 1755.

He was father of George Wynch, and so grandfather of Florentia Sale, wife of Robert Henry Sale. His daughter Frances became notorious when she eloped with Sir William Jervis Twysden, 7th Baronet.

== Notes ==
Political offices
Preceded by Josias Du Pré	Governor of Madras; 1773–1775	Succeeded by George Pigot
