= Edward Vernon (disambiguation) =

Edward Vernon (1684–1757) was an English naval officer.

Edward Vernon may also refer to:

- Edward Vernon (Royal Navy officer, born 1723) (1723–1794), Commander-in-Chief of the East Indies Station
- Edward Vernon (Australian cricketer) (1911–1968)
- Edward Vernon (New Zealand cricketer) (1851–1902)

== See also ==
- Edward Venables-Vernon-Harcourt
