= Julia Shuckburgh-Evelyn =

British aristocrat (1790–1814)

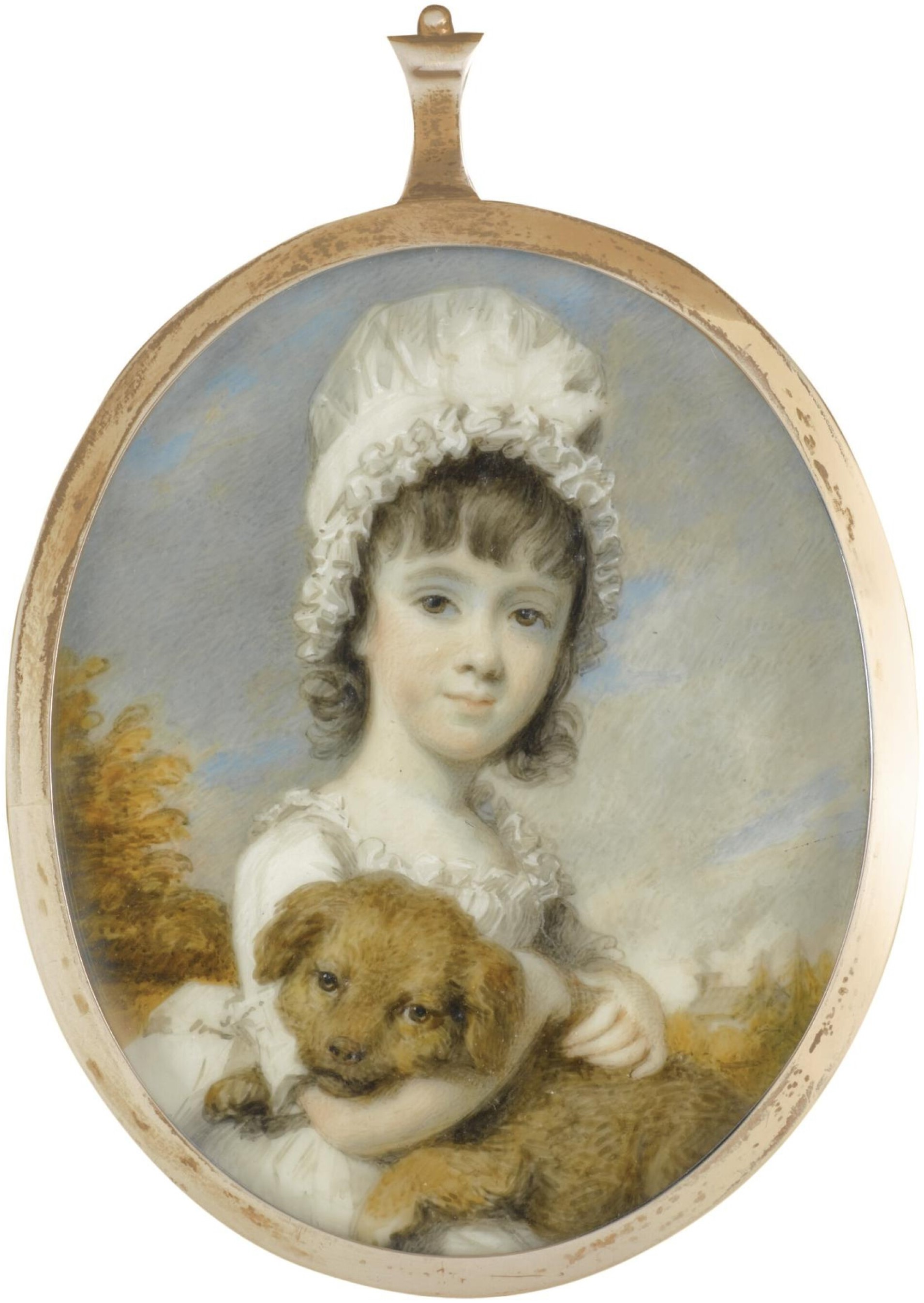
- Julia Shuckburgh-Evelyn circa 1793
- Born: 5 October 1790
- Died: 8 April 1814 (aged 23)
- Other name: Julia Jenkinson
- Spouse: Charles Jenkinson, 3rd Earl of Liverpool
- Children: Catherine Jenkinson; Selina Jenkinson; Louisa Jenkinson
- Parents: George Shuckburgh-Evelyn (father); Julia Annabella Shuckburgh-Evelyn (mother)
- Relatives: Robert Jenkinson, 2nd Earl of Liverpool (brother-in-law)

Lady Julia Evelyn Medley Shuckburgh-Evelyn (5 October 1790 – 8 April 1814) was a British aristocrat. She was daughter of George Shuckburgh-Evelyn and the wife of Charles Jenkinson, 3rd Earl of Liverpool.

== Biography ==
Julia Shuckburgh-Evelyn was born into the Shuckburgh family as the daughter of the Member of Parliament (MP) George Shuckburgh-Evelyn and his wife Julia Annabella Shuckburgh-Evelyn (1757–1797). The painter Henry Edridge produced a miniature depicting her holding a dog. She married Charles Jenkinson and became Countess of Liverpool. She gave birth to three daughters. She died after childbirth in 1814.

Her husband dedicated a monument Domestic Affliction to her memory, currently held by the University College London collection. The Earl remained a widower until his death in October 1851, aged 67.

== Descendants ==
Julia Shuckburgh-Evelyn and the Earl of Liverpool had three daughters:

- Lady Catherine Julia Jenkinson (23 July 1811 – 5 December 1877); married Col. Francis Venables-Vernon-Harcourt, son of the Most Rev. Edward Venables-Vernon-Harcourt and Lady Anne Leveson-Gower; the couple had no children.
- Lady Selina Charlotte Jenkinson (3 July 1812 – 24 September 1883); married, firstly, on 15 August 1833, William Wentworth-Fitzwilliam, Viscount Milton (1812–1835), with whom she had one child: Hon. Mary Selina Charlotte Fitzwilliam (9 January 1836 – 4 January 1899), who later married Henry Portman, 2nd Viscount Portman. Lady Selina married, secondly, on 28 August 1845, as his second wife, George Savile Foljambe (4 June 1800 – 18 December 1869), with whom she had four children:
  - Cecil George Savile Foljambe (7 November 1846 – 23 March 1907); later the 1st Earl of Liverpool (of the 2nd creation).
  - Caroline Frederica Foljambe (died 20 October 1895).
  - Elizabeth Anne Foljambe (died 2 January 1930).
  - Frances Mary Foljambe (died 25 January 1921).
- Lady Louisa Harriet Jenkinson (28 March 1814 – 5 February 1887); married John Cotes, son of John Cotes and Lady Maria Grey, a daughter of George Grey, 5th Earl of Stamford; they had two sons.
