= Charles Cecil Cotes =

British politician (1846–1898)

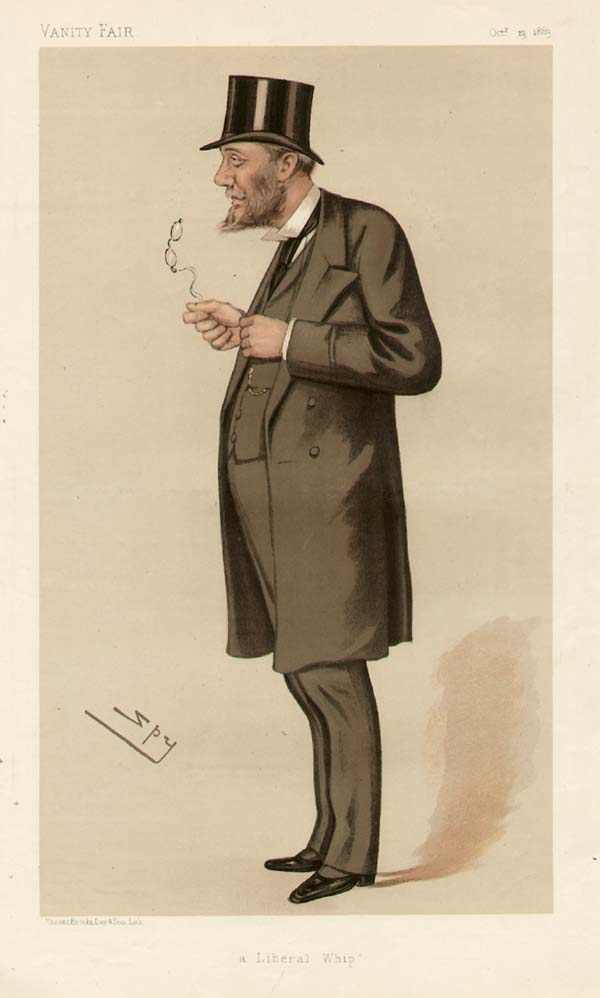
- "a Liberal Whip"; Cotes as caricatured by Spy (Leslie Ward) in Vanity Fair, October 1883

Member of Parliament for Shrewsbury
- In office 31 January 1874 – 24 November 1885 Serving with Henry Robertson

Personal details
- Born: 7 April 1846 Woodcote Hall, Shropshire
- Died: 9 August 1898 (aged 52) Woodcote Hall, Shropshire
- Party: Liberal
- Parent(s): John Cotes (father); Lady Louisa Jenkinson (mother)

Charles Cecil Cotes (7 April 1846 – 9 August 1898) was a British landowner and Liberal politician.

== Biography ==
Cotes was born in 1846, eldest surviving son of John Cotes of Woodcote Hall near Newport, Shropshire (himself a former MP) and his wife Lady Louisa Jenkinson, daughter of Charles Jenkinson, 3rd Earl of Liverpool, and thus nephew of the former Prime Minister, the 2nd Earl. He was educated at Eton College, then entered Christ Church, Oxford in 1864, graduating as B.A. in 1869.

Cotes served in the South Shropshire Yeomanry Cavalry as lieutenant before being promoted captain in 1869. This regiment amalgamated to form the unified Shropshire Yeomanry in 1872, and he continued to serve with them until he retired in 1880.

Cotes first sought election to Parliament for the then two-member borough seat of Shrewsbury at a by-election following the death of William Clement in 1870 and polled 1,253 votes but was defeated by a majority of 38 by his Conservative opponent, Douglas Straight. Cotes petitioned against the result but the case was dismissed in court with costs. He entered Parliament for Shrewsbury at the 1874 general election, and held the seat until 1885. That year Shrewsbury was reduced to a one-member seat and Cotes did not seek further election to Parliament.

When the Liberals came to power in 1880 under William Ewart Gladstone, he was appointed a Junior Lord of the Treasury, which he remained until the government fell in 1885.

Cotes played as wicket keeper in county cricket matches for Warwickshire, and Shropshire between 1864 and 1870 while playing at club level for Atcham.

Following his father's death in 1874, Cotes succeeded to his estates in Shropshire and Staffordshire in England and Montgomeryshire in Wales, which in 1876 amounted to 6,470 acres with an income of £8.860 a year. He had Woodcote Hall rebuilt after a disastrous fire. He reputedly owned the first motor car registered in Shropshire, vehicle registration number "AW1".

Cotes was a Deputy Lieutenant and Justice of the Peace for the counties of Shropshire and Staffordshire and at the time of his death was a trustee of the Harper Adams Agricultural College which was then being erected near Newport.

Cotes died suddenly at Woodcote Hall, of a heart attack, in August 1898, aged 52, and was buried on 12 August in Woodcote churchyard. He was unmarried and his estates passed to his brother Charles James Cotes (1848–1913).

Parliament of the United Kingdom
Preceded by James Figgins; Douglas Straight	Member of Parliament for Shrewsbury; 1874–1885; With: Henry Robertson	Succeeded by James Watson (representation reduced to one member 1885)
