= Ann Evelyn =

English aristocrat and heiress (died 1791)

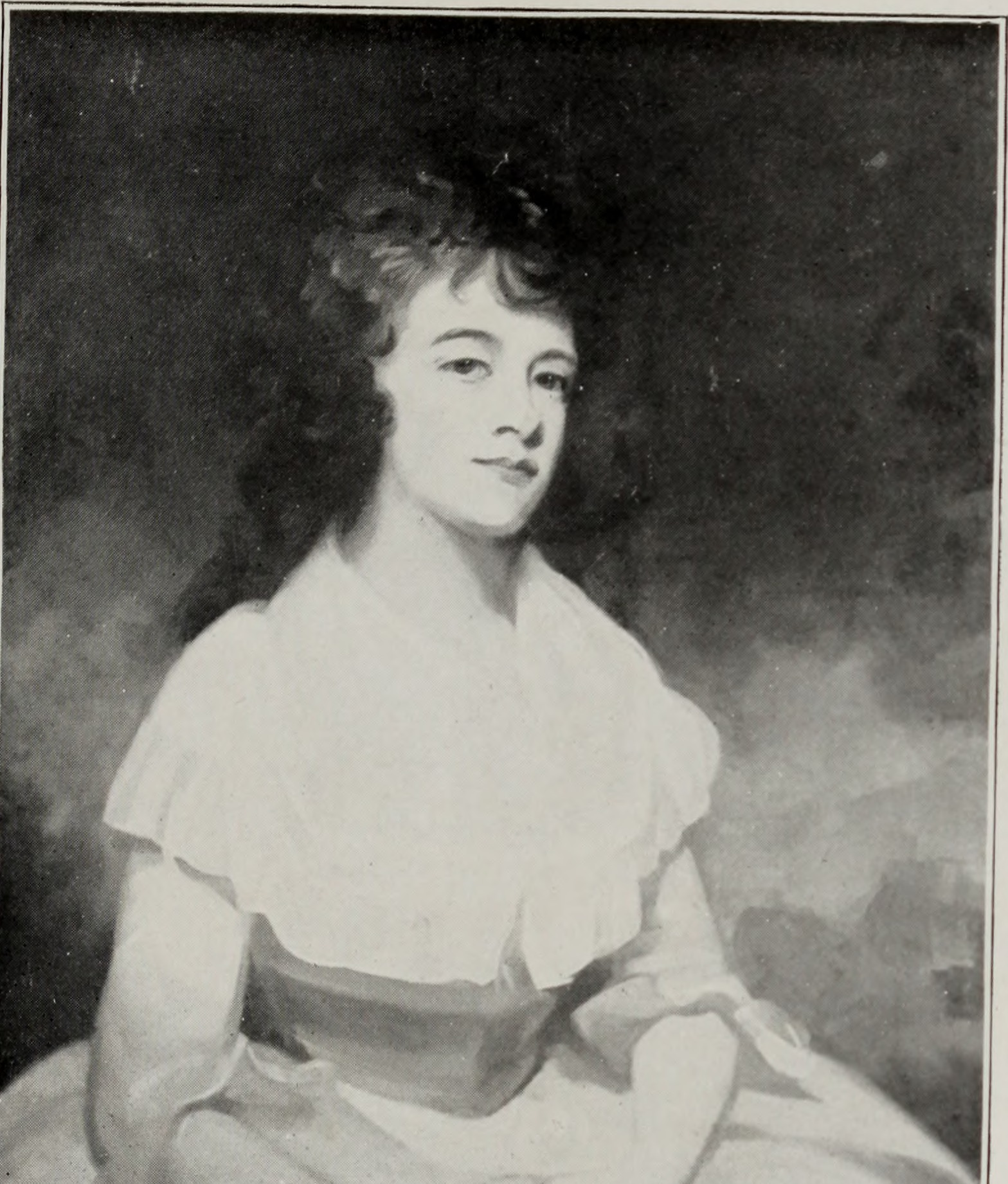
- Ann Evelyn's painting by George Romney
- Born: Ann Evelyn; 1767
- Died: 1791 (aged 24)
- Parents: James Evelyn (father); Jane Cust (mother)

Lady Ann Evelyn (1767 – 1791) was an English aristocrat and heiress.

== Biography ==
Ann Evelyn, also known as Anne, was born into the ancient Evelyn family. She was the daughter of James Evelyn (1718 –1793) and his second wife Jane Cust (1725-1791). A painting by George Romney depicting her was owned by descendent the Lord Steward Cecil George Savile, 4th Earl of Liverpool.

She was killed in a fire involving a gown in 1791. This meant that on his death James Evelyn's other daughter Julia would inherit his entire estates at Buxted Park and Felbridge. In order to inherit she and her husband George Shuckburgh-Evelyn took on the name Evelyn, which became Shuckburgh-Evelyn. This was completed by a private act of Parliament, Shuckburgh's Name Act 1794 (34 Geo. 3. c. 45 Pr.).

Her niece Julia Shuckburgh-Evelyn, the Countess of Liverpool, was married to Charles Jenkinson.
