= Robert Grant (British Army officer) =

British lcieutenant-general and royal engineer

Lieutenant-General Sir Robert Grant GCB
- Born: 10 August 1837; Malabar Hill, Bombay
- Died: 8 January 1904 (aged 66); London
- Occupations: Lieutenant-general and royal engineer

Sir Robert Grant GCB (10 August 1837 – 8 January 1904) was a British lieutenant-general and royal engineer.

== Biography ==
Grant was born at Malabar Hill, Bombay, on 10 August 1837, was younger son of Sir Robert Grant, governor of Bombay, and was nephew of Lord Glenelg. His mother was Margaret (d. 1885), only daughter of Sir David Davidson of Cantray, Nairnshire, N.B., who married as her second husband Lord Josceline William Percy, M.P., second son of George fifth duke of Northumberland.

Robert was educated at Harrow with his elder brother Charles [see below]. When he was seventeen he passed first in a public competitive examination for vacancies in the Royal Artillery and the Royal Engineers caused by the Crimean War, and was gazetted second lieutenant in the royal engineers on 23 October 1854, becoming first lieutenant on 13 December of the same year. After six months' training at Chatham Grant was sent to Scotland. In February 1857 he was transferred to the Jamaica command in the West Indies, and at the end of 1858 he served on the staff as fort adjutant at Belise in British Honduras. He passed first in the examination for the Staff College, just established; but after a few months there (Jan.–May 1859) he was aide-de-camp to Lieut.-general Sir William Fenwick Williams, the commander of the forces in North America for six years. On 8 August 1860 he was promoted second captain. He was at home for the final examination at the Staff College, in which he again easily passed first, despite his absence from the classes, and from January to June 1861 he was attached to the cavalry and artillery at Aldershot.

Finally returning from Canada in June 1865, Grant did duty at Chatham, Dover, and Portsmouth, and was promoted first captain on 10 July 1867 and major on 5 July 1872. From 1 January 1871 to 1877 he was deputy assistant adjutant-general for Royal Engineers at the war office, and from 1877 was in command of the Royal Engineers troops, consisting of the pontoon, telegraph, equipment and depot units at Aldershot. He was promoted lieut.-colonel on 1 July 1878. In May 1880 he was appointed commanding royal engineer of the Plymouth subdistrict, and on 31 December 1881 commanding royal engineer of the Woolwich district. He was promoted colonel in the army on 1 July 1882, and a year later was placed on half pay. He remained unemployed until 5 May 1884, when he was given the R.E. command in Scotland, with the rank of colonel on the staff.

On 20 March 1885 he left Edinburgh suddenly for Egypt to join Lord Wolseley, who had telegraphed for his services, as colonel on the staff and commanding royal engineer with the Nile expeditionary force. He served with the headquarters staff and afterwards in command of the Abu Fatmeh district during the evacuation, but he was taken seriously ill with fever and was invalided home in August. For his services he was mentioned in dispatches of 13 June 1885 (Lond. Gazette, 25 August 1885). Not anticipating so speedy a termination to the campaign, the authorities had filled up his appointment in Scotland and he had to wait nearly a year on half pay.

On 1 July 1886 Grant was appointed deputy adjutant-general for royal engineers at the war office. On 25 May 1889 he was created C.B., military division, and on 23 October made a temporary major general. Before he had quite completed his five years as deputy adjutant-general Grant was appointed to the important post of inspector-general of fortifications (18 April 1891), with the temporary rank of lieut.-general, dated 29 April 1891. He succeeded to the establishment of major-generals on 9 May 1891, and became lieut.-general on 4 June 1897. As inspector-general of fortifications Grant was an ex-officio member of the joint naval and military committee on defence, and president of the colonial defence committee. During his term of office important works of defence and of barrack construction were carried out, under the loan for defences and military works loan. His services were so highly valued that they were retained for two years beyond the usual term. He was promoted K.C.B. on 20 May 1896. On leaving the war office (17 April 1898) Grant's work was highly commended by the secretaries of state for war and the colonies, and he was awarded a distinguished service pension of 100l. a year. He was given the G.C.B. on 26 June 1902, and retired from the service on 28 March 1903. His health was failing, and he died on 8 January 1904 at his residence, 14 Granville Place, Portman Square, London, and was buried in Kensal Green cemetery.

Always cool and self-contained, Grant was gifted with a sure judgment and a retentive memory. A portrait in oils by C. Lutyens, painted in 1897, hangs in the R.E. officers' mess at Aldershot, and a replica was in Lady Grant's possession. She also had a portrait in oils of Sir Robert Grant by Henty, painted in 1887. He married in London, on 24 November 1875, Victoria Alexandrina, daughter of John Cotes and Lady Louisa Jenkinson of Woodcote Hall, Shropshire, and widow of T. Owen of Condover Hall in the same county. There were three children of the marriage, a daughter who died young, and twin sons, both in the army, of whom the younger, Robert Josceline, was killed at Spion Kop on 24 January 1900.

Sir Charles Grant (1836–1903), elder brother of Sir Robert Grant, was born in 1836, and educated at Harrow, Trinity College, Cambridge, and at Haileybury. He entered the Bengal civil service in 1858, was appointed a commissioner of the central provinces in 1870, and acting chief commissioner in 1879, when he became an additional member of the governor-general's council. In 1880 he was acting secretary to the government of India for the home, revenue, and agricultural departments, and in 1881 was appointed foreign secretary to the government of India. He was created C.S.I. in 1881, and in 1885 K.C.S.I. on retirement. He died suddenly in London on 10 April 1903. He married: (1) in 1872 Ellen (d. 1885), daughter of the Rt. Hon. Henry Baillie of Redcastle, N.B.; and (2) in 1890 Lady Florence Lucia, daughter of Admiral Sir Edward Alfred John Harris, and sister of the fourth earl of Malmesbury. She was raised to the rank of an earl's daughter in 1890. Sir Charles Grant edited the 'Central Provinces Gazetteer' (2nd edit. 1870).
