= George Savile Foljambe =

British aristocrat (1800–1869)

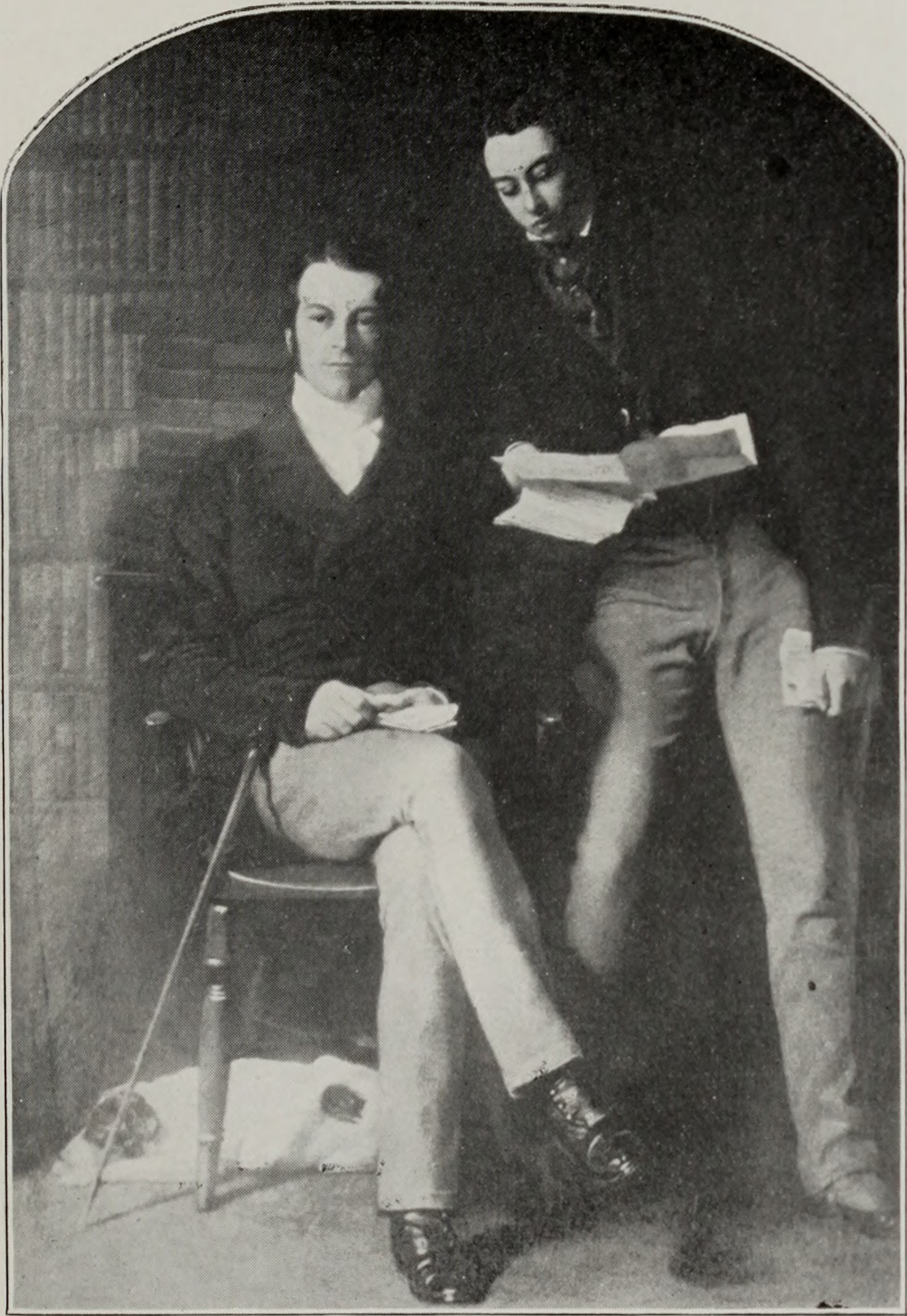
- George Savile Foljambe and his son Cecil
- Born: 4 June 1800
- Died: 18 December 1869 (aged 69)
- Spouse(s): Harriet Milner (1828–1830); Selina Jenkinson (1845–1869)
- Children: Francis Foljambe; Cecil Foljambe

George Savile Foljambe (4 June 1800 – 18 December 1869) was a British aristocrat in the 19th century. He was the father of the Earl of Liverpool Cecil Foljambe.

== Biography ==
George Savile Foljambe was born in 1800 into the Foljambe family. He was the son of John Savile Foljambe (1776–1805) and his wife Elizabeth Willoughby (1774–1858).

In 1828, he married Harriet Emily Mary Milner, a daughter of Sir William Milner, 4th Baronet. His eldest son Francis Foljambe was born in 1830 and his wife died a few months later. Foljambe remarried to Selina, Viscountess Milton, widow of William Charles FitzWilliam, Viscount Milton (son of the 5th Earl Fitzwilliam) and daughter of Charles Jenkinson, 3rd Earl of Liverpool. From this marriage, they had another son Cecil Foljambe, 1st Earl of Liverpool. They then had three daughters. He also became the step father of her daughter Mary Selina Charlotte Fitzwilliam, who later married Henry Portman, 2nd Viscount Portman.

In memory of his first wife he built St John the Evangelist, Scofton. His grandson the cricketer George Foljambe was named after him.

== Issue ==
From his first marriage

- Francis Foljambe

From his second marriage

- Cecil Foljambe, 1st Earl of Liverpool (7 November 1846 – 23 March 1907), married Louisa Howard, daughter of Frederick John Howard and had two children; later married his first wife's cousin, Susan Cavendish, daughter of William Frederick Henry Cavendish. and had eleven children.
- Frances Foljambe (17 October 1848 – 25 January 1921), married Savile L'Estrange Malone, and had four children, one of whom was the MP Cecil Malone.
- Caroline Frederica Foljambe (16 October 1850 – 20 October 1895), married Arthur Leveson-Gower and had four children.
- Elizabeth Anne Foljambe (died 2 January 1930), married William Bury and had no issue.
