= Louisa Jenkinson =

Louisa Jenkinson may refer to:

- Louisa Jenkinson, Countess of Liverpool (1767–1821), British noblewoman
- Lady Louisa Jenkinson (1814–1887), British noblewoman
