= Géraud Michel de Pierredon =

Cross pro Merito Melitensi

Count Géraud Michel de Pierredon (22 April 1916, Magné - 17 November 2006, Magné, Vienne) served as Ambassador of the Sovereign Military Order of Malta to France from 1982.

== Life ==
The son of Count Thierry Michel de Pierredon and Princess Mabel Constance de Polignac, his family were created papal counts in 1882.

The family own Château de la Roche, near Magné in France, where the Museum of the Knights of Malta is located. The Count wrote several books on the Sovereign Military Order of Malta and was a Bailiff Grand Cross of the Order, and a Grand Cross of the Order pro Merito Melitensi.

His elder daughter, Countess Marie-Ange Michel de Pierredon (born 1953), who married firstly in 1995 (divorced) the 5th Earl of Liverpool, is a Dame of Honour and Devotion of the Order of Malta. Countess Liliane Fawcett (born 1956), his younger daughter, has two daughters by her hedge fund manager husband, Christopher Fawcett.

== Works ==
- Histoire Politique de l'Ordre Souverain de Saint-Jean de Jerusalem (Ordre de Malte) Depuis 1789 (1995)
