= Edward Foljambe, 5th Earl of Liverpool =

English politician and businessman

The Right Honourable The Earl of Liverpool
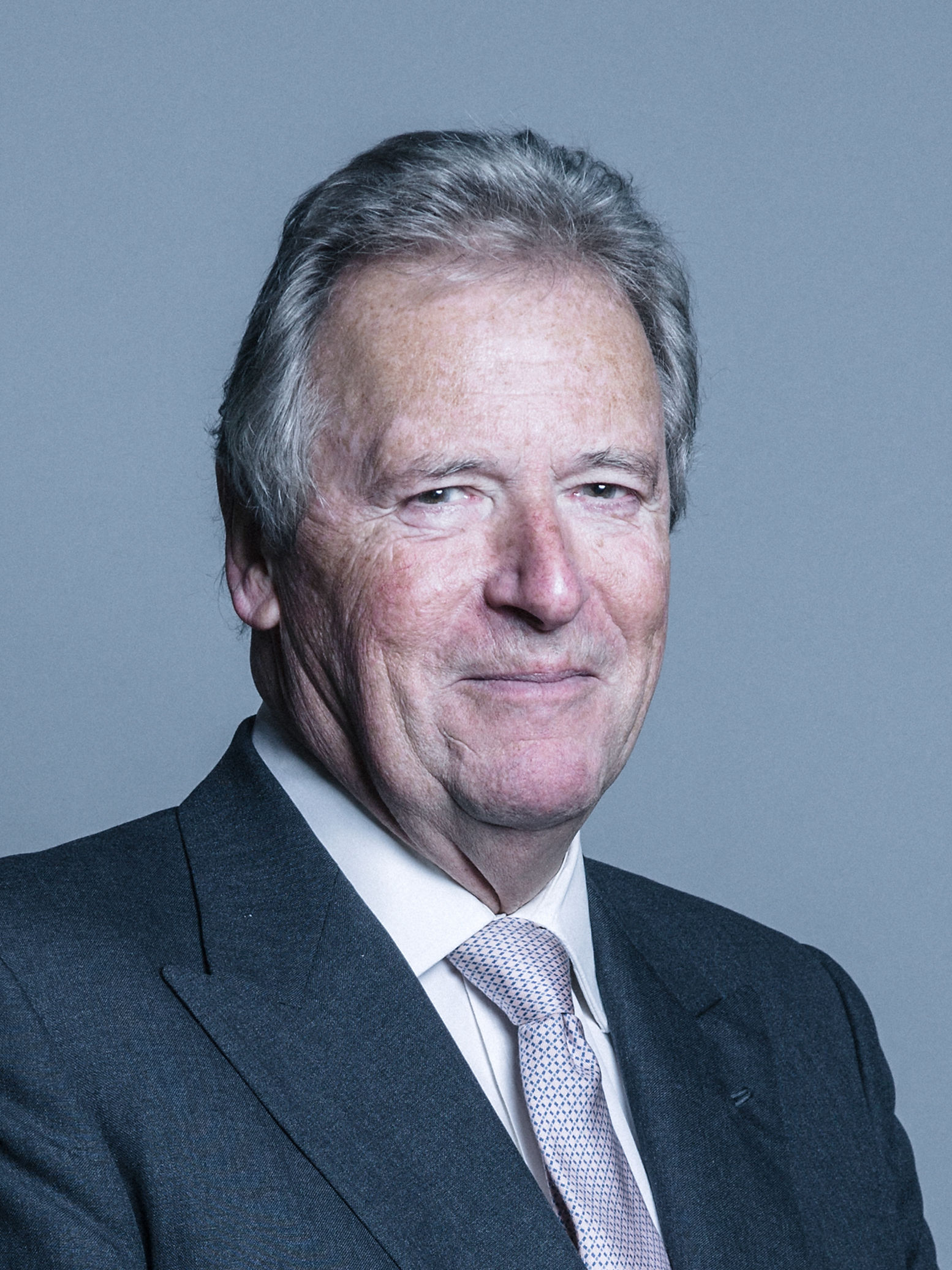
- Official portrait, 2018

Member of the House of Lords
- Lord Temporal
- Hereditary peerage 23 October 1969 – 11 November 1999
- Preceded by: The 4th Earl of Liverpool
- Succeeded by: Seat abolished
- Elected Hereditary Peer; 11 November 1999 – 17 April 2026
- Election: 1999
- Preceded by: Seat established
- Succeeded by: Seat abolished

Personal details
- Born: Edward Peter Bertram Savile Foljambe; 14 November 1944 (age 81)
- Party: Conservative
- Spouses: Lady Juliana Mary Alice Noel (m. 1970; div. 1994) Countess Marie-Ange Michel de Pierredon (m. 1995; div. 2001) Georgina Ann Lederman Rubin (m. 2002)
- Children: 2
- Occupation: Businessman, politician, peer

Edward Peter Bertram Savile Foljambe, 5th Earl of Liverpool (born 14 November 1944), is a British Conservative politician and businessman.

== Early life ==
Liverpool is the posthumous son of Captain Peter George William Savile Foljambe, Bedfordshire and Hertfordshire Regiment, (1919–1944), who was killed in World War II on 2 September 1944, and the former Elizabeth Joan Flint. His paternal grandfather was the Hon. Bertram Foljambe, sixth son of Cecil Foljambe, 1st Earl of Liverpool, the former Lord Steward of the Household to Edward VII.

Foljambe was educated at Shrewsbury School and the University of Perugia.

== Career ==
In 1969, at the age of 24, he succeeded his great-uncle as Earl of Liverpool and took his seat in the House of Lords. He was one of the 92 elected hereditary peers who remain in the House of Lords after the House of Lords Act 1999, and sat on the Conservative benches. He retired from the House on 17 April 2026.

He is a former managing director of Melbourns Brewery and director of hotel management company Hart Hambleton.

== Personal life ==
Lord Liverpool married three times—firstly to Lady Juliana Mary Alice Noel, daughter of Anthony Noel, 5th Earl of Gainsborough, and Mary Stourton, on 29 January 1970. Before they divorced in 1994, they had two children: Luke Foljambe, Viscount Hawkesbury (born 25 March 1972), and Hon. Ralph Foljambe (born 1974). He later married Countess Marie-Ange Michel de Pierredon, daughter of Count Géraud Michel de Pierredon, on 26 May 1995—they divorced in 2001. Finally, he married Georgina Ann Lederman (née Rubin) in 2002.

== Arms ==
Coat of arms of Edward Foljambe, 5th Earl of Liverpool
| Coronet A Coronet of an earl Crest 1st (of honourable augmentation granted Aug 1906): On a Chapeau Gules turned up Ermine a lion rampant of the first, charged on the shoulder with a Bezant, thereon an Eagle displayed Sable, and resting the dexter hind paw on a Plate charged with a Bend Azure, thereon three Garbs Or, and surmounted by an Escutcheon Argent charged with an Eagle displayed also Sable, charged on the breast with a Fleur-de-Lys also Or, the Lion crowned gold and supporting with the fore paws a Man-of-War's Church Pennant proper; 2nd: A Seaweed Rock proper, thereon an heraldic Sea Lion sejant Azure resting the dexter paw on an Escutcheon per fess wavy argent and azure, in chief a Cormorant Sable, beaked and legged, holding in the beak a Branch of Seaweed, called laver, inverted Vert (Liverpool), and in base a Hawk, wings elevated and addorsed Argent (Hawkesbury); 3rd: A Man's Leg unarmed, couped at the thigh, quarterly Or and Sable, spurred Gold Escutcheon Sable a Bend between six Escallops Or, and as an honourable augmentation (granted Aug 1906) on the bend in chief on an Escutcheon Vert a Key surmounted by a Baton in saltire Or Supporters On either side a Griffin, wings elevated Or, beaked, membered, ducally gorged, and on the wing three Fleur-de-Lys one and two all Azure, that on the dexter side charged on the breast with a Torteau thereon a Cross Crosslet fitchée Argent (the badge of Howard), and that on the sinister charged on the breast with a Pellet thereon a Stag's Head cabossed also Argent (the badge of Cavendish) Motto Over the 1st Crest: Bydd Ddiyagog; over the 2nd Crest: Demovres Ferme; over the 3rd Crest: Bee Fast; and under the arms: Soyes Ferme (Be steadfast) |

Peerage of the United Kingdom
| Preceded by Robert Foljambe | Earl of Liverpool; 2nd creation 1969–present Member of the House of Lords (1969–1999) | Incumbent; Heir apparent: Luke Foljambe, Viscount Hawkesbury |
Parliament of the United Kingdom
| New office created by the House of Lords Act 1999 | Elected hereditary peer to the House of Lords under the House of Lords Act 1999; 1999–2026 2026 | Office abolished under the House of Lords (Hereditary Peers) Act 2026 |
Honorary titles
| Preceded by The Lord Trefgarne | Longest-serving member in the House of Lords; 2026 | Succeeded by The Earl of Caithness |
