= Edward Venables-Vernon-Harcourt =

Archbishop of York from 1808 to 1847

The Most Reverend and Right Honourable Edward Venables-Vernon-Harcourt
- Archbishop of York
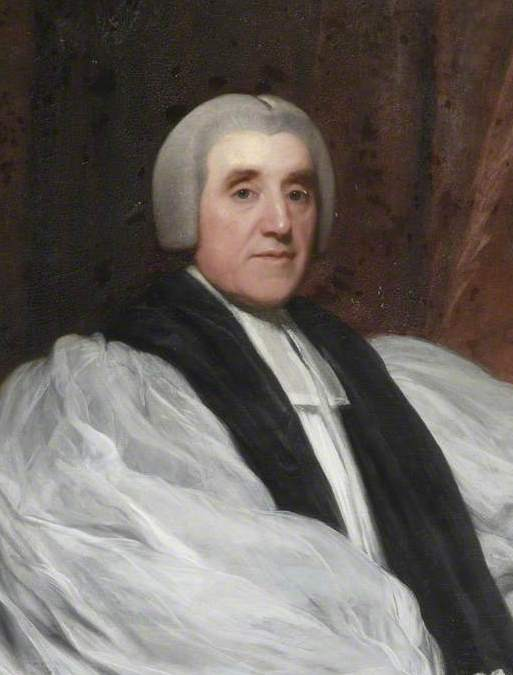
- Portrait by Thomas Phillips
- Province: Province of York
- Diocese: Diocese of York
- Elected: 26 November 1807 (nominated); 19 January 1808 (confirmed)
- Term ended: 1847 (death)
- Predecessor: William Markham
- Successor: Thomas Musgrave
- Other post: Bishop of Carlisle (1791–1807)

Personal details
- Born: Edward Venables-Vernon; 10 October 1757 Sudbury Hall, Derbyshire, England
- Died: 5 November 1847 (aged 90) Bishopthorpe, Yorkshire, England
- Buried: Stanton Harcourt, Oxfordshire
- Denomination: Anglican
- Parents: George Venables-Vernon, 1st Baron Vernon; Martha Harcourt
- Spouse: Lady Anne Leveson-Gower
- Children: 16 children
- Profession: Clergyman
- Education: Westminster School
- Alma mater: Christ Church, Oxford

Edward Venables-Vernon-Harcourt (10 October 1757 – 5 November 1847) was a Church of England bishop. He was the Bishop of Carlisle from 1791 to 1807 and then the Archbishop of York until his death.

He was the third son of George Venables-Vernon, 1st Baron Vernon (1709–1780), and Martha Harcourt, sister to the 1st Earl Harcourt. Later he assumed the additional name of Harcourt on succeeding to the property including Nuneham House from his childless first cousin, the 3rd Earl Harcourt, in 1831.

== Early life ==
Edward Venables-Vernon was born at Sudbury Hall, Derbyshire on 10 October 1757. He was educated at Westminster School; matriculated at Christ Church, Oxford on 2 July 1774; was elected fellow of All Souls College in 1777 and graduated B.C.L. 27 April 1786, and D.C.L., 4 May following. After his ordination he was instituted to the family living of Sudbury. He became a canon of Christ Church, Oxford, 13 October 1785, and a prebendary of Gloucester on 10 November in the same year. He resigned his prebendal stall in 1791, but held his other appointments to 1808. His sister Elizabeth married their first cousin the 2nd Earl Harcourt.

On 18 August 1791 he was nominated as the Bishop of Carlisle in succession to John Douglas and was consecrated on 6 November following. For 16 years he administered the affairs of the see of Carlisle with good sense and discretion, spending more than the whole income of the see upon the wants of his diocese.

== Archbishop of York ==
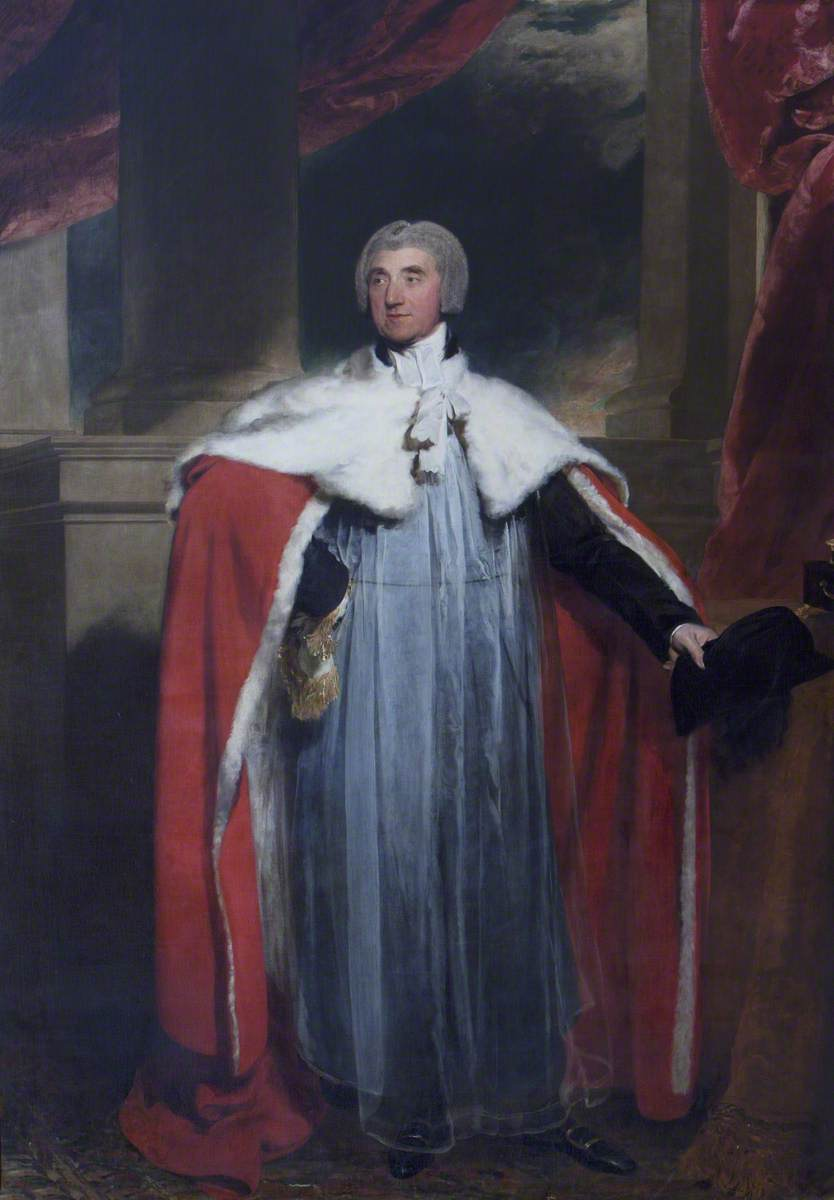
Portrait by Thomas Lawrence. C. 1823, on display at Sudbury Hall

After the death of Archbishop William Markham. Venables-Vernon was nominated on 26 November 1807 as archbishop of York, and was confirmed in St. James's Church, Westminster on 19 January 1808. In the same year, on 20 January, he was gazetted a privy councillor, and made Lord High Almoner to George III, an office which he also held under Queen Victoria's reign.

According to the account of Dean Alford:

"Archbishop Harcourt was very fond of hunting, so fond that he was very near refusing the archbishopric because he thought if he accepted he should have to give it up. He consulted a friend, who said that he must take counsel with others. 'Of course I should never join the meet,’ said the Archbishop, 'but you know I might fall in with the hounds by accident.' After some time the friend came back and said that on the whole the party considered that the Archbishop might hunt, provided he did not shout."

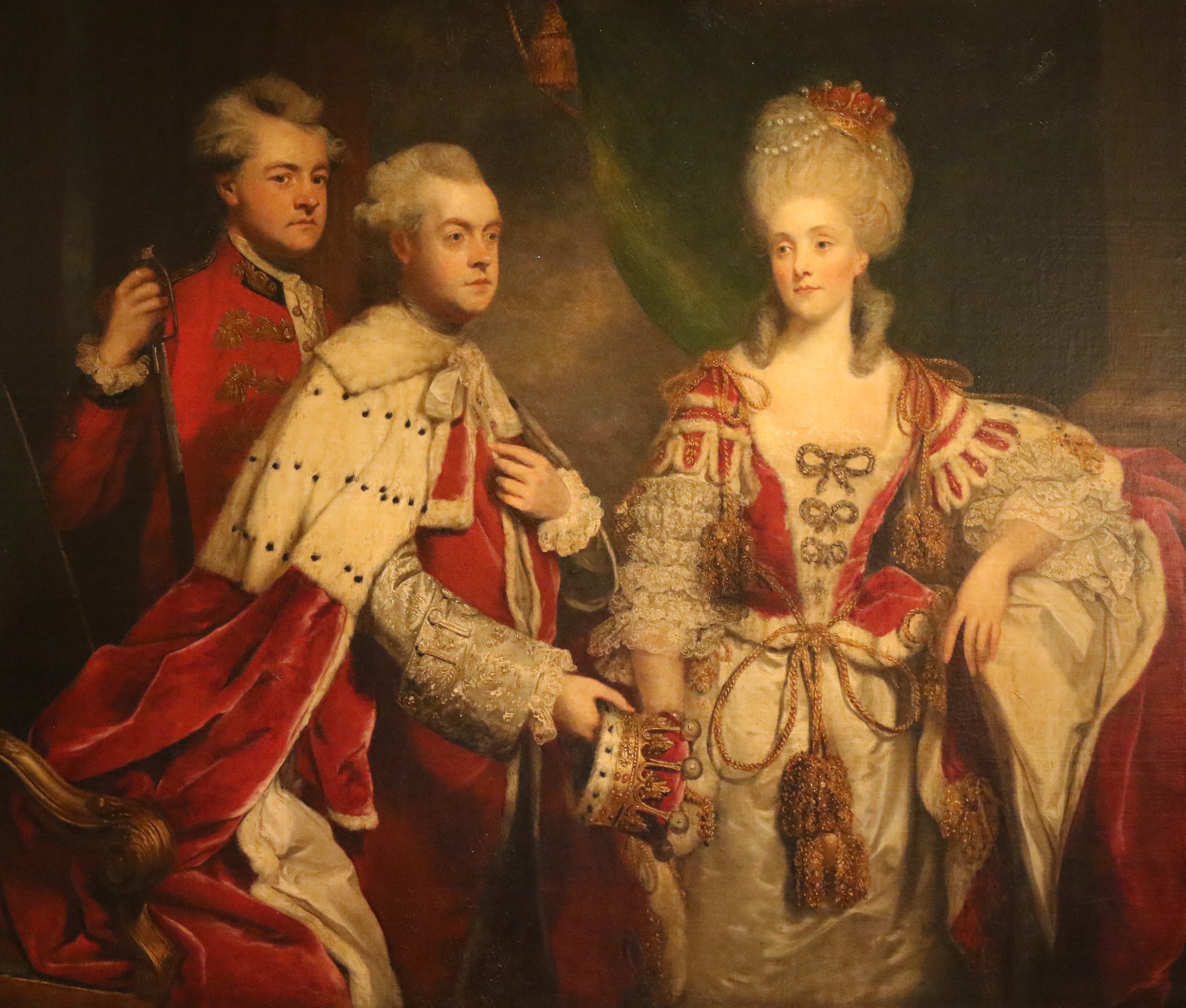
His sister Elizabeth, Countess Harcourt and their first cousins, the 2nd and 3rd Earl Harcourt. C. 1780, By Sir Joshua Reynolds.

Venables-Vernon was a member of the queen's council who had charge of George III during his illness. He was an eloquent speaker, and occasionally spoke in the House of Lords on ecclesiastical matters, but usually abstained from political contentions. He lived under five successive monarchs, and was respected for benevolence and simplicity of character. On 15 January 1831 he took the surname of Harcourt on inheriting the large estates of the Harcourt family, which came to him on the death of his first cousin, Field-marshal William, third and last Earl Harcourt.

In 1835 he was appointed one of the first members of the Ecclesiastical Commission. In 1838 he was offered the renewal of the Harcourt peerage, but declined it, not wishing to be fettered in his parliamentary votes. York Minster twice suffered fires during his primacy, 1829 and 1841, and he contributed largely to both restorations.

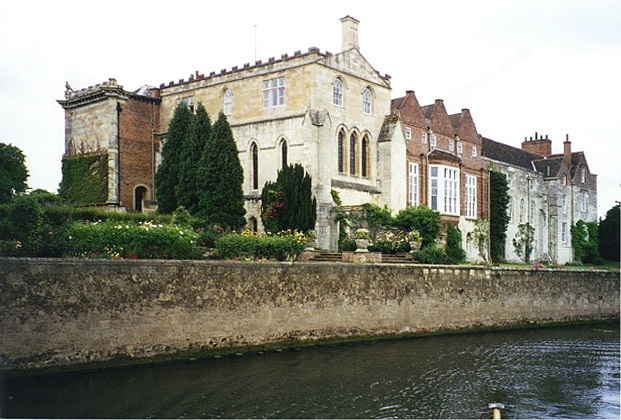
The residence of the Archbishops of York: Bishopthorpe Palace (viewed from the Ouse in 1995)

Archbishop Harcourt preached his valedictory sermon in York Minster on 13 November 1838. He continued to enjoy good health, and as late as 1 November 1847 visited York and inspected the repairs of the chapterhouse. Early in October 1847, however, Harcourt fell into an ornamental pool at Bishopthorpe after a bridge on which he was walking collapsed. Though he continued his engagements, he was left partially paralysed. He died at the palace at Bishopthorpe, near York, on 5 November 1847, and was buried at Stanton Harcourt, Oxfordshire, 13 November.

A memorial to Harcourt was erected in York Minster in 1855 sculpted by Matthew Noble.

== Family ==
On 5 February 1784 he married Lady Anne Leveson-Gower, third daughter of Granville Leveson-Gower, 1st Marquess of Stafford and Lady Louisa Egerton, daughter of Scroop Egerton, 1st Duke of Bridgewater. They had sixteen children. His wife predeceased him at Bishopthorpe Palace on 16 November 1832, aged 72.

His second son, the Revd. Leveson Vernon Harcourt, was chancellor of York, an author of The Doctrine of the Deluge and of other theological works. His fourth son was William Vernon Harcourt, the founder of the British Association for the Advancement of Science. Two of his sons became Admirals and his youngest daughter, Georgiana, distinguished herself as a translator.

The children included:

- George Granville Vernon-Harcourt (6 Aug 1785 – 19 Dec 1861)
- The Reverend Leveson Venables-Vernon-Harcourt (1788 – 26 Jul 1860)
- Reverend William Vernon Harcourt (Jun 1789 – 1 Apr 1871) inherited Nuneham House.
- Admiral Frederick Edward Vernon-Harcourt (15 Jun 1790 – 1 May 1883), forefather to the 11th Baron Vernon
- Lt.-Col. Henry Venables-Vernon-Harcourt (1791 – 26 Feb 1853)
- Granville Harcourt-Vernon (26 Jul 1792 – 8 Dec 1879)
- Vice-Admiral Octavius Henry Cyril Harcourt (26 Dec 1793 – 14 Aug 1863)
- The Reverend Charles Vernon-Harcourt (14 Nov 1798 – 10 Dec 1870)
- Colonel Francis Venables-Vernon-Harcourt (6 Jan 1801 – 23 Apr 1880), married Lady Catherine Jenkinson (23 July 1811 – 5 December 1877), daughter of Charles Jenkinson, 3rd Earl of Liverpool and Julia Shuckburgh-Evelyn.
- Egerton Vernon-Harcourt (1803 – 19 Oct 1883 Whitwell Hall, Yorkshire), who was a president of the United Debating Society in 1824 while educated at Christ Church, Oxford.
- Louisa Augusta Venables-Vernon-Harcourt (c. 1804 – 4 Aug 1869), who married Sir John Vanden-Bempde-Johnstone, Baronet, of Hackness, on 14 June 1825 at St. George's, Hanover Square. He died 24 Feb 1869, the widow dying only a few months later on 4 Aug 1869, at Eridge Castle, Kent.
- Georgiana Charlotte Frances Harcourt (1807–1886)

== Cato Street conspiracy ==
As a director of the Ancient Concerts, Harcourt entertained his fellow-directors (the prince regent and Prince Adolphus – the Duke of Cambridge, the Duke of Cumberland (later the King of Hanover), and the Duke of Wellington) at his house in Grosvenor Square on 23 February 1821. On the same night the Cato Street conspirators had designed the murder of the cabinet ministers at the house adjoining Harcourt's, where the ministers had agreed to dine with Lord Harrowby.

== Harcourt's publications ==
1. A Sermon preached before the Lords on the Anniversary of the Martyrdom of King Charles the First, 1794.
2. A Sermon preached before the Society for the Propagation of the Gospel, 1798.
3. A Sermon preached at the Coronation of George IV, 1821, which was twice reprinted.

An account of the life of Margaret Godolphin who died in 1678 was written by John Evelyn and this was passed down through his family to Harcourt. Harcourt allowed it to be published in 1847 with the assistance of the Bishop of Oxford.

== Ancestry ==
Ancestors of Edward Venables-Vernon-Harcourt

8. George Vernon
4. Henry Vernon
9. Catherine Vernon
2. George Venables-Vernon, 1st Baron Vernon
10. Thomas Pigott
5. Anne Pigott
11. Mary Venables
1. Edward Venables-Vernon-Harcourt
12. Simon Harcourt, 1st Viscount Harcourt
6. Hon. Simon Harcourt
13. Rebecca Clarke
3. Hon. Martha Harcourt
14. John Evelyn
7. Elizabeth Evelyn
15. Martha Spencer

== Arms ==
Coat of arms of Edward Venables-Vernon-Harcourt

Notes
When Harcourt was serving as a bishop his arms would be displayed impaled with the arms of the diocese and topped by a mitre.
Escutcheon
Quarterly 1st & 4th Gules two bars Or 2nd Argent a fret Sable 3rd Or on a fess Azure three garbs of the first.

== See also ==
- Vernon Islands

Church of England titles
Preceded by John Douglas	Bishop of Carlisle; 1791–1807	Succeeded by Samuel Goodenough
Preceded by William Markham	Archbishop of York; 1808–1847	Succeeded by Thomas Musgrave
