= Frederick John Howard =

British politician

Frederick John Howard (1 March 1814 – 28 February 1897) was a British Member of Parliament.

== Biography ==
Howard, born on 1 March 1814, was the eldest son of Major the Hon. Frederick Howard, third son of Frederick Howard, 5th Earl of Carlisle. His mother was Susan Lambton, daughter of William Henry Lambton. (Note: Howard's father was killed at the Battle of Waterloo in 1815. His mother married her second husband, General the Hon. Henry Frederick Compton-Cavendish, in 1819.) Howard was elected to the House of Commons for Youghal in 1837, a seat he held until 1841. He was also a Deputy Lieutenant for Suffolk. Howard died on 28 February 1897.

== Family ==
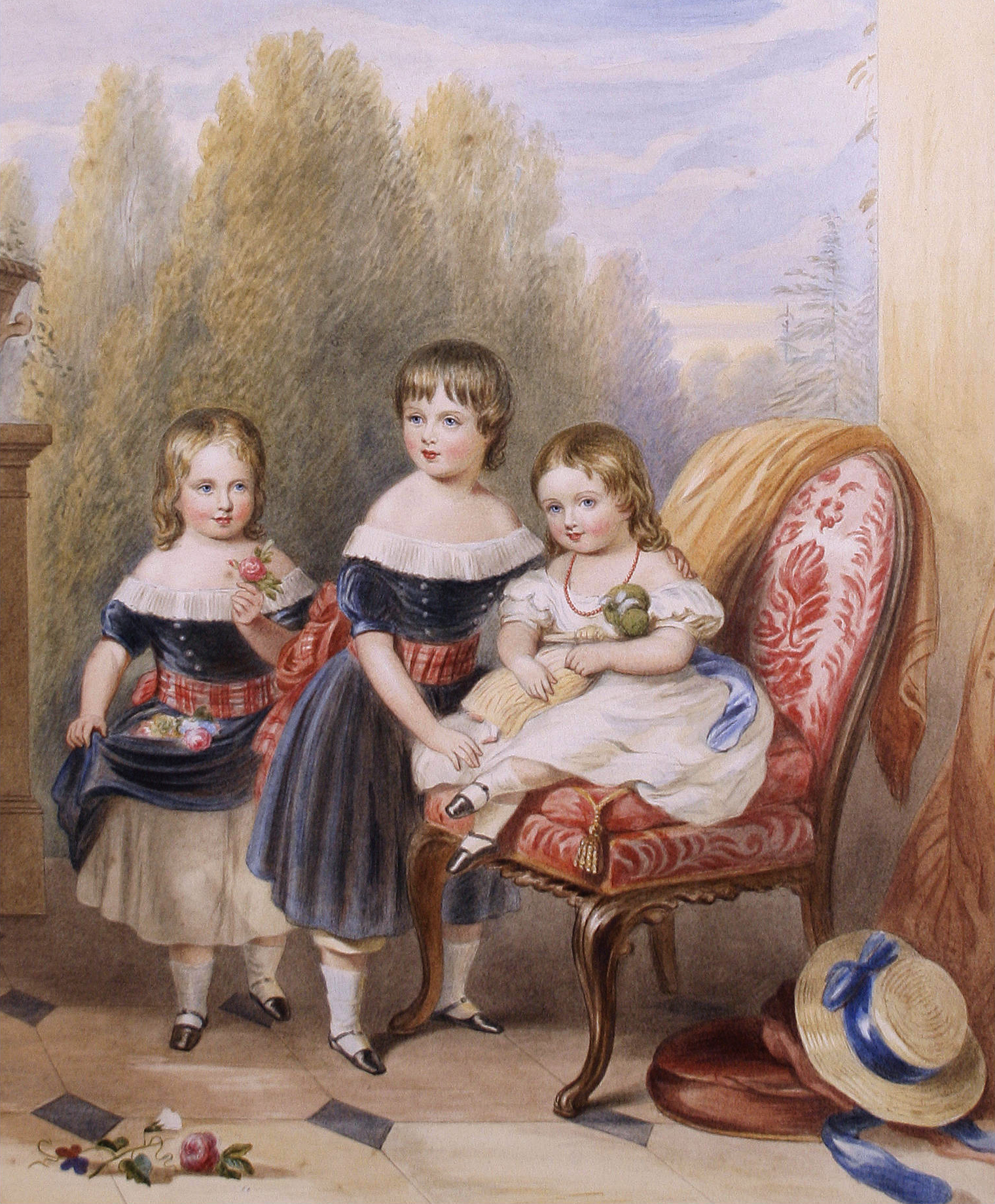
The three eldest children of Frederick John Howard (1814-1897) and Lady Fanny Cavendish. William and George, standing; Louisa, seated (Robert Dowling, 1844)

Howard married Lady Fanny (December 1885), daughter of the Hon. William Cavendish, in 1837. They had five sons and three daughters. Their eldest daughter Louise (died 7 October 1871 in childbirth) married Cecil Foljambe, son of George Savile Foljambe and Selina Jenkinson.

Parliament of the United Kingdom
Preceded by John O'Connell	Member of Parliament for Youghal; 1837–1841	Succeeded by Charles Cavendish
