= Selina Jenkinson =

British aristocrat (1812–1883)

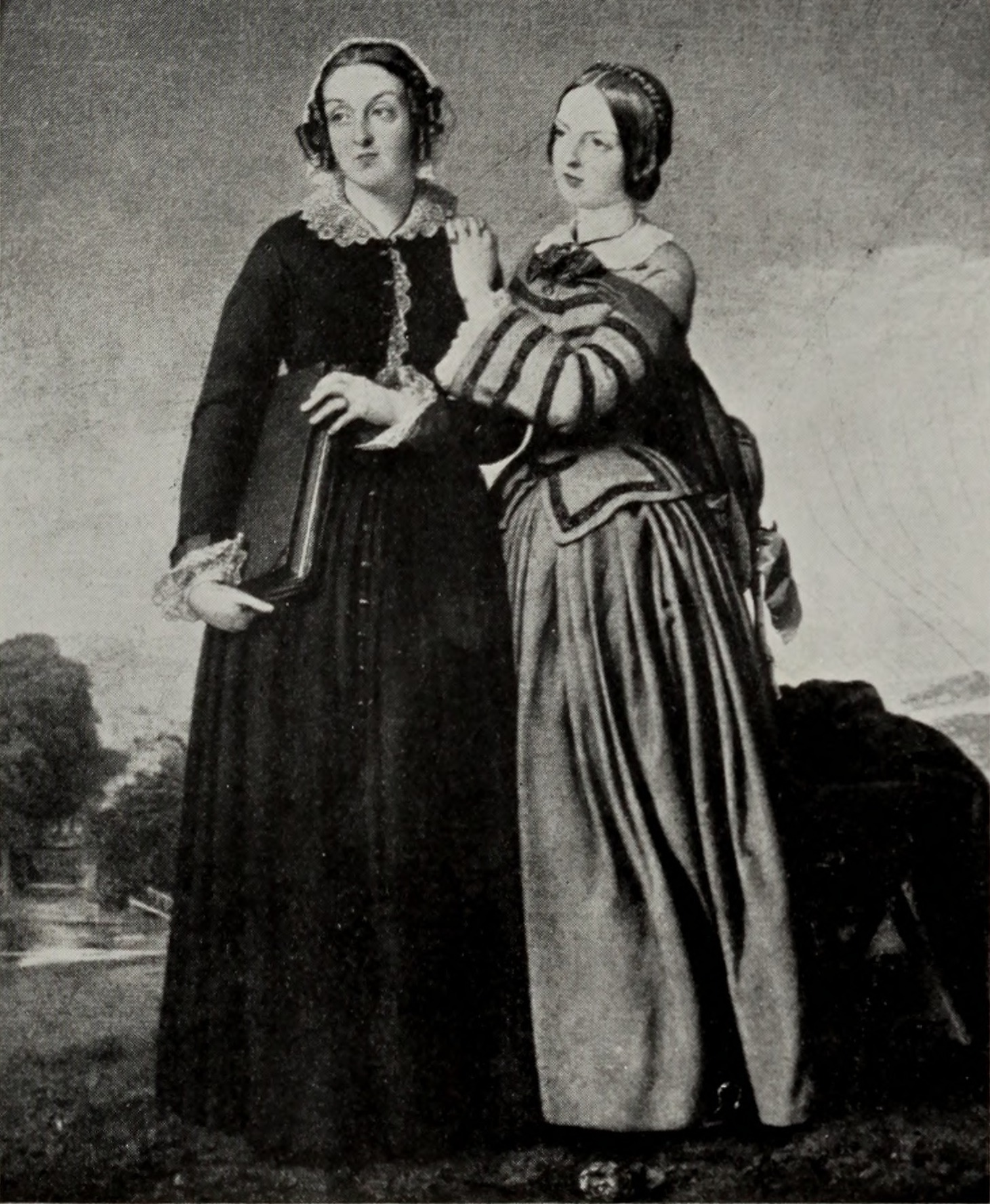
- Selina Jenkinson and her daughter Mary
- Born: 3 July 1812; St. Marylebone, London, England
- Died: 24 September 1883 (aged 71); Strand, London, England
- Buried: Scofton, Worksop, Nottinghamshire, England.
- Spouses: William Wentworth-Fitzwilliam (m. 1833); George Savile Foljambe (m. 1845)
- Issue: 4 (including Cecil Foljambe)
- Father: Charles Jenkinson, 3rd Earl of Liverpool
- Mother: Julia Shuckburgh-Evelyn

Lady Selina Charlotte Jenkinson, Viscountess Milton (3 July 1812 – 24 September 1883), also known by her married names as Selina Wentworth-Fitzwilliam and Selina Foljambe, was a British aristocrat in the 19th century. She was the mother of the Earl of Liverpool Cecil Foljambe.

== Biography ==
Selina Jenkinson was born in London, England, and was christened on 28 July 1812 at St Marylebone Parish Church. She was the second child of the influential politician Charles Jenkinson, 3rd Earl of Liverpool, and his wife Julia Shuckburgh-Evelyn. She had two sisters Catherine and Louisa.

She was a niece of the Prime Minister Robert Jenkinson, 2nd Earl of Liverpool. When her father died she took ownership of a rare collection of works of William Shakespeare. On 15 August 1833, she married William Charles Wentworth-FitzWilliam, Viscount Milton (1812–1835), with whom she had one child, a daughter. Her husband was one of the youngest people to serve in Parliament in the modern era. They lived at Cockglode House in the Sherwood Forest. Her husband died within two years of marriage.

On 28 August 1845, she remarried. She became the second wife of George Savile Foljambe and they had four children. Their eldest son by this marriage inherited property from his mother, and was created Earl of Liverpool. Cecil Foljambe, 1st Earl of Liverpool was a leading Liberal politician who was Lord Steward of the Household and served in the New Zealand Wars.

Lady Selina died on 24 September 1883. A memorial to her is at St. John the Divine Church in Felbridge.

== Issue ==
From her first marriage:

- Hon. Mary Selina Charlotte Fitzwilliam (9 January 1836 – 4 January 1899), who later married Henry Portman, 2nd Viscount Portman.

From her second marriage

- Cecil Foljambe, 1st Earl of Liverpool (7 November 1846 – 23 March 1907), married Louisa Howard, daughter of Frederick John Howard and had two children; later married his first wife's cousin, Susan Cavendish, daughter of William Frederick Henry Cavendish. and had eleven children.
- Frances Foljambe (17 October 1848 – 25 January 1921), married Savile L'Estrange Malone, and had four children, one of whom was the MP Cecil Malone.
- Caroline Frederica Foljambe (16 October 1850 – 20 October 1895), married Arthur Leveson-Gower and had four children.
- Elizabeth Anne Foljambe (died 2 January 1930), married William Bury and had no issue.
