= James Figgins =

English Conservative politician

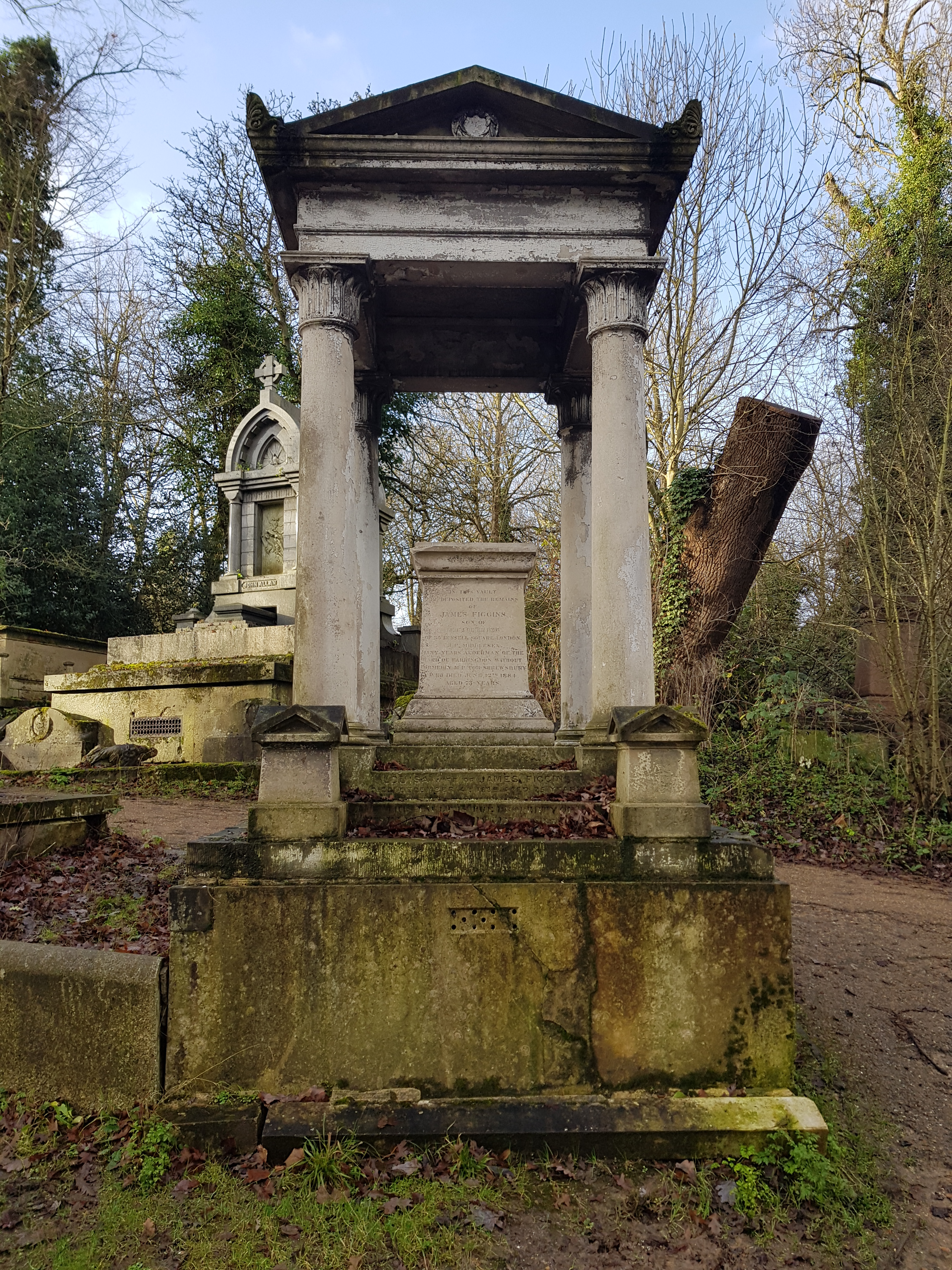
Tomb of James Figgins, his father and other relatives, Nunhead Cemetery

James Figgins (16 April 1811 – 12 June 1884) was an English Conservative politician who sat in the House of Commons from 1868 to 1874.

Figgins was the son of type-founder Vincent Figgins of Peckham Rye and his wife Elizabeth. He was educated by Dr Brown, of Esher and joined the family business. He was a J.P. for Middlesex and was Sheriff of London and Middlesex from 1865 to 1866.

At the 1868 general election Figgins was elected member of parliament for Shrewsbury. He held the seat until 1874.

Figgins married Louisa Beckwith, daughter of W. A. Beckwith of Skinner Street, in 1836.

Figgins died at the age of 73 and is buried with his father and brother in Nunhead Cemetery.

Parliament of the United Kingdom
Preceded by George Tomline; William James Clement	Member of Parliament for Shrewsbury; 1868–1874; With: William James Clement to 1870; Douglas Straight from 1870	Succeeded by Charles Cecil Cotes; Henry Robertson
