= Arthur Foljambe, 2nd Earl of Liverpool =

British politician (1870–1941)

The Right Honourable The Earl of Liverpool GCB GCMG GBE MVO PC JP DL
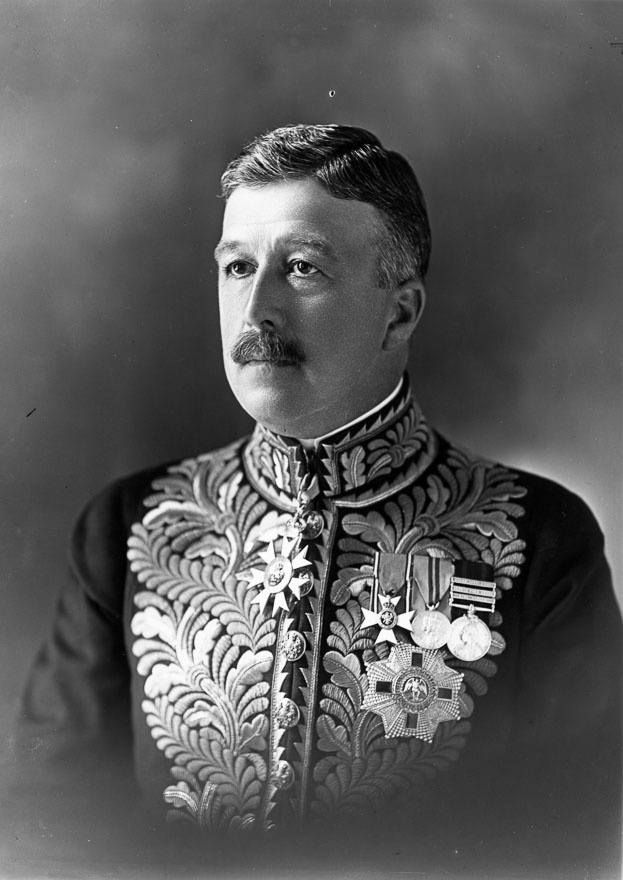

1st Governor-General of New Zealand
- In office 28 June 1917 – 8 July 1920
- Monarch: George V
- Prime Minister: William Massey
- Preceded by: Himself as Governor
- Succeeded by: The Viscount Jellicoe

16th Governor of New Zealand
- In office 19 December 1912 – 28 June 1917
- Monarch: George V
- Prime Minister: William Massey
- Preceded by: The Lord Islington
- Succeeded by: Himself as Governor-General

Personal details
- Born: 27 May 1870 Compton Place, Eastbourne, Sussex, England
- Died: 15 May 1941 (aged 70) Cranwick Hall, Lincoln, Lincolnshire, England
- Party: Liberal
- Spouse: Annette Monck (1875–1948)
- Education: Royal Military College, Sandhurst

Military service
- Allegiance: United Kingdom
- Branch/service: British Army
- Years of service: 1891–1907
- Rank: Major
- Unit: Rifle Brigade (The Prince Consort's Own)
- Battles/wars: Second Boer War

Arthur William de Brito Savile Foljambe, 2nd Earl of Liverpool (27 May 1870 – 15 May 1941), styled Viscount Hawkesbury between 1905 and 1907, was a British Liberal politician, the 16th and last Governor of New Zealand, and the first Governor-General of New Zealand.

== Background and education ==
Born at Compton Place, Eastbourne, Sussex, he was the eldest son and only surviving child of Cecil Foljambe, 1st Earl of Liverpool, by his first wife Louisa Howard, daughter of Frederick John Howard. He was educated at Eton College and the Royal Military College, Sandhurst before joining the Rifle Brigade.

== Military career ==
Foljambe was commissioned a second lieutenant in the Rifle Brigade on 2 May 1891, and was promoted to lieutenant on 14 February 1893 and to captain on 1 December 1897. He saw active service in the Second Boer War in South Africa. In July 1901 he was appointed an extra aide-de-camp to the Earl Cadogan, Lord Lieutenant of Ireland. He returned to his regiment in December 1901, joining the 4th battalion stationed in Bloemfontein. He retired from the army in 1907.

== Political career ==
Liverpool succeeded his father in the earldom in 1907 and took his seat in the House of Lords on the Liberal benches. In July 1909 he was appointed Comptroller of the Household in the Liberal administration of H. H. Asquith, a post he held until 1912, when he was appointed Governor of New Zealand. In 1917 the office was raised in rank to that of Governor-General of New Zealand. The same year Liverpool was also admitted to the Privy Council. His term was extended to cover the visit of the Prince of Wales. He retired as governor-general in 1920 and was appointed a Knight Grand Cross of the Order of the Bath on 7 October 1920.

During the First World War, Liverpool conferred his name upon a New Zealand infantry regiment. The New Zealand Rifle Brigade (Earl of Liverpool's Own) was formed in 1915, served with the New Zealand Division during the war and was disbanded in 1919.

== Family ==
Lord Liverpool married Annette Louise Monck, daughter of Henry Monck, 5th Viscount Monck, in 1897. They had no children. In the 1918 New Year Honours, Annette, Countess of Liverpool, was appointed a Dame Grand Cross of the Order of the British Empire. Lord Liverpool owned Hartsholme Hall, Lincoln, England, from 1909 to 1939.

He died at his home Canwick Hall, Lincolnshire, in May 1941, aged 70, and was succeeded in his titles by his half-brother, Gerald Foljambe.

== Arms ==
Coat of arms of Arthur William de Brito Savile Foljambe, 2nd Earl of Liverpool
Notes The arms of Arthur Foljambe, 2nd Earl of Liverpool consist of: (carved depiction) Crest Centre: On a Chapeau Gules, turned up Ermine, a Lion rampant Gules, charged on the shoulder with a Besant, thereon an Eagle displayed Sable, and resting the dexter hind paw on a Plate, charged with a Bend Azure, thereon three Garbs Or, and surmounted by an Escutcheon Argent, charged with an Eagle displayed Sable, charged on the breast with a Fleur-de-lis Or, the Lion crowned gold, and supporting with the forepaws a Man-of-War's Church Pennant proper (Honourable Augmentation). Dexter: a Seaweed Rock proper, thereon a Heraldic Sea-Lion sejant Azure, resting the dexter paw on an Escutcheon per Fess wavy Argent and Azure, in chief a Cormorant Sable, beaked and legged Gules, holding in the beak a Branch of Seaweed (called laver) inverted Vert, and in base a Hawk, wings elevated and addorsed Argent. Sinister: a Man's Leg unarmed excepting the Sper, couped at the thigh, quarterly Or and Sable, spurred Gold. Escutcheon Sable a Bend between six Escallops Or, and as an honourable augmentation (granted Aug 1906) on the bend in chief on an Escutcheon Vert a Key surmounted by a Baton in saltire Or. Supporters On either side, a Griffin, wings elevated Or, beaked, membered, ducally gorged, and on the wing three Fleurs-de-lis, one and two, all Azure, the dexter charged on the breast with a Torteau, thereon a Cross-Crosslet fitchée Argent (Badge of Howard); and the sinister charged on the breast with a Pellet, thereon a Stag's Head caboshed Argent (Badge of Cavendish). Motto Over centre crest: Bydd ddiysgog (Be steadfast); Over dexter crest: Demoures ferme (Be fast); Over sinister crest: Bee fast; Under the arms: Soyes ferme (Be steadfast)

Political offices
Preceded by The Master of Elibank	Comptroller of the Household; 1909–1912	Succeeded by The Lord Saye and Sele
Government offices
Preceded by The Lord Islington	Governor of New Zealand; 1912–1917	Office renamed
Office renamed	Governor-General of New Zealand; 1917–1920	Succeeded by The Viscount Jellicoe
Peerage of the United Kingdom
Preceded by Cecil Foljambe	Earl of Liverpool; 2nd creation 1907–1941	Succeeded by Gerald Foljambe
