= Julia Evelyn =

Julia Shuckburgh-Evelyn Lady Shuckburgh
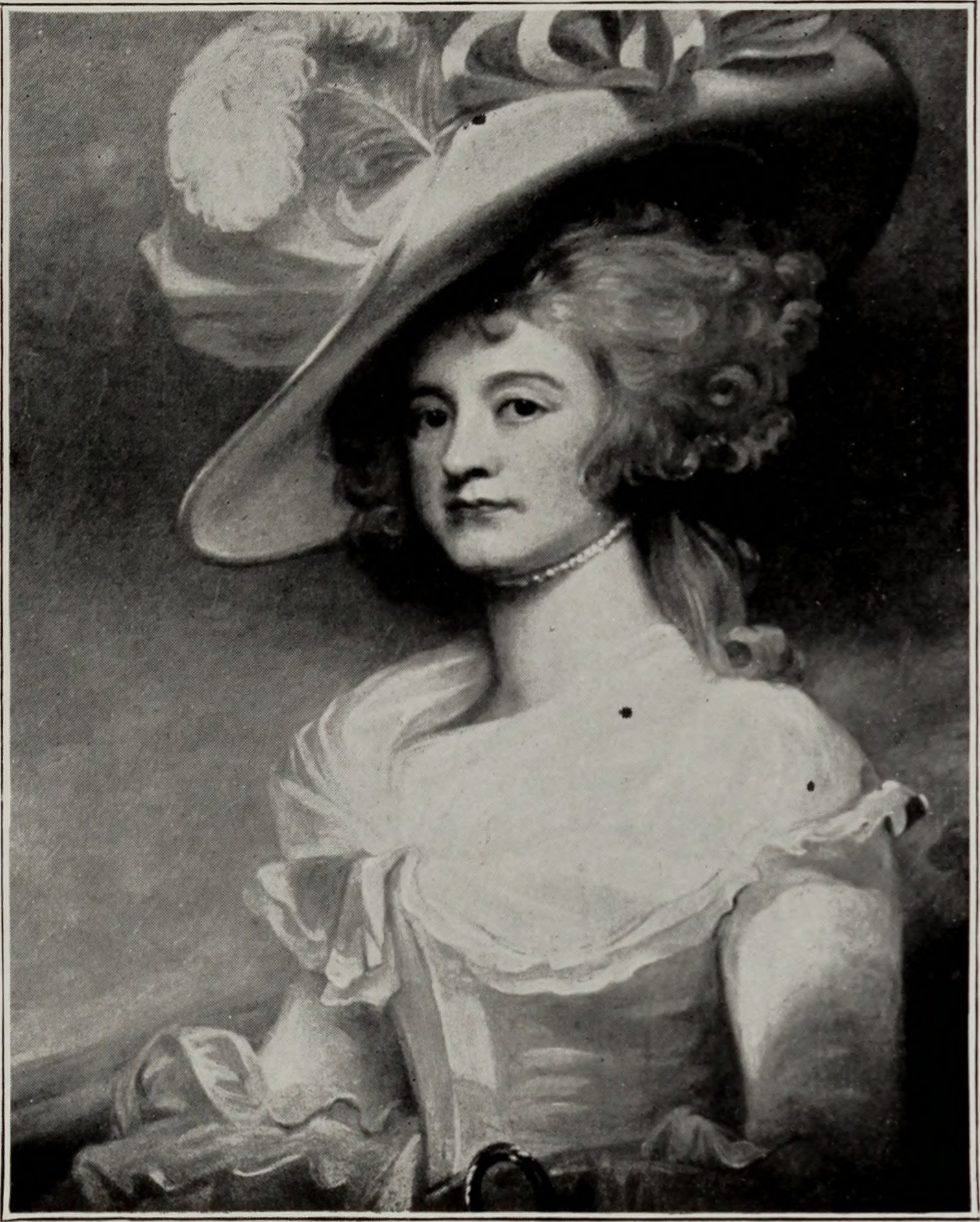
- Born: Julia Annabella Evelyn; 1757
- Died: 14 September 1797 (aged 39–40)
- Burial place: Church of St John the Baptist, Shuckburgh
- Spouse: George Shuckburgh-Evelyn
- Children: Julia Shuckburgh-Evelyn
- Parents: James Evelyn (father); Annabella Medley (mother)

Lady Julia Annabella Shuckburgh-Evelyn (née Evelyn; 1757 – 14 September 1797) was an English aristocrat and landowner.

== Biography ==
Julia Evelyn married into the Shuckburgh family as the daughter of James Evelyn (1718 –1793) and his first wife Annabella Medley (1718–1758). She was married to the Member of Parliament (MP) George Shuckburgh-Evelyn, and he adopted her surname after the death of her father by a private act of Parliament, Shuckburgh's Name Act 1794 (34 Geo. 3. c. 45 Pr.). She was a distant relative of the diarist John Evelyn, whose closer line of inheritance had died out. Lady Shuckburgh was painted by George Romney after her marriage.

Her daughter Julia Shuckburgh-Evelyn, the Countess of Liverpool, was married to Charles Jenkinson. Her half-sister Ann Evelyn died in 1791 aged 24 when her gown caught fire.
