= William James Clement =

English surgeon and politician (1802–1870)

William James Clement (1802 – 29 August 1870) was an English surgeon and a Liberal Party politician who was active in local government and sat in the House of Commons from 1865 to 1870.

== Life ==
Clement was the son of William Clement who was a medical practitioner in Shrewsbury for over sixty years. He was educated at Shrewsbury School and at the University of Edinburgh.

He was an Honorary Fellow of the Royal College of Surgeons, a Fellow of the Society of Apothecaries, surgeon to the 1st battalion of the Shropshire Rifle Volunteers, and in actual practice as a surgeon. He authored Observations in Surgery and Pathology and in 1834 was awarded the Fothergillian Gold Medal of the Medical Society of London. In writing An Account of Two Cases of Intestinal Obstruction, in which the operation for the formation of an artificial anus was performed; one in the ascending, the other in the descending colon he claimed to have been the first surgeon in Great Britain who successfully opened the ascending colon for intestinal obstruction.

He was an Alderman, Mayor of Shrewsbury for 1861–62, a Deputy Lieutenant and J.P. for Merionethshire and a J.P. for Shrewsbury borough. At the 1865 general election Clement was elected Member of Parliament for Shrewsbury. He held the seat until his death aged 68 in 1870. He was buried at the General Cemetery in Longden Road, Shrewsbury.

Clement married Tryphosa Freme, daughter of W. P. Freme of Wepre Hall, Flintshire in 1845.

== Commemorations ==
In 1873 a memorial drinking fountain and obelisk was erected to his memory in the forecourt of Shrewsbury railway station where it stood until 1897 when it was moved to The Quarry park in the Shrewsbury town centre.

In the parish church of Stanton Lacy, Shropshire, Clement is portrayed in the west window of the chancel, which is a memorial to Dr Joseph Bowles, its vicar until the latter's death in 1879. Bowles is portrayed as St Peter, while Clement, a personal friend of Bowles, appears as St Paul. Both faces were taken from life.

Parliament of the United Kingdom
Preceded by Henry Robertson; George Tomline	Member of Parliament for Shrewsbury; 1865–1870; With: George Tomline; James Figgins	Succeeded by Douglas Straight; James Figgins
