= Catherine Jenkinson =

- Born: 23 July 1811
- Died: 5 February 1887 (aged 75)
- Spouse: Francis Venables-Vernon-Harcourt
- Parents: Charles Jenkinson, 3rd Earl of Liverpool (father); Julia Shuckburgh-Evelyn (mother)

Lady Catherine Julia Vernon-Harcourt (née Jenkinson; 23 July 1811 – 5 December 1877) was a British noblewoman. She was a niece of Robert Jenkinson, 2nd Earl of Liverpool, who served as prime minister from 1812 to 1827.

== Biography ==
Lady Catherine Jenkinson was born into the Jenkinson family as a daughter of Charles Jenkinson, 3rd Earl of Liverpool and his wife Julia Shuckburgh-Evelyn. She had two younger sisters Louisa and Selina. She inherited the Buxted estate. She was married to Member of Parliament (MP) for Isle of Wight Colonel Francis Venables-Vernon-Harcourt.
