= Francis Venables-Vernon-Harcourt =

British politician and courtier

Member of Parliament for Isle of Wight
- In office 7 July 1852 – 27 March 1857

Personal details
- Born: 6 January 1801
- Died: 23 April 1880 (aged 79)
- Party: Conservative
- Spouse: Catherine Jenkinson (m. 1837)
- Parent: Edward Venables-Vernon-Harcourt (father)

Colonel Francis Venables-Vernon-Harcourt (6 January 1801 – 23 April 1880) was a British Conservative Party politician and courtier.

== Background ==
Venables-Vernon-Harcourt was the ninth son of the Most Reverend Edward Venables-Vernon-Harcourt, Archbishop of York, who in turn was the third son of George Venables-Vernon, 1st Baron Vernon. His mother was Lady Anne, daughter of Granville Leveson-Gower, 1st Marquess of Stafford. William Vernon Harcourt, Granville Harcourt-Vernon and Octavius Vernon Harcourt were his brothers.

== Career ==
He served as an equerry to Queen Victoria's mother, the Duchess of Kent. Venables-Vernon-Harcourt was elected at the 1852 general election as the Member of Parliament (MP) for the Isle of Wight, but did not stand again at the 1857 general election.

== Family ==
Venables-Vernon-Harcourt married Lady Catherine Julia, daughter of Charles Jenkinson, 3rd Earl of Liverpool, in 1837. She died in December 1877, aged 66. Venables-Vernon-Harcourt survived her by three years and died in April 1880, aged 79.

== Sources ==
Parliament of the United Kingdom
Preceded by Edward Dawes	Member of Parliament for the Isle of Wight; 1852–1857	Succeeded by Charles Clifford
