= John Cotes (died 1874) =

English politician

Member of Parliament for North Shropshire
- In office 10 December 1832 – 6 January 1835

Personal details
- Party: Whig
- Spouse: Lady Louisa Jenkinson
- Relations: Robert Jenkinson (uncle-in-law)
- Children: 6 (including Charles Cecil Cotes)
- Parent: John Cotes (father)

John Cotes (1799 – 1874) was an English politician who was Whig Member of Parliament (MP) for North Shropshire, at the time a two-member constituency, from the general election of 1832 to 1835. His father was John Cotes (died 1821), also an MP, and his son was Charles Cecil Cotes, who also became an MP. He is significant as the last non-Conservative MP for the constituency until the 2021 North Shropshire by-election.

== Sources ==
- brief mention in biography of his father
