= Lady Louisa Jenkinson =

Louisa Jenkinson
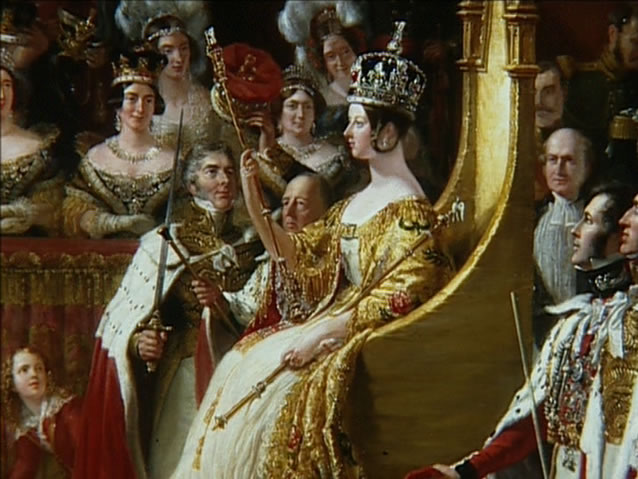
- Louisa Jenkinson at the Coronation in 1838
- Born: 28 March 1814
- Died: 5 February 1887 (aged 72); Pitchford Hall, Shropshire
- Spouse: John Cotes
- Children: 6
- Parents: Charles Jenkinson, 3rd Earl of Liverpool (father); Julia Shuckburgh-Evelyn (mother)

Lady Louisa Harriet Cotes (née Jenkinson; 28 March 1814 – 5 February 1887) was a British noblewoman. She was the niece of Robert Jenkinson, 2nd Earl of Liverpool, who served as prime minister from 1812 to 1827

== Biography ==
Lady Louisa Jenkinson was born into the Jenkinson family as a daughter of Charles Jenkinson, 3rd Earl of Liverpool and his wife Julia Shuckburgh-Evelyn. She had two older sisters Catherine and Selina. Jenkinson married John Cotes (1799–1874), the Whig Member of Parliament (MP) for North Shropshire. Jenkinson attended at the Coronation of Queen Victoria. She and her husband inherited Pitchford Hall in Shropshire. She died at Pitchford Hall, aged 72. There is a monument to the memory of John Cotes and Lady Louisa at St Peter's Church, Woodcote.

== Issue ==
She and her husband had six children

- Victoria Alexandrina Cotes (1840–1918), who married Thomas Owen and Robert Grant. Had issue.
- Catherine Maria Cotes (1842–1918), who married Orlando John George Bridgeman-Simpson (1838–1907). Had issue.
- Elizabeth Evelyn Cotes (died 1914), who married John Mordaunt. Had issue.
- Charles Cecil Cotes (1846–1898), member of parliament.
- Charles James Cotes (1848–1913)
- Selina Charlotte Cotes (1849–1903)
