= Edward Vernon (Australian cricketer) =

Australian cricketer (1911–1968)

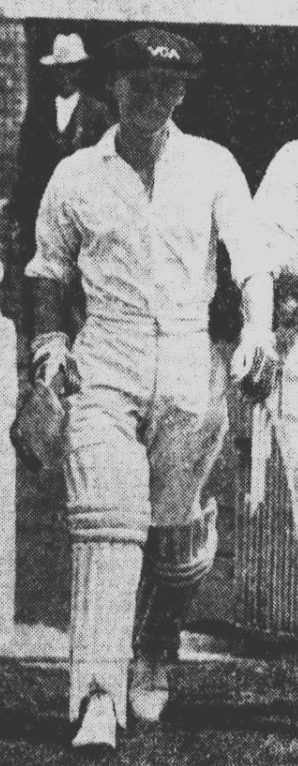

Personal information
- Born: 11 October 1911; Melbourne, Australia
- Died: 8 May 1968 (aged 56); Melbourne, Australia

Domestic team information
- Years: Team
- 1933-1936: Victoria
- Source: Cricinfo, 22 November 2015

Edward Vernon (11 October 1911 – 8 May 1968) was an Australian cricketer. He played ten first-class cricket matches for Victoria between 1933 and 1936.

== See also ==
- List of Victoria first-class cricketers
