= Magné, Vienne =

Magné
- Commune
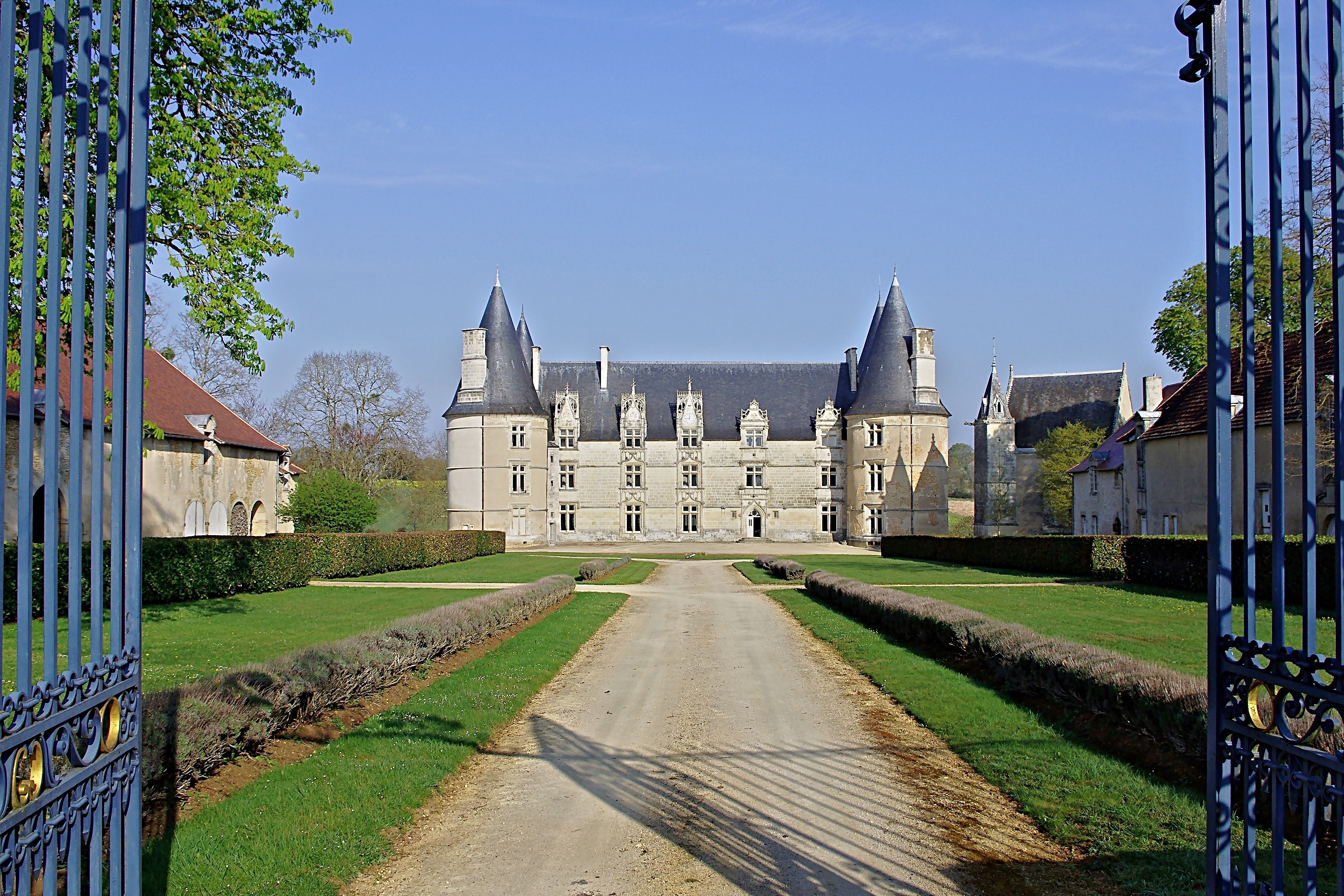
- The Château of La Roche-Gençay, in Magné
- Location of Magné
- Location within France Location within Nouvelle-Aquitaine
- Coordinates: 46°21′28″N 0°23′37″E
- Country: France
- Region: Nouvelle-Aquitaine
- Department: Vienne
- Arrondissement: Montmorillon
- Canton: Civray
- Intercommunality: Civraisien en Poitou

Government
  - Mayor (2020–2026): Murielle Phelippon
- Area^{1}: 20.01 km^{2} (7.73 sq mi)
- Elevation: 120 m (390 ft)
- Highest elevation: 144 m (472 ft)
- Lowest elevation: 109 m (358 ft)
- Population (2023): 672
  - Density: 33.6/km^{2} (87.0/sq mi)
- Time zone: UTC+01:00 (CET)
  - Summer (DST): UTC+02:00 (CEST)
- INSEE/Postal code: 86141 /86160
- ^{1} French Land Register data, which excludes lakes, ponds, glaciers > 1 km^{2} (0.386 sq mi or 247 acres) and river estuaries.

Magné (French pronunciation: [maɲe]) is a commune in the Vienne department in the Nouvelle-Aquitaine region in western France.

== See also ==
- Communes of the Vienne department
