= Edward Vernon (New Zealand cricketer) =

New Zealand cricketer

Personal information
- Full name: Edward Saunderson Vernon
- Born: 6 March 1851; Dublin, Ireland
- Died: 27 June 1902 (aged 51); At sea
- Batting: Right-handed

Domestic team information
- Years: Team
- 1878/79–1879/80: Otago
- Source: Cricinfo, 26 May 2016

Edward Saunderson Vernon (6 March 1851 – 27 June 1902) was a New Zealand cricketer. He played two first-class matches for Otago, one in each of the 1878–79 and 1879–80 seasons.

Vernon was born at Dublin in Ireland in 1851 and educated at Marlborough College in England and Christ's College in New Zealand. He was in the Marlborough cricket XI in 1867 and 1868. He was the son of John Vernon, a wealthy landowner and member of the Irish Land Commission who lived at Erne Hll in County Cavan.

Both of Vernon's first-class matches were played against Canterbury; he scored a total of 22 runs and did not take a wicket in them. He also played for Otago sides against touring English teams in January 1881 and January 1882 and for Southland against the touring Tasmanian side in February 1884.

Vernon worked as a merchant. He lived at Fortrose in Southland and at Christchurch and died on board ship in 1902 aged 51.
