= Cecil Foljambe, 1st Earl of Liverpool =

British Liberal politician (1846–1907)

The Right Honourable The Earl of Liverpool PC
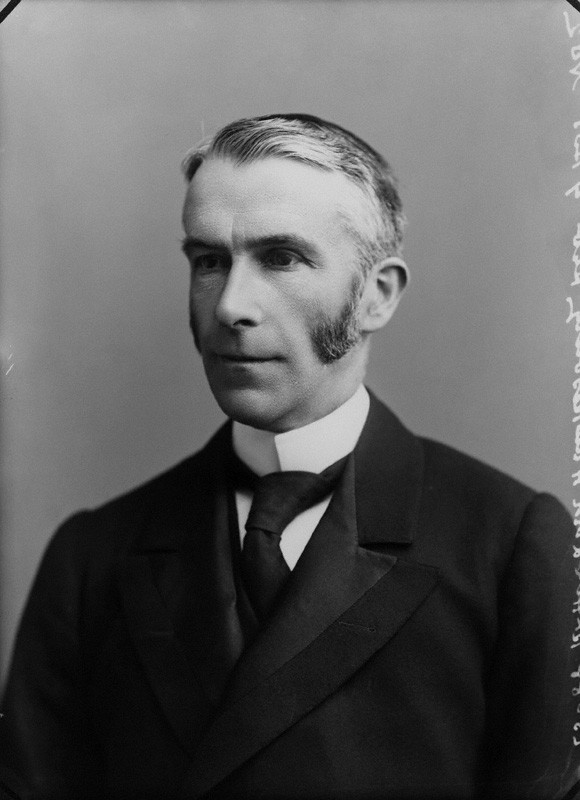

Lord Steward of the Household
- In office 18 December 1905 – 23 March 1907
- Monarch: Edward VII
- Prime Minister: Sir Henry Campbell-Bannerman
- Preceded by: The Earl of Pembroke
- Succeeded by: The Earl Beauchamp

Member of Parliament for Mansfield
- In office 18 December 1885 – 26 July 1892
- Preceded by: Constituency created
- Succeeded by: John Williams

Member of Parliament for North Nottinghamshire
- In office 27 April 1880 – 18 December 1885
- Preceded by: Sir Evelyn Denison
- Succeeded by: Constituency abolished

Personal details
- Born: 7 November 1846 Worksop, Nottinghamshire
- Died: 23 March 1907 (aged 60) Kirkham, East Riding of Yorkshire
- Party: Liberal
- Spouse(s): (1) Louisa Howard (d. 1871) (2) Susan Cavendish (d. 1917)

Cecil George Savile Foljambe, 1st Earl of Liverpool, PC (7 November 1846 – 23 March 1907), known as the Lord Hawkesbury between 1893 and 1905, was a British Liberal politician. A great-nephew of Prime Minister Robert Jenkinson, 2nd Earl of Liverpool, he was Lord Steward of the Household under Sir Henry Campbell-Bannerman between 1905 and his death in 1907. He was the grandson of Sir Cecil Bishopp, 6th Baronet of Parham, his namesake. Foljambe was a noted ornithologist and was once visited by a young Franklin D. Roosevelt who made a trip specifically to see Foljambe's collection.

== Background ==
Foljambe was born at Osberton Hall in Worksop, Nottinghamshire. He was the son of George Savile Foljambe and Lady Selina Jenkinson, daughter of Charles Jenkinson, 3rd Earl of Liverpool. Prime Minister Robert Jenkinson, 2nd Earl of Liverpool, was his great-uncle, and his older half-brother was Francis Foljambe, a fellow Liberal politician.

He joined the Royal Navy and served as a midshipman 1861–67 then lieutenant 1867–70, in England, and in New Zealand during the Waikato War in 1863–64. He kept his own hand-written logs of his voyages, which include numerous colour and black and white sketches. His postings included HMS Victory (1861–1862), HMS Defence (1862–1863), HMS Curacoa (1863–1867), HM Gunboat Pioneer (1863), HM Steamer Avon (1863–1864), and HM Colonial Steamer Koheroa (1864).

During 1863, he completed a running survey of the Waikato River between Ngāruawāhia and Huntly when a fellow shipmate was wounded. He was promoted to lieutenant on 8 June 1867, and retired from the navy on 2 May 1870.

== Political career ==
In 1880, Foljambe was elected to the House of Commons for North Nottinghamshire. He held this seat until 1885, and then represented Mansfield from 1885 to 1892.

In 1893, he was raised to the peerage as Baron Hawkesbury, of Haselbech in the County of Northampton and of Ollerton, Sherwood Forest, in the County of Nottingham, a revival of the barony held by his maternal grandfather, Lord Liverpool. In 1894, he was appointed a Lord-in-waiting (government whip in the House of Lords) in the Liberal administration of Lord Rosebery, a post he held until the government fell in 1895.

In July 1901, he was appointed an additional member of the Royal Commission on Historical Manuscripts.

When the Liberals returned to power in 1905 under Sir Henry Campbell-Bannerman, Hawkesbury was made Lord Steward of the Household. A few days later the earldom of Liverpool was also revived when he was made Viscount Hawkesbury, of Kirkham in the County of York and of Mansfield in the County of Nottingham, and Earl of Liverpool. He was admitted to the Privy Council in 1906 and remained a member of the government until his death in March 1907.

== Family ==
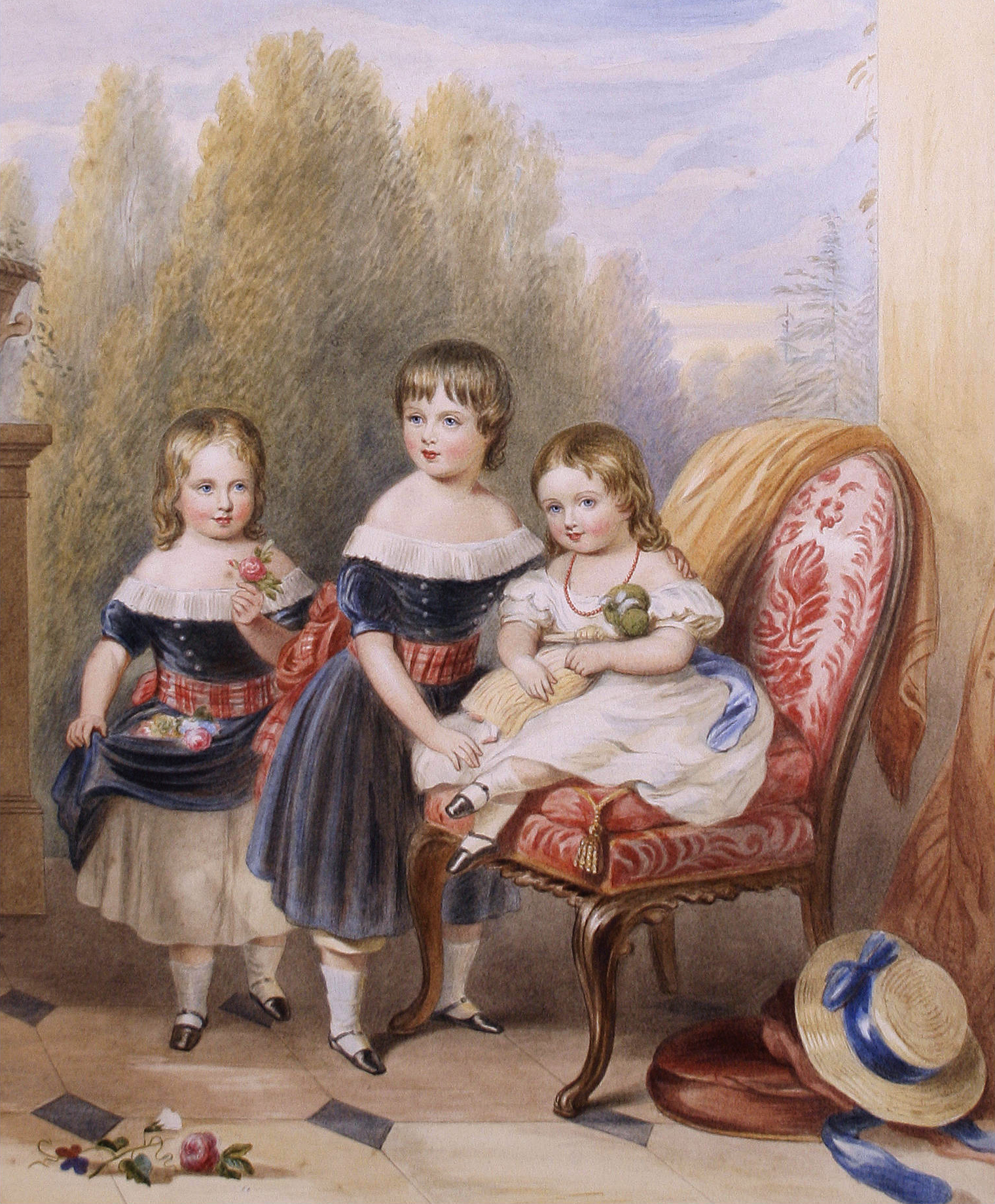
Louisa (Foljambe) Howard (seated) with her elder brothers William and George Robert Dowling, 1844)

Lord Liverpool married Louisa Howard, daughter of Frederick John Howard, on 22 July 1869. They had two children:

- Arthur William de Brito Savile Foljambe, 2nd Earl of Liverpool (27 May 1870 – 15 May 1941)
- Frederick Compton Savile Foljambe (20 August 1871 – 21 August 1871), died in infancy.

After his first wife's death in 1871, Foljambe erected memorial plaques and windows in 38 churches which had connections with the family, e.g. Sherburn-in-Elmet church where there is a "Foljambe window".

On 21 July 1877, Foljambe married his first wife's cousin, Susan Cavendish, daughter of William Frederick Henry Cavendish. They had eleven children:

- Gerald William Frederick Savile Foljambe, 3rd Earl of Liverpool (1878–1962), an officer in the Oxfordshire Light Infantry.
- Lady Edith Margaret Emily Mary Foljambe (1879–1962), married Brigadier-General D'Arcy Legard.
- Lady Alice Etheldreda Georgiana Mary Foljambe (1880–1922), a painter, died unmarried.
- Lady Mabel Evelyn Selina Mary Foljambe (1881–1915), married Dr. William Woodburn.
- Brevet Major Honourable Josceline Charles William Savile Foljambe (1882–1916), an officer in the Northumberland Fusiliers, killed in action in the First World War.
- Margaret Susan Louisa Mary Foljambe (14 January 1884 – 16 January 1884), died in infancy.
- Lady Constance Blanche Alethea Mary Foljambe (1885–1977), married Reverend Hezekiah Hawkins.
- Robert Anthony Edward St Andrew Savile Foljambe, 4th Earl of Liverpool (1887–1969)
- Honourable Bertram Marmaduke Osbert Savile Foljambe (1891–1955), married Joyce Edmunson and had issue, including Captain Peter George William Savile Foljambe (1919–1944), whose son Edward Foljambe (b.1944) is the present Earl of Liverpool.
- Lady Rosamond Sylvia Diana Mary Foljambe (1893–12 April 1974), married Archibald Leslie-Melville, 13th Earl of Leven, and had issue.
- Honourable Victor Alexander Cecil Savile Foljambe (1895–1975).

Foljambe died in March 1907, aged 60, and was succeeded in the earldom by his eldest and only surviving son from his first marriage, Arthur. The Countess of Liverpool died in December 1917.

Parliament of the United Kingdom
Preceded by Frederick Chatfield Smith; The Viscount Galway	Member of Parliament for North Nottinghamshire; 1880–1885; With: The Viscount Galway	Constituency abolished
New constituency	Member of Parliament for Mansfield; 1885–1892	Succeeded by John Williams
Political offices
Preceded by The Earl of Pembroke	Lord Steward of the Household; 1905–1907	Succeeded by The Earl Beauchamp
Peerage of the United Kingdom
New creation	Earl of Liverpool; 2nd creation 1905–1907	Succeeded by Arthur Foljambe
New creation	Baron Hawkesbury; 2nd creation 1893–1907	Succeeded by Arthur Foljambe
Professional and academic associations
Preceded by George Pearson	President of the Lancashire and Cheshire Antiquarian Society; 1906–07	Succeeded by Henry Thomas Crofton
