= Earl of Liverpool =

Title in the Peerage of Great Britain

- Blazon Arms: Sable a Bend between six Escallops Or, and as an honourable augmentation (granted Aug 1906) on the bend in chief on an Escutcheon Vert a Key surmounted by a Baton in saltire Or. Crests: Centre: On a Chapeau Gules, turned up Ermine, a Lion rampant Gules, charged on the shoulder with a Bezant, thereon an Eagle displayed Sable, and resting the dexter hind paw on a Plate, charged with a Bend Azure, thereon three Garbs Or, and surmounted by an Escutcheon Argent, charged with an Eagle displayed Sable, charged on the breast with a Fleur-de-lis Or, the Lion crowned gold, and supporting with the forepaws a Man-of War's Church Pennant proper (Honourable Augmentation). Dexter: a Seaweed Rock proper, thereon a Heraldic Sea-Lion sejant Azure, resting the dexter paw on an Escutcheon per Fess wavy Argent and Azure, in chief a Cormorant Sable, beaked and legged Gules, holding in the beak a Branch of Seaweed (called laver) inverted Vert, and in base a Hawk, wings elevated and addorsed Argent. Sinister: a Man's Leg unarmed excepting the Sper, couped at the thigh, quarterly Or and Sable, spurred Gold. Supporters: On either side, a Griffin, wings elevated Or, beaked, membered, ducally gorged, and on the wing three Fleurs-de-lis, one and two, all Azure, the dexter charged on the breast with a Torteau, thereon a Cross-Crosslet fitchée Argent (Badge of Howard); and the sinister charged on the breast with a Pellet, thereon a Stag's Head caboshed Argent (Badge of Cavendish).
- Creation date: 22 December 1905
- Creation: Second
- Created by: King Edward VII
- Peerage: Peerage of the United Kingdom
- Present holder: Edward Foljambe, 5th Earl of Liverpool
- Heir apparent: Luke Foljambe, Viscount Hawkesbury
- Remainder to: Heirs male of the body, lawfully begotten
- Subsidiary titles: Viscount Hawkesbury; Baron Hawkesbury
- Status: Extant
- Motto: Over centre crest: BYDD DDIYS GOG (Be steadfast); Over dexter crest: DEMOVRES FERME (Be fast); Over sinister crest: BEE FAST; Under the arms: Soyes ferme (Be steadfast)

Earl of Liverpool is a title that has been created twice in British history. The first time was in the Peerage of Great Britain in 1796 for Charles Jenkinson, 1st Baron Hawkesbury, a favourite of King George III (see Jenkinson baronets for earlier history of the family). He had already been made Baron Hawkesbury, of Hawkesbury in the County of Gloucester, in 1786, and had succeeded as seventh Baronet of Walcot and Hawkesbury in 1790. His eldest son, the second Earl, served as Prime Minister of the United Kingdom from 1812 to 1827. The peerages became extinct in 1851 on the death of the latter's half-brother, the third Earl, while the baronetcy was inherited by a cousin (see Jenkinson baronets).

The earldom was revived in 1905 in favour of the Liberal politician Cecil Foljambe, 1st Baron Hawkesbury, son of George Foljambe and his second wife Lady Selina Charlotte Jenkinson, daughter of the third Earl of the first creation. He was made Viscount Hawkesbury, of Kirkham in the County of York and of Mansfield in the County of Nottingham, at the same time, and had already been created Baron Hawkesbury, of Haselbech in the County of Northampton and of Ollerton, Sherwood Forest, in the County of Nottingham, in 1893. His eldest son, the second Earl, served as Governor-General of New Zealand between 1912 and 1920. As of 2019, the titles are held by the latter's great-nephew, the fifth Earl, who succeeded his great-uncle, the fifth son of the first Earl, in 1969. He is the posthumous son of Captain Peter George William Savile Foljambe (1919–1944), who was killed in action in the Second World War, son of the Hon. Bertram Marmaduke Osbert Savile Foljambe (1891–1955), sixth son of the first Earl. Lord Liverpool is one of the ninety elected hereditary peers that remain in the House of Lords after the passing of the House of Lords Act 1999, and sits on the Conservative benches.

== Family estate and North Yorkshire roles ==
The 4th Earl was Inspector of Driffield Division of the police's East Riding Special Constabulary, 1926–1945. He was returned by the people to Norton Rural District in Yorkshire from 1927 to 1947. He had his main home published as Inverey, 11 West Park Road, Cupar, Fife, Scotland.

== Earl of Liverpool, first creation ==
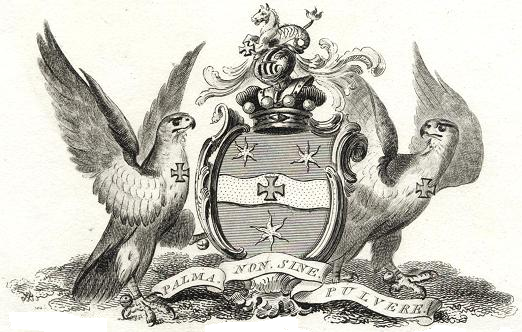
Arms of the Earls of Liverpool (1st creation).

=== Baron Hawkesbury, first creation (1786) ===
- Charles Jenkinson, 1st Baron Hawkesbury (1729–1808) (created Earl of Liverpool in 1796)

=== Earl of Liverpool (1796) ===
- Charles Jenkinson, 1st Earl of Liverpool (1729–1808)
- Robert Banks Jenkinson, 2nd Earl of Liverpool (1770–1828)
- Charles Cecil Cope Jenkinson, 3rd Earl of Liverpool (1784–1851)

== Earl of Liverpool, second creation ==
=== Baron Hawkesbury, second creation (1893) ===
- Cecil George Savile Foljambe, 1st Baron Hawkesbury (1846–1907) (created Earl of Liverpool in 1905)

=== Earl of Liverpool (1905) ===
- Cecil George Savile Foljambe, 1st Earl of Liverpool (1846–1907)
- Arthur William de Brito Savile Foljambe, 2nd Earl of Liverpool (1870–1941)
- Gerald William Frederick Savile Foljambe, 3rd Earl of Liverpool (1878–1962)
- Robert Anthony Edward St Andrew Savile Foljambe, 4th Earl of Liverpool (1887–1969)
- Edward Peter Bertram Savile Foljambe, 5th Earl of Liverpool (b. 1944)

The heir apparent is the present holder's son, Luke Marmaduke Peter Savile Foljambe, Viscount Hawkesbury (b. 1972).
The heir apparent's heir apparent is his son, Hon. Charles Marmaduke Foljambe (b. 2019).

== Title succession chart ==
Title succession chart, Barons Hawkesbury, Viscounts Hawkesbury, and Earls of Liverpool (both creations).

Baron Hawkesbury; Viscount Hawkesbury; Earl of Liverpool (first creation)
Charles Jenkinson; 1st Earl of Liverpool; 1729–1808
Robert Jenkinson; 2nd Earl of Liverpool; 1770–1828; Prime Minister of the United Kingdom; 1812–1827	Charles Jenkinson; 3rd Earl of Liverpool; 1784–1851
Barony, viscountcy and earldom extinct
George Foljambe; 1800–1869	Lady Selina Jenkinson; 1812–1883
Baron Hawkesbury; Viscount Hawkesbury; Earl of Liverpool (second creation)
Cecil Foljambe; 1st Earl of Liverpool; 1846–1907
Arthur Foljambe; 2nd Earl of Liverpool; 1870–1941	Frederick Foljambe; 1871–1871	Gerald Foljambe; 3rd Earl of Liverpool; 1878–1962	Maj. Hon. Josceline Foljambe; 1882–1916	Robert Foljambe; 4th Earl of Liverpool; 1887–1969	Hon. Bertram Foljambe; 1891–1955
Capt. Peter Foljambe; 1919–1944
Edward Foljambe; 5th Earl of Liverpool born 1944
Luke Foljambe; Viscount Hawkesbury born 1972

=== Line of succession ===
Earls of Liverpool line of succession
- Edward Peter Bertram Savile Foljambe, 5th Earl of Liverpool (born 1944)
  - (1) Luke Marmaduke Peter Savile Foljambe, Viscount Hawkesbury (b. 1972)
    - (2) Hon. Charles Marmaduke Foljambe (b. 2019)
  - (3) Hon. Ralph Edward Anthony Savile Foljambe (b. 1974)
    - (4) Arthur Edward Peter Savile Foljambe (b. 2007)
    - (5) Hector George Jocelyn Savile Foljambe (b. 2009)

== See also ==
- Jenkinson baronets, of Walcot and Hawkesbury
