= Charles Jenkinson, 3rd Earl of Liverpool =

British politician (1784–1851)

The Right Honourable The Earl of Liverpool GCB PC
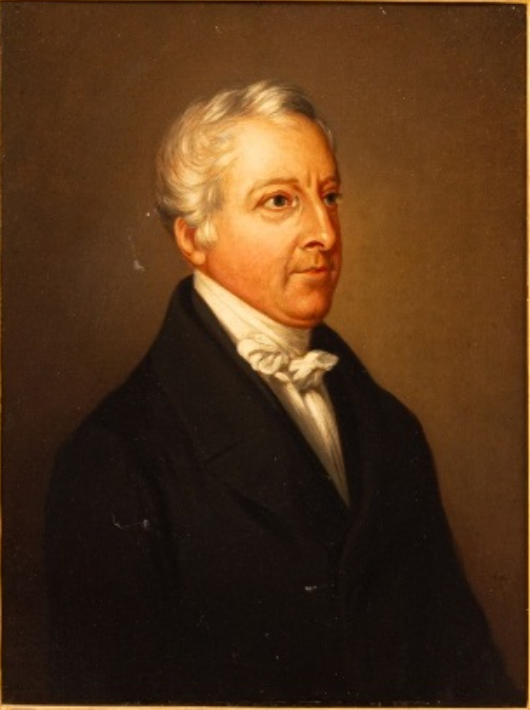
- portrait by Franz Xavier Winterhalter

Lord Steward of the Household
- In office 3 September 1841 – 29 June 1846
- Monarch: Queen Victoria
- Prime Minister: Robert Peel
- Preceded by: The Earl of Erroll
- Succeeded by: The Earl Fortescue

Under-Secretary of State for War and the Colonies
- In office 1809–1810 Serving with F.J. Robinson (1809); Sir Henry Bunbury (1809–1810)
- Monarch: George III
- Prime Minister: Spencer Perceval
- Preceded by: Edward Cooke; Charles Stewart
- Succeeded by: Henry Bunbury; Robert Peel

Under-Secretary of State for the Home Department
- In office November 1807 – February 1810
- Monarch: George III
- Prime Minister: The Duke of Portland; Spencer Perceval
- Preceded by: Charles Williams-Wynn
- Succeeded by: Henry Goulburn
Parliamentary offices
Member of the House of Lords
Hereditary peerage 4 December 1828 – 3 October 1851
Preceded by	Robert Jenkinson, 2nd Earl of Liverpool
Succeeded by	Cecil Foljambe, 1st Earl of Liverpool (1893)
Member of Parliament for East Grinstead
In office 4 August 1818 – 4 December 1828 Serving with Lord Strathavon
Preceded by	Sir George Gunning, 2nd Baronet
Succeeded by	Viscount Holmesdale
Member of Parliament for Bridgnorth
In office 24 November 1812 – 10 June 1818 Serving with Thomas Whitmore
Preceded by	Isaac Hawkins Browne
Succeeded by	Sir Thomas Tyrwhitt-Jones, 2nd Baronet
Member of Parliament for Sandwich
In office 22 June 1807 – 24 November 1812 Serving with Peter Rainier (1807–1808); John Spratt Rainier (1808–1812)
Preceded by	Sir Horatio Mann, 2nd Baronet
Succeeded by	Joseph Sydney Yorke

Personal details
- Born: 29 May 1784
- Died: 3 October 1851 (aged 67)
- Party: Tory
- Spouse(s): Julia Shuckburgh-Evelyn (m. 1810, d. 1814)
- Children: 3 (including Catherine, Selina & Louisa)
- Parent(s): Charles Jenkinson; Catherine Bishopp

Charles Cecil Cope Jenkinson, 3rd Earl of Liverpool GCB PC (29 May 1784 – 3 October 1851), styled The Honourable Charles Jenkinson between 1786 and 1828, was a British politician.

== Background ==
Liverpool was the son of Charles Jenkinson, 1st Earl of Liverpool, by his second wife Catherine, daughter of Sir Cecil Bishopp, 6th Baronet, and the younger half-brother of Prime Minister Robert Jenkinson, 2nd Earl of Liverpool. He was educated at Charterhouse School and Christ Church, Oxford.

Between school and university he was placed as a rating (at his father's insistence) in the Royal Navy until a mutiny in 1797 led to him fleeing his ship, HMS Pomone. During the Napoleonic Wars, he was a cornet in the Surrey Yeomanry in 1803 and later served as a volunteer in the Austrian Army at the Battle of Austerlitz in 1805. In 1810, he was lieutenant-colonel of the Cinque Ports militia.

In 1807, he inherited the Pitchford Hall estate in Shropshire following the death of Adam Ottley (the last of his family's male line).

== Political career ==
The Hon. Charles Jenkinson, as he was then, was elected Member of Parliament for Sandwich in 1807, a seat he held until 1812, and then sat for Bridgnorth from 1812 to 1818, and for East Grinstead from 1818 to 1828. He held office under the Duke of Portland as Under-Secretary of State for the Home Department from 1807 to 1809 and under Spencer Perceval as Under-Secretary of State for War and the Colonies from 1809 to 1810, but did not serve in his brother's 1812 to 1827 Tory administration. Liverpool succeeded in the earldom of Liverpool in 1828 on the death of his elder brother and took his seat in the House of Lords. In 1841 he was invested a member of the Privy Council and appointed Lord Steward of the Household in the government of Sir Robert Peel, a post he held until 1846. In 1845 he was made Knight Grand Cross of the Order of the Bath.

== Family ==
On 19 July 1810, Jenkinson married Julia Evelyn Medley Shuckburgh-Evelyn, daughter of Sir George Shuckburgh-Evelyn, 6th Baronet, and Julia Annabella Evelyn. The couple had had three daughters:

- Lady Catherine Julia Jenkinson (23 July 1811 – 5 December 1877); married Col. Francis Venables-Vernon-Harcourt, son of the Most Rev. Edward Venables-Vernon-Harcourt and Lady Anne Leveson-Gower; the couple had no children.
- Lady Selina Charlotte Jenkinson (3 July 1812 – 24 September 1883); married, firstly, on 15 August 1833, William Wentworth-Fitzwilliam, Viscount Milton (1812–1835), with whom she had one child: Hon. Mary Selina Charlotte Fitzwilliam (9 January 1836 – 4 January 1899), who later married Henry Portman, 2nd Viscount Portman. Lady Selina married, secondly, on 28 August 1845, as his second wife, George Savile Foljambe (4 June 1800 – 18 December 1869), with whom she had four children:
  - Cecil George Savile Foljambe (7 November 1846 – 23 March 1907); later the 1st Earl of Liverpool (of the 2nd creation).
  - Caroline Frederica Foljambe (died 20 October 1895).
  - Elizabeth Anne Foljambe (died 2 January 1930).
  - Frances Mary Foljambe (died 25 January 1921).
- Lady Louisa Harriet Jenkinson (28 March 1814 – 5 February 1887); married John Cotes, son of John Cotes and Lady Maria Grey, a daughter of George Grey, 5th Earl of Stamford; they had two sons.

Julia died in April 1814, shortly after the birth of their youngest child, Louisa. Jenkinson remained a widower until his death in October 1851, aged 67.

In 1828, he inherited the Jenkinson baronetcy, the barony of Hawkesbury and the earldom of Liverpool at the death of his older half-brother, the former prime minister. On his own death, the barony and the earldom became extinct, but the baronetcy (created in 1661) survived, and was passed on to a cousin.

The barony was revived in 1893 in favour of Liverpool's grandson, the Liberal politician Cecil Foljambe, the son of Liverpool's second daughter Lady Selina and her husband George Foljambe. In 1905, the earldom was also revived in favour of Lord Hawkesbury.

== Arms ==
Coat of arms of Charles Jenkinson, 3rd Earl of Liverpool
Crest A sea-horse assurgent argent, maned azure, supporting a cross patée gules. Escutcheon Azure, a fess wavy argent charged with a cross patée gules, in chief two estoiles or, and, as an honourable augmentation, upon a chief wavy of the second a cormorant sable beaked and legged of the third, holding in the beak a branch of sea-weed (called layer) inverted vert. Supporters Two hawks, wings elevated and endorsed, proper, beaked, legged and belled or, charged on the breast with a cross patée gules. Motto Palma non sine pulvere (No reward without effort). Orders The Most Honourable Order of the Bath - Knight Grand Cross (GCB).

Parliament of the United Kingdom
Preceded by Sir Horatio Mann, Bt; Thomas Fremantle	Member of Parliament for Sandwich; 1807–1812; With: Peter Rainier 1807–1808; John Spratt Rainier 1808–1812	Succeeded by Joseph Maryatt; Sir Joseph Sydney Yorke
Preceded by Isaac Hawkins Browne; Thomas Whitmore	Member of Parliament for Bridgnorth; 1812–1818; With: Thomas Whitmore	Succeeded by Thomas Whitmore; Sir Thomas John Tyrwhitt Jones
Preceded by George William Gunning; Lord Strathavon	Member of Parliament for East Grinstead; 1818–1828; With: Lord Strathavon	Succeeded by Lord Strathavon; Viscount Holmesdale
Political offices
Preceded by Charles Williams-Wynn	Under-Secretary of State for the Home Department; 1807–1809	Succeeded by Henry Goulburn
Preceded by Edward Cooke; Hon. Charles Stewart	Under-Secretary of State for War and the Colonies; 1809–1810; With: Hon. F. J. Robinson 1809; Henry Bunbury 1809–1810	Succeeded by Henry Bunbury; Robert Peel
Preceded by The Earl of Erroll	Lord Steward of the Household; 1841–1846	Succeeded by The Earl Fortescue
Peerage of Great Britain
Preceded by Robert Jenkinson	Earl of Liverpool; 1828–1851	Extinct
Baronetage of England
Preceded by Robert Jenkinson	Baronet (of Hawkesbury); 1828–1851	Succeeded by Charles Jenkinson
