= Cecil Bishopp =

Cecil Bishopp may refer to:

- Sir Cecil Bishopp, 4th Baronet (c.1635–1705), MP for Bramber
- Sir Cecil Bishopp, 5th Baronet (died 1725), of the Bishopp baronets
- Sir Cecil Bishopp, 6th Baronet (1700–1778), MP for Penryn
- Sir Cecil Bishopp, 7th Baronet (died 1779), of the Bishopp baronets
- Cecil Bisshopp, 12th Baron Zouche (1752–1828), of the Bishopp baronets, MP for New Shoreham, Baron Zouche
- Sir Cecil Bisshopp, 10th Baronet (1821–1849), of the Bishopp baronets

== See also ==
- Cecil Bishop (disambiguation)
- Bishopp (surname)
