= Catherine Bishopp =

British noblewoman (1744–1827)

The Right Honourable The Countess of Liverpool
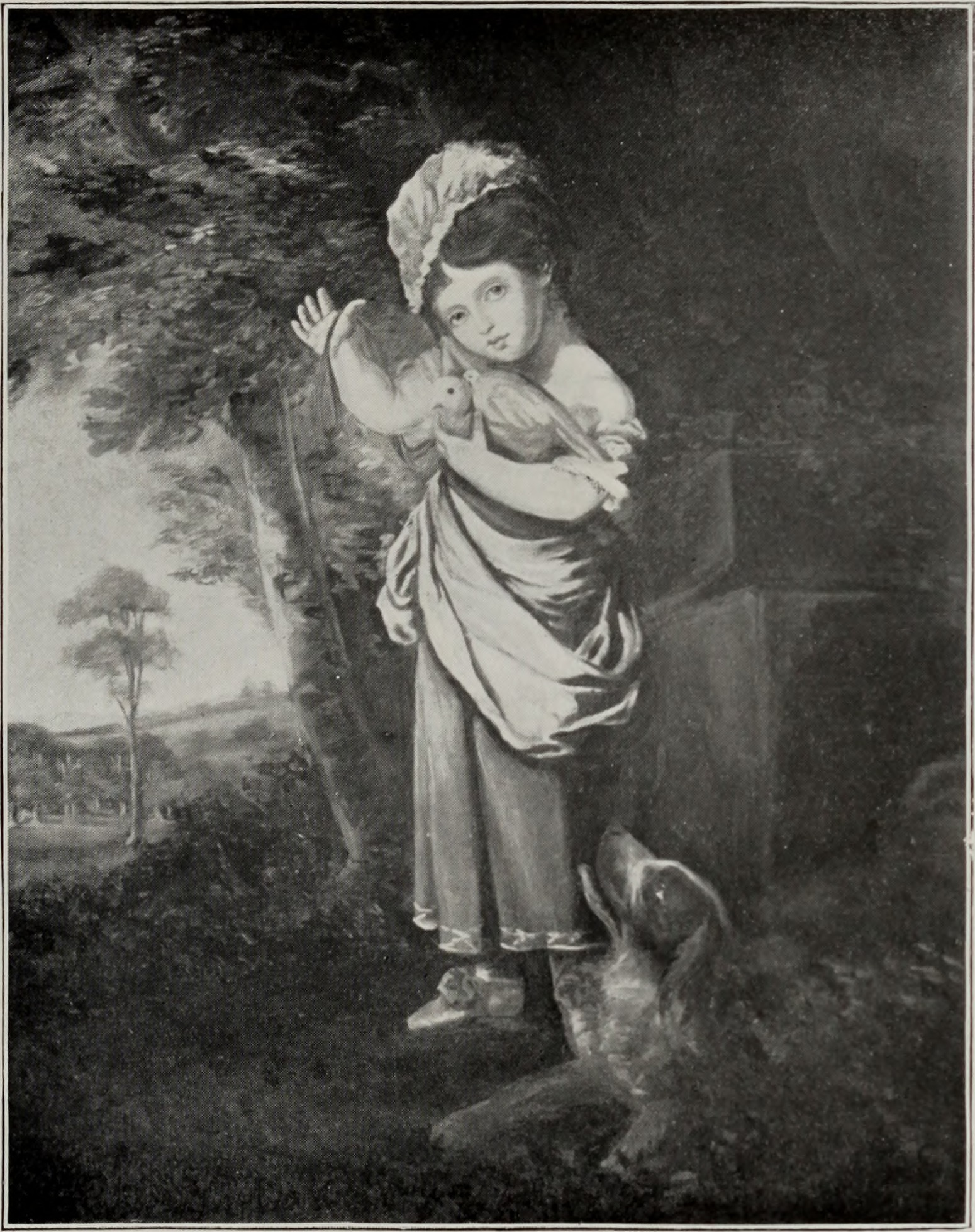
- Born: 30 November 1744
- Died: 1 October 1827 (aged 82)
- Spouses: Sir Charles Cope, 2nd Baronet (m. 1767); Charles Jenkinson, 1st Earl of Liverpool (m. 1782)
- Issue: 4 (including Arabella Diana Cope and Charles Jenkinson, 3rd Earl of Liverpool)
- Father: Sir Cecil Bishopp, 6th Baronet
- Mother: Anne Boscawen

Catherine Bishopp (30 November 1744 – 1 October 1827), also known by the titles Lady Cope and the Countess of Liverpool, was a British noblewoman. She was a daughter of Sir Cecil Bishopp, 6th Baronet. She was firstly married to Sir Charles Cope, 2nd Baronet. She was Countess of Liverpool as the second wife of Charles Jenkinson, 1st Earl of Liverpool and the mother of Charles Jenkinson, 3rd Earl of Liverpool. Through her second husband she was the step-mother of Robert Jenkinson, 2nd Earl of Liverpool who served as prime minister from 1812 to 1827.

== Biography ==
Catherine Bishopp was born into the Bishopp family as the fifth and youngest daughter of Sir Cecil Bishopp, 6th Baronet and his wife Anne Boscawen. Her mother was the daughter of Hugh Boscawen, 1st Viscount Falmouth.

In 1767, she married Sir Charles Cope, 2nd Baronet, the grandson of Sir Jonathan Cope, 1st Baronet, and was widowed in 1781. She had two daughters with her first husband. In 1782, she married Charles Jenkinson, 1st Earl of Liverpool, whose first wife Amelia had died in childbirth, giving birth to Robert. She then had another daughter and a son Charles.

Catherine Bishopp died in 1827.

== Issue ==
With her first husband Charles Cope:

- Arabella Diana Cope (1769–1829), was Duchess of Dorset by her first marriage to John Sackville, 3rd Duke of Dorset, and Countess of Whitworth by her second marriage to Charles Whitworth, 1st Earl Whitworth
- Catherine Cope (1771–1832), was Marchioness Huntly by marriage to George Gordon, 9th Marquess of Huntly

With her second husband Charles Jenkinson:

- Charlotte Jenkinson (1783–1863), married James Grimston, 1st Earl of Verulam
- Charles Jenkinson, 3rd Earl of Liverpool (1784–1851), married Julia Shuckburgh-Evelyn.
