= Jonathan Cope =

Jonathan Cope may refer to:

- Jonathan Cope (dancer) (born 1963), principal dancer with The Royal Ballet
- Jonathan Cope (MP for Stafford) (died 1694), MP for Stafford
- Sir Jonathan Cope, 1st Baronet (died 1765), MP for Banbury
- Sir Jonathan Cope, 4th Baronet (died 1821), of the Cope baronets

== See also ==
- Cope (surname)
- John Cope (disambiguation)
