= Charles Whitworth, 1st Earl Whitworth =

British diplomat (1752–1825)

The Right Honourable The Earl Whitworth GCB PC
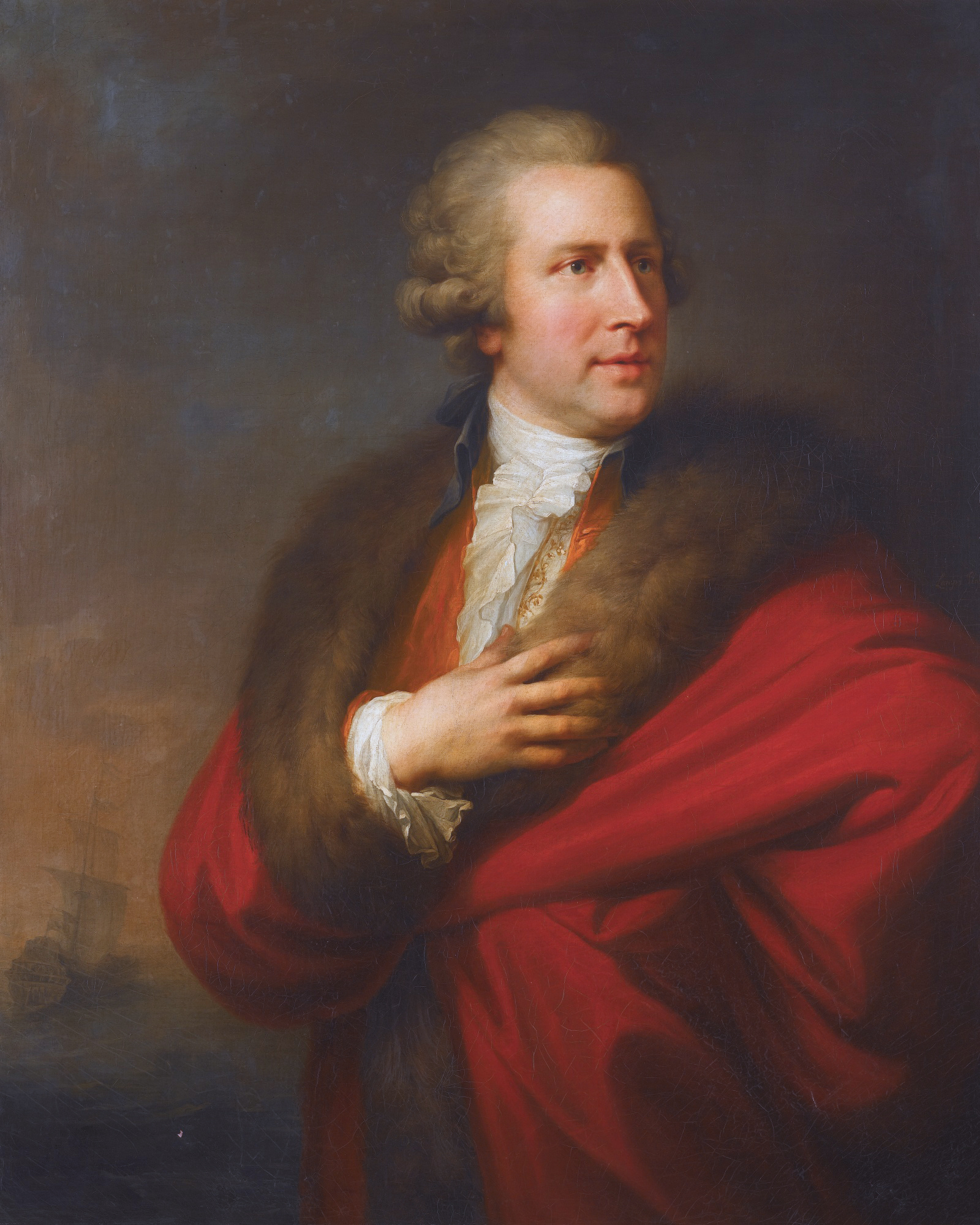
- Portrait by Johann Baptist von Lampi the Elder, 1789

Lord Lieutenant of Ireland
- In office 23 June 1813 – 3 October 1817
- Monarch: George III
- Preceded by: The Duke of Richmond
- Succeeded by: The Earl Talbot

Personal details
- Born: 29 May 1752
- Died: 13 May 1825 (aged 72)

Charles Whitworth, 1st Earl Whitworth (29 May 1752 – 13 May 1825), known as Lord Whitworth between 1800 and 1813 and as Viscount Whitworth between 1813 and 1815, was a British diplomat and politician.

== Early years ==
Whitworth, the eldest of the three sons (there were also four daughters) and heir of Sir Charles Whitworth (a nephew of Charles Whitworth, 1st Baron Whitworth), was born at Leybourne Grange, Kent, on 19 May 1752 and baptised there on 29 May 1752. He was educated at Tonbridge School, his preceptors there including James Cawthorn and "Mr. Towers".

He entered the Grenadier Guards in April 1772 as ensign, became captain in May 1781, and was eventually on 8 April 1783 appointed lieutenant-colonel of the 104th Regiment of Foot. His transference from military life to diplomacy is not easy to explain, but in the account given by Nathaniel William Wraxall, disfigured though it is by malicious or purely fanciful embroidery, there is perhaps a nucleus of truth. Whitworth was

highly favoured by nature, and his address exceeded even his figure. At every period of his life queens, duchesses, and countesses have showered on him their regard. The Duke of Dorset, recently sent ambassador to France (1783), being an intimate friend of Mr. Whitworth, made him known to the queen (Marie-Antoinette), who not only distinguished him by flattering marks of her attention, but interested herself in promoting his fortune, which then stood greatly in need of such patronage.

The good offices of the Queen and Dorset, according to this authority, procured for Whitworth in June 1785 his appointment as envoy-extraordinary and minister-plenipotentiary to Poland, of which country the unfortunate Stanisław Poniatowski was still the nominal monarch. He was at Warsaw during the troubled period immediately preceding the second partition. Recalled early in 1788, he was in the following August nominated envoy-extraordinary and minister-plenipotentiary at St. Petersburg, a post which he held for nearly twelve years.

== Envoy-Extraordinary and Minister-Plenipotentiary at St. Petersburg ==
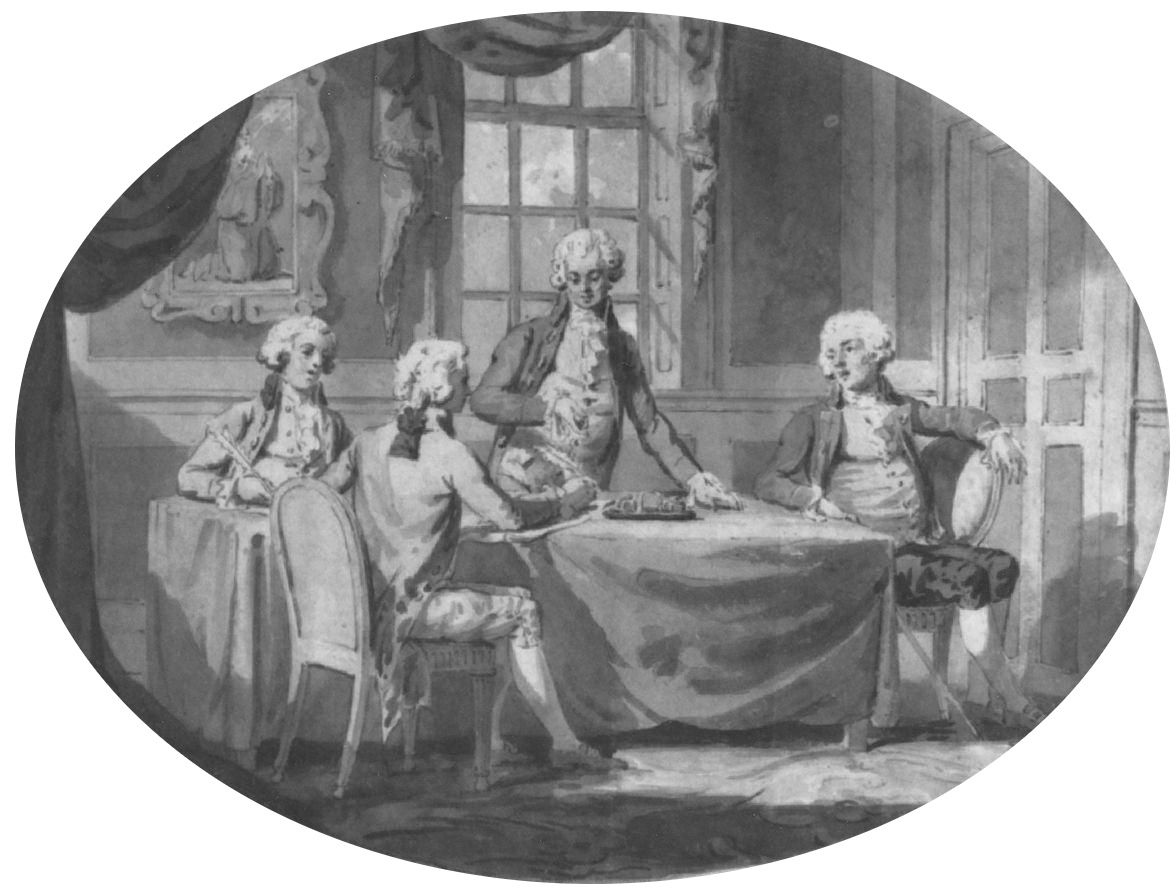
Plenipotentiaries of Britain, Holland, Prussia and Russia signing the Treaty of 1791

Whitworth was well received by Catherine the Great, who was then at war with the Ottoman Empire, but the harmony between the two countries was disturbed during the winter of 1790–91 by William Pitt's subscription to the view of the Prussian government that the three allies (Britain, Prussia and the Netherlands) could not with impunity allow the balance of power in Eastern Europe to be disturbed. Pitt hoped by a menace of sending a British fleet to the Baltic to constrain Russia to make restitution of its chief conquest, Oczakow and the adjoining territory as far as the Dniester, and thus to realise his idea of confining the ambition of Russia in the south-east as well as that of France in the north-west portion of Europe. The Russian government replied by an uncompromising refusal to listen to the proposal of restitution.

War began to be talked of, and Whitworth sent in a memorandum in which he dwelt upon the strength of the Empress's determination and the great display of vigour that would be necessary to overcome it. In the spring of 1791 he wrote of a French adventurer, named St. Ginier, who had appeared at St. Petersburg with a plan for invading Bengal by way of Kashmir, and in July he communicated to George Grenville a circumstantial account of a plot to burn the British fleet at Portsmouth by means of Irish and other incendiaries in Russian pay. In the meantime Pitt had become alarmed at the opposition to his Russian policy in parliament, Edmund Burke and Charles James Fox both uttering powerful speeches against the restoration of Oczakow to the Porte, and early in April 1791 a messenger was hastily dispatched to St. Petersburg to keep back the ultimatum which Whitworth had on 27 March been ordered to present to the Empress. His relations with the Russian court were now for a short period considerably strained. Catherine, elated by recent victories of Alexander Suvorov, said to him with an ironical smile: "Sir, since the king your master is determined to drive me out of Petersburg, I hope he will permit me to retire to Constantinople". Gradually, however, through the influence of Madame Gerepzof, the sister of the favourite, the celebrated Platon Zubov, and in consequence of the alarm excited in the mind of Catherine by the course things were taking in France, Whitworth more than recovered his position.

Great Britain's influence upon the peace finally concluded at the Treaty of Jassy on 9 January 1792 was, it is true, little more than nominal, but Whitworth obtained some credit for the achievement, together with the cross of the Order of the Bath (17 November 1793). Wraxall's statement that the relations between Whitworth and Madame Gerepzof were similar to those between John Churchill, 1st Duke of Marlborough, and the Barbara Palmer, 1st Duchess of Cleveland, is utterly incredible.

The gradual rapprochement between the views of Russia and Britain was brought about mainly by the common dread of any revolutionary infection from the quarter of France, and in February 1795 Catherine was induced to sign a preliminary treaty, by the terms of which she was to furnish the coalition with at least sixty-five thousand men in return for a large monthly subsidy from the British government. This treaty was justly regarded as a triumph for Whitworth's diplomacy, though, unfortunately, just before the date fixed for its final ratification by both countries, the Empress was struck down by mortal illness (November 1796). Paul I, in his desire to adopt an original policy, refused to affix his signature, and it was not until June 1798 that the outrage committed by the French upon the Knights Hospitaller at Malta, who had chosen him for their protector, disposed him to listen to the solicitations of Whitworth. The latter obtained his adhesion to an alliance with Great Britain offensive and defensive, with the object of putting a stop to the further encroachments of France, in December 1798, and the treaty paved the way for the operations of Suvorov and Alexander Korsakov in Northern Italy and the Alps.

Whitworth was now at the zenith of his popularity in St. Petersburg, and Paul pressed the British government to raise him to the peerage. The request was readily complied with, and on 21 March 1800 the ambassador was made Baron Whitworth, of Newport Pratt in the County of Mayo, in the Peerage of Ireland; but before the patent could reach him the Tsar had been reconciled to Napoleon. Irritated, moreover, by the British seizure and retention of Malta, Paul abruptly dismissed Whitworth, and thereupon commenced that angry correspondence which developed into the combination of northern powers against Great Britain.

== Interlude in Denmark ==
In July 1800 the seizure by HMS Nemesis and a British squadron of the Danish frigate Freya and her convoy for opposing the British right of search led to strained relations with Denmark. In order to anticipate any hostile move from Danes, the British government dispatched Whitworth in August on a special mission to Copenhagen. To give greater weight to his representations, a squadron of nine ships of the line, with five frigates and four bomb vessels, was ordered to the Sound under Admiral Archibald Dickson. The Danish shore batteries were as yet very incomplete, and Whitworth's arguments for the time being proved effectual. He returned to England on 27 September, and on 5 November was made a privy councillor.

== Marriage ==
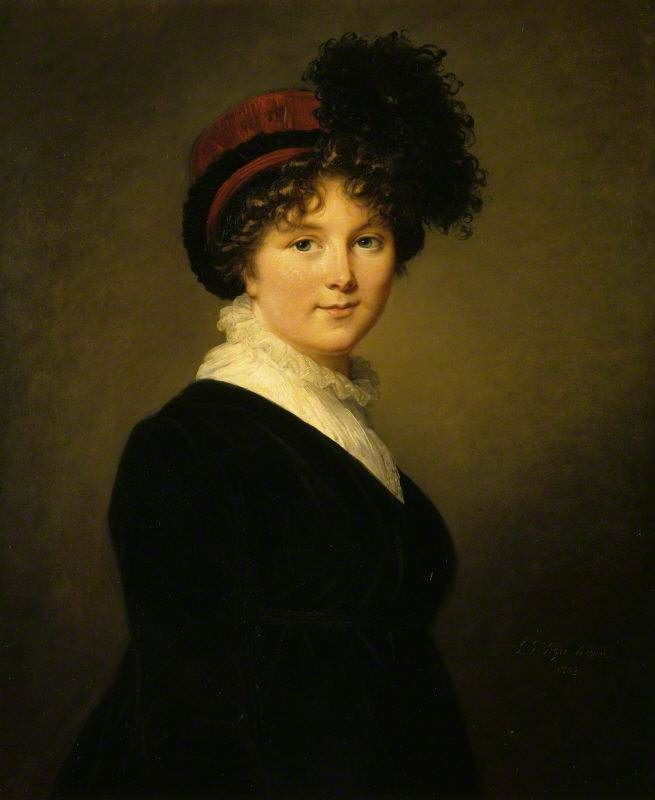
Arabella Diana Cope, Duchess of Dorset by Élisabeth Louise Vigée Le Brun, 1803

His former friend, John Sackville, 3rd Duke of Dorset, had died in July 1799, and on 7 April 1801 he married the widow Duchess Arabella Diana Cope (daughter of Sir Charles Cope, Bt., by Catherine, fifth daughter of Cecil Bisshop, bart., of Parham, who afterwards married Charles Jenkinson, 1st Earl of Liverpool). She was a capable woman of thirty-two, with a taste for power and pleasure, says Wraxall, kept "always subordinate to her economy". By the death of the Duke she came into possession of £13,000 a year, besides the borough of East Grinstead, while Dorset House and Knole Park subsequently passed into her hands.

== Ambassador at Paris ==
The Treaty of Amiens was concluded on 27 March 1802, and Whitworth, whose means were now fully adequate to the situation, was chosen to fill the important post of ambassador at Paris. His instructions were dated 10 September 1802, and two months later he set out with a large train, being received at Calais with enthusiasm; a considerable period had elapsed since a British ambassador had been seen in France. He was presented to Napoleon and Joséphine de Beauharnais on 7 December, and six days later his wife was received at St. Cloud. The Duchess, whose hauteur was very pronounced, had considerable scruples about calling upon the wife of Charles Maurice de Talleyrand-Périgord. As early as 23 December Whitworth mentions in a despatch the rumour that the first consul was meditating a divorce from his wife and the assumption of the imperial title, but during his first two months' sojourn in Paris there seemed a tacit agreement to avoid disagreeable subjects. Napoleon ignored the attacks of the English press, the retention of Malta, and the protracted evacuation of Ottoman Egypt, while Britain kept silence as to the recent French aggressions in Holland, Piedmont, Elba, Parma, and Switzerland.

The British government was, however, obstinate in its refusal to quit Malta until a guarantee had been signed by the various powers ensuring the possession of the island to the knights of St. John. This difficulty, which constituted the darkest cloud on the diplomatic horizon, was first raised by Talleyrand on 27 January 1803. Three days later was published a report filling eight pages of Le Moniteur Universel from Colonel Horace François Bastien, baron Sébastiani, who had been sent by Napoleon upon a special mission of inquiry to Egypt. In this report military information was freely interspersed with remarks disparaging to Britain, in which country the document was plausibly interpreted as a preface to a second invasion of Egypt by the French. The Addington ministry consequently instructed Whitworth, through the foreign minister Lord Hawkesbury, to stiffen his back against any demand for the prompt evacuation of Malta. On 18 Feb Napoleon summoned the ambassador, and, after a stormy outburst of rhetoric, concluded with the memorable appeal, "Unissons-nous plutôt que de nous combattre, et nous réglerons ensemble les destinées du monde." Any significance that this offer might have had was more than neutralised by the first consul's observation, "Ce sont des bagatelles" (much commented upon in Britain), when, in answer to reproaches about Malta, Whitworth hinted at the augmentation of French power in Piedmont, Switzerland, and elsewhere.

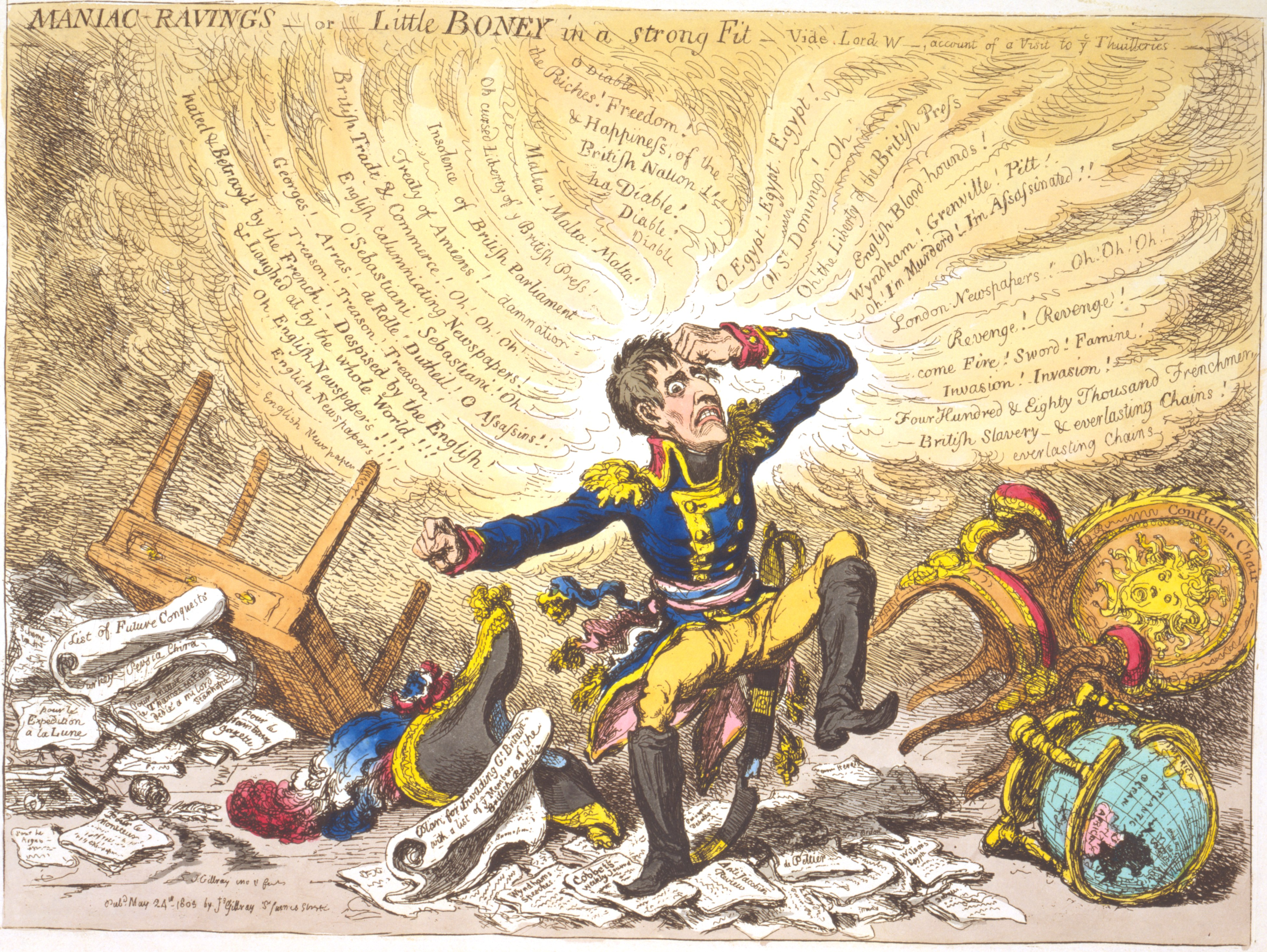
In Maniac-Ravings—or—Little Boney in a strong Fit (1803), James Gillray caricatured Napoleon's tirade to Whitworth at the Tuileries Palace on 13 March 1803.

The crisis, of extreme importance in the career of Napoleon ("il était arrivé," says Pierre Lanfrey, "à l'instant le plus critique de sa carrière") as well as in the history of Britain, was arrived at on 13 March 1803, the date of the famous scene between Napoleon and the British ambassador at the Tuileries. At the close of a violent tirade before a full court, interrupted by asides to foreign diplomatists expressive of the bad faith of the British, Napoleon exclaimed loudly to Whitworth, "Malheur à ceux qui ne respectent pas les traités. Ils en seront responsables à toute l'Europe." ("Woe to those who do not respect treaties! They will be responsible to all Europe.") "He was too agitated," says the ambassador, "to prolong the conversation; I therefore made no answer, and he retired to his apartment repeating the last phrase." Two hundred people heard this conversation ("if such it can be called"), "and I am persuaded," adds Whitworth, "that there was not a single person who did not feel the extreme impropriety of his conduct and the total want of dignity as well as of decency on the occasion." The interview was not, however, a final one (as has often erroneously been stated). Whitworth was received by the first consul once again on 4 April, when the corps diplomatique were kept waiting for an audience for four hours while Napoleon inspected knapsacks. "When that ceremony was performed he received us, and I had every reason to be satisfied with his manner towards me" (Whitworth to Hawkesbury, 4 April 1803). Napoleon wished to temporise until his preparations were a little more advanced, but any actions henceforth had little real significance. On 1 May an indisposition prevented the ambassador from attending the reception at the Tuileries, on 12 May he demanded his passports, and on 18 May Britain declared war against France. Whitworth reached London on 20 May, having encountered the French ambassador, Antoine-François Andréossy, three days earlier at Dover. Throughout the trying scenes with the first consul, his demeanour was generally admitted to have been marked by a dignity and an impassive gravity worthy of the best traditions of aristocratic diplomacy.

Irritated by his failure to stun him by a display of violence (such as that which had so daunted the Venetian plenipotentiaries before the treaty of Campo Formio), Napoleon did not hesitate to suggest in one of his journals that Whitworth had been privy to the murder of Paul I in Russia. At St. Helena in July 1817 he alluded to him with calmness as "habile" and "adroit", but he always maintained that the accepted version of the celebrated interview of 13 March was "plein des faussetés".

== Later years ==
After his return, not occupying a seat in either house of parliament, Whitworth sank for ten years into comparative insignificance. In 1809 he was commissioned as Lieutenant-Colonel Commandant of the Sevenoaks and Bromley Regiment of Local Militia. However, in 1813, owing to his wife's connection with Lord Liverpool, he was made on 2 March a Lord of the Bedchamber to George III, and on 3 June was appointed Lord Lieutenant of Ireland, in succession to Charles Lennox, 4th Duke of Richmond, a post which he held until October 1817. In the same month he was created an English peer as Viscount Whitworth, of Adbaston in the County of Stafford. On 2 January 1815 he was promoted to the grand cross of the Bath, and on 25 November was created Baron Adbaston, in the County of Stafford, and Earl Whitworth. After the restoration of the Bourbons in France, which as a political expedient he highly approved, he visited Paris in April 1819 with the Duchess of Dorset and a numerous train. His official capacity was denied, but he was generally deemed to have been charged with a mission of observation. He visited Louis XVIII and the princes, but carefully avoided any interview with the ministers. He revisited Paris in the following October on his way to Naples, where he was received with great distinction, though political significance was again disclaimed for the visit. He returned to England and settled at Knole Park in 1820, his last public appearance being as assistant lord sewer at the coronation of George IV on 19 July 1821.

== Death ==
Lord Whitworth died without issue at Knole on 13 May 1825, when all his honours became extinct. His will was proved on 30 May by the Duchess of Dorset, his universal legatee, the personalty being sworn under £70,000. The Duchess died at Knole on 1 August following, and was buried on 10 August at Withyam, Sussex, twenty-two horsemen following her remains to the grave. Her only son (by her first husband), George John Frederick Sackville, 4th Duke of Dorset, having died in 1815 after a fall from his horse, her large property (estimated at £35,000 per annum) was divided between her two sons-in-law, Other Archer Windsor, 6th Earl of Plymouth and George Sackville-West, 5th Earl De La Warr. "Knole in Kent was judiciously bequeathed to the former, he being the richer man of the two, on the express condition that his lordship should expend £6,000. per annum on this favourite residence of the Sackvilles for several centuries".

Excavation of Whitworth's grave in the 1990s revealed the poor state of his teeth, resulting from the dangerous products used in his time to clean teeth.

== Likenesses ==
Whitworth, according to Napoleon, was a "fort bel homme", and this description is confirmed by the portrait by Sir Thomas Lawrence, an engraving from which appears in Doyle's Official Baronage. There is a very fine mezzotint engraving of this portrait by Charles Turner. The original forms one of the small collection of British masters in the Louvre at Paris. A portrait of "Captain Whitworth" of much earlier date, engraved by Robert Laurie after Anton Graff, is identified by John Chaloner Smith as a portrait of the diplomatist.

== Sources ==
- David Bayne Horn: British diplomatic representatives, 1689–1789. – London : Offices of the Society, 1932, pp. 94, 119.
- Stanley Thomas Bindoff: British diplomatic representatives, 1789–1852. – London : Offices of the Society, 1934, pp. 108–109.

Diplomatic posts
Preceded by Viscount Dalrymple	British Envoy to Poland; 1785–1787	Succeeded by Daniel Hailes
Preceded by Alleyne FitzHerbert	British Ambassador to Russia; 1788–1800	Unknown Next known title holder: The Lord St Helens
Preceded by The Marquess Cornwallis as Plenipotentiary	British Ambassador to France; 1802–1803	Vacant Napoleonic Wars Title next held by The Duke of Wellington in 1814
Government offices
Preceded by The Duke of Richmond	Lord Lieutenant of Ireland; 1813–1817	Succeeded by The Earl Talbot
