= John Cope =

John Cope may refer to:

- John Cope (died 1414), MP for Northamptonshire
- John Cope (died 1558), MP for Northamptonshire
- Sir John Cope, 5th Baronet (fl. 1699), MP for Banbury
- Sir John Cope, 6th Baronet (1673–1749), British banker and politician
- Sir John Cope (British Army officer) (1690–1760), British general during the 1745 Jacobite Uprising
- John Lachlan Cope (1893–1947), biologist and surgeon with the Imperial Trans-Antarctic Expedition
- Jack Cope (cricketer) (John James Cope, 1908-1995), English cricketer and footballer
- Jack Cope (1913–1991), South African writer
- John Cope, Baron Cope of Berkeley (born 1937), British politician
- John Cope, Welsh geologist; see Geology of South Wales
- A pseudonym used by surgeon Hastings Gilford (1861–1941)
- A pseudonym used by Talk Talk's frontman Mark Hollis (1955–2019)

== See also ==
- "Hey, Johnnie Cope, Are Ye Waking Yet?", Scottish folk song
- General Sir John Coape Sherbrooke (1764–1830), British general and Governor of British North Canada
- Jonathan Cope (disambiguation)
- Cope (surname)
