= Mary Sackville (1792–1864) =

English noble (1792-1864)

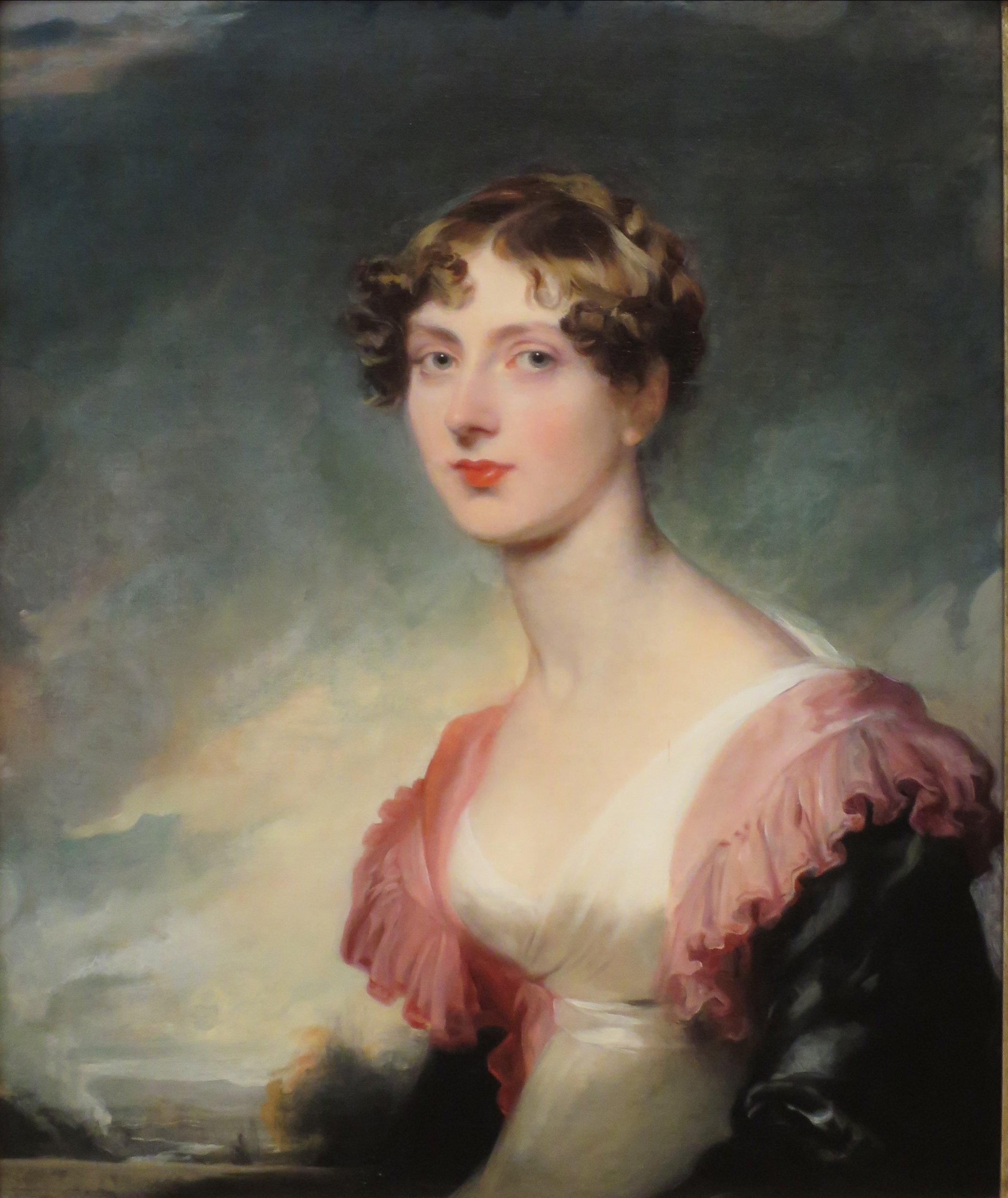
- Portrait of the Countess of Plymouth by Thomas Lawrence, 1817
- Born: 30 July 1792
- Died: 20 July 1864 (aged 71)
- Title: Lady Mary Sackville
- Spouse(s): Other Windsor (m. 1811; died 1833) William Amherst (m. 1839; died 1857)
- Parents: John Sackville (father); Arabella Diana Cope (mother)
- Relatives: Elizabeth Sackville (sister); George Sackville (brother)

Lady Mary Sackville (30 July 1792 – 20 July 1864), also known by her married names as the Mary, Countess of Plymouth and the Countess Amherst of Arracan, was a British noblewoman.

== Biography ==
Mary was born into the prestigious Sackville family, the eldest child of John Sackville, 3rd Duke of Dorset and his wife Arabella Diana Cope. Her father died in 1799. On the death of her mother in 1825, she inherited the Kent estate at Knole. She was Countess of Plymouth as the wife of Other Windsor. In 1839 she married William Amherst, 1st Earl Amherst of Arracan (1773-1857). She died without issue and her estate went to her sister Elizabeth Sackville-West, Countess De La Warr.
