= Juniper Hall =

Country house in Surrey, England

Coordinates: 51.2614°N 0.3208°W

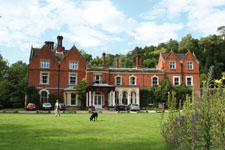
Juniper Hall Field Centre

Juniper Hall FSC Field Centre is an 18th-century country house, leased from the National Trust, on the east slopes of Mickleham in the deep Mole Gap of the North Downs in Surrey, England. The varying contours of the slopes provide habitats and environments for study including unimproved chalk grassland, coppiced woodlands, heathland and freshwater (rivers, streams and springs).

== Use ==
The building is leased from the National Trust for science and geographical studies. It is an 18th-century country house on the east slopes of Mickleham in the deep Mole Gap. It is 500m from the foot of Box Hill and 40 kilometres (25 mi) from London. The varying contours of the slopes provide habitats and environments for study including unimproved chalk grassland, coppiced woodlands, heathland and freshwater (rivers, streams and springs). Opened as a field centre in 1947, Juniper Hall was one of the original four centres opened and among around 10 main premises used today.

== History ==
The house was originally a public house: The Royal Oak, part of Fridley or Fredley manor of Mickleham bought in 1762 by Cecil Bishopp, briefly 7th Baronet and occupied by him. He made extensive (tree) plantations on slopes beside where "he had purposed to erect a mansion; but relinquishing that design, he enlarged and fitted up an ale-house on the road-side ... the Royal Oak, belonging to the estate, for his own residence; and this dwelling obtained the designation of Juniper-hall, from the abundance of Juniper trees growing in the neighbourhood". It was 35 miles from the Bishopp family's Parham Park and his son inherited a family title of Lord Zouche. David Jenkinson a wealthy "lottery owner" bought it and let it from 1780 to Benjamin Elliott when according to historian Brayley (1841) skeletons of two Anglo-Saxons "in full war apparel" were found while the house was being extended.

The house was leased by Jenkinson to a group of French emigres from 1792 to 1793 which included Charles Maurice de Talleyrand-Périgord, Louis, comte de Narbonne-Lara, Germaine de Staël, General D'Arblay, Gérard de Lally-Tollendal, Madame de Broglie and Princess d'Henin. General D'Arblay met Fanny Burney in the Templeton Room here. He later married her in the village church. In 1800 the house was sold with mixed woodland and garden of about 50 acres (0.20 km^{2}) to Thomas Broadwood, the son of John Broadwood and a member of the piano manufacturing family Broadwood and Sons. Jonathan Worrell bought the house with the reputed manor of Fridley and about 50 acres c. 1803: it was sold in 1814, either by Worrell or by his heirs.

The last private owners of the house were the MacAndrew family who had major building works carried out from 1882 to 1885, resulting the house's present form. Much of the earlier layout is now hidden, but the main office (formerly the morning room) and the Templeton room are little altered.

During World War II the house was occupied by the Canadian army in the buildup to the Normandy landings, and in 1945 it was sold by Miss MacAndrew to the National Trust. The trust owns and manages neighbouring Box Hill (excluding the linear, mainly early Victorian village).
