= Portrait of the Countess of Plymouth =

1817 painting by Thomas Lawrence

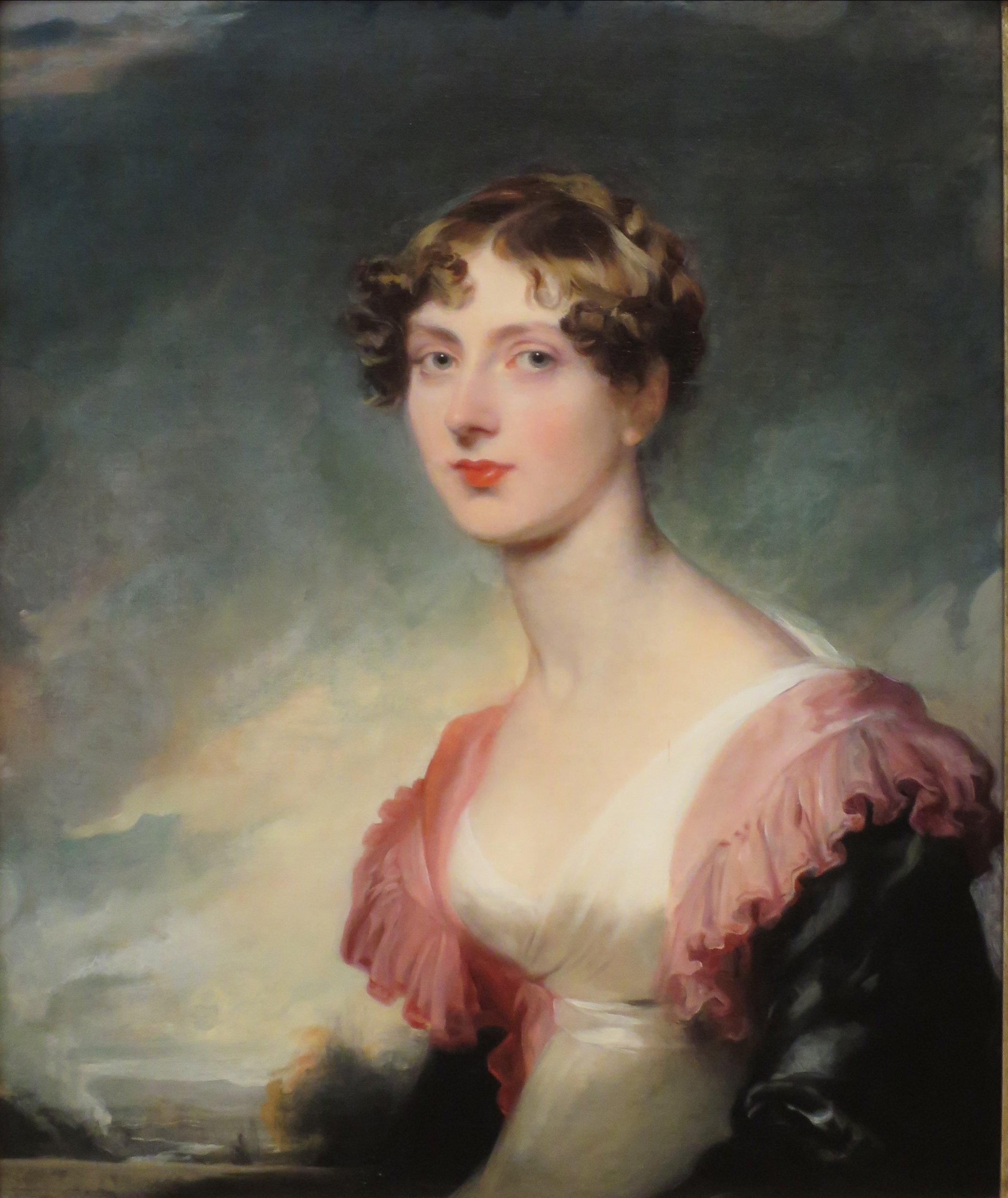
- Artist: Thomas Lawrence
- Year: 1817
- Type: Oil on canvas, portrait painting
- Dimensions: 76.8 cm × 63.5 cm (30.2 in × 25.0 in)
- Location: Legion of Honor, San Francisco

Portrait of the Countess of Plymouth is an 1817 oil on canvas portrait painting by the British artist Thomas Lawrence. It depicts the English aristocrat Mary Sackville who had married the Earl of Plymouth in 1811. Part of pendant portraits of the couple, it depicts the countess in the Romantic style Lawrence made fashionable during the Regency era.

Despite his prominence at the time Lawrence did not exhibit this commission publicly at the Rotal Academy. At one time it was part of the collection of Knole in Kent, the historic residence of her own family the Sackvilles. In 1935 it featured at an exhibition in London commemorating the Silver Jubilee. Since 1972 it has been owned by the Legion of Honor museum in San Francisco.

== Bibliography ==
- Garlick, Kenneth. Sir Thomas Lawrence: A Complete Catalogue of the Oil Paintings. Phaidon, 1989.
- Gower, Ronald Sutherland. George Romney And Sir Thomas Lawrence. Scribner and Welford, 1882.
- Sabin, Sidney F. Spring Exhibition Silver Jubilee: English XVIIIth Century Paintings. Eyre & Spottiswoode, 1935.
