= Arabella Diana Cope =

British noblewoman (1767–1825)

- Duchess of Dorset
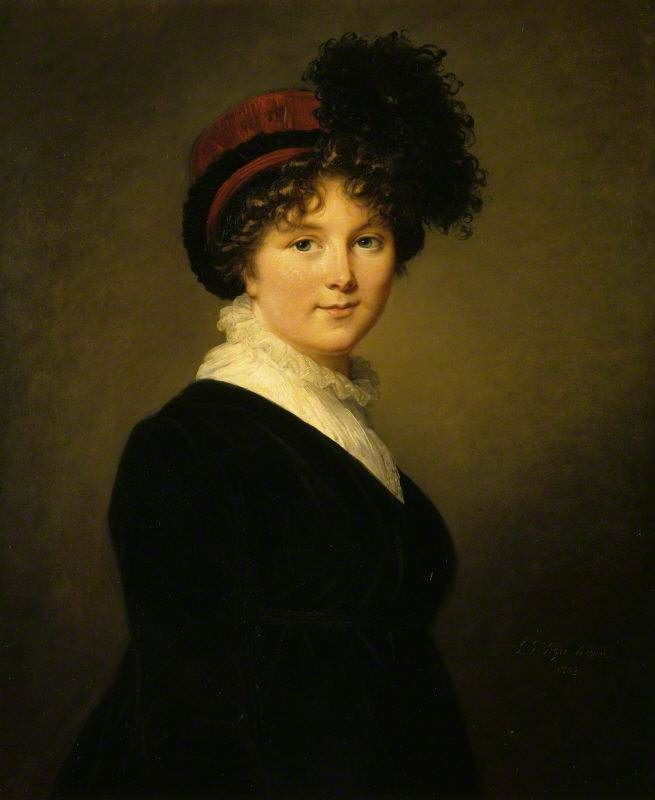
- Arabella in 1803
- Reign: 4 January 1790 – 19 July 1799
- Predecessor: Elizabeth Colyear (1720-1765)
- Successor: Title extinct (1843)
- Born: 1767; England
- Died: 1 August 1825 (aged 58); England
- Buried: St Michael and All Saints Churchyard, Withyham, East Sussex, England
- Noble family: Cope (by birth); Sackville (by first marriage); Whitworth (by second marriage)
- Spouses: John Sackville, 3rd Duke of Dorset; Charles Whitworth, 1st Earl Whitworth
- Issue: Mary Sackville; George Sackville, 4th Duke of Dorset; Elizabeth Sackville-West, Baroness Buckhurst
- Father: Sir Charles Cope
- Mother: Catherine Bishopp

Arabella Diana Cope (1767 – 1 August 1825) was a British noblewoman. She was Duchess of Dorset by her first marriage to John Sackville, 3rd Duke of Dorset, and subsequently Countess of Whitworth by her second marriage to Charles Whitworth, 1st Earl Whitworth.

== Family ==
Arabella Diana was the second daughter of Sir Charles Cope, 2nd Baronet and his wife Catherine Bishopp. Her paternal grandparents were Jonathan Cope, and his first wife, Arabella Howard. Her maternal grandparents were Sir Cecil Bishopp, 6th Baronet and Anne Boscawen.

She had an older sister, Catherine Cope, Countess of Aboyne who was wife of George Gordon, 9th Marquess of Huntly.

By her mother Catherine's second marriage to Charles Jenkinson, 1st Earl of Liverpool, she had two half-siblings: Charlotte Jenkinson, wife of James Walter Grimston, 1st Earl of Verulam, and Charles Cecil Cope Jenkinson, 3rd Earl of Liverpool, husband of Julia Evelyn Medley Shuckburgh-Evelyn. Her step-brother was the Prime Minister Robert Jenkinson, 2nd Earl of Liverpool who served from 1812 to 1827.

== Biography ==
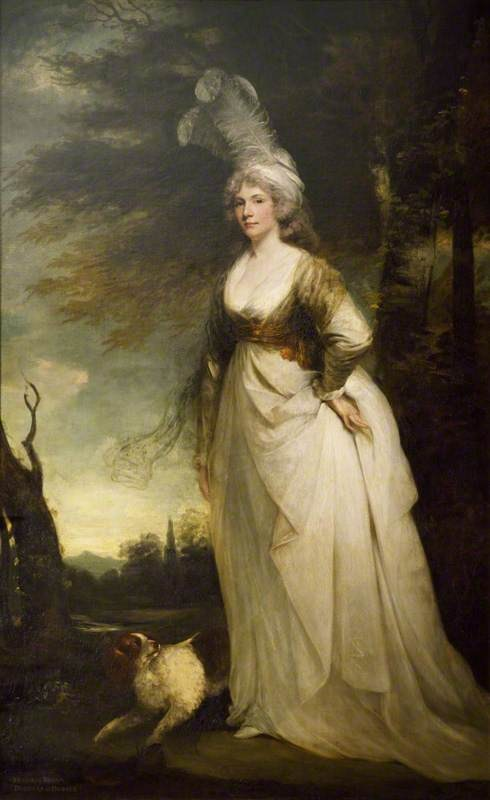
The Duchess in 1790 by John Hoppner.

At the age of 22 or 23, she married John Frederick Sackville, 3rd Duke of Dorset, aged 44, on 4 January 1790. He was the son of Lord John Sackville and Frances Leveson-Gower.

In a period of rising land rents Arabella proved an able businesswoman. She managed the Sackville estates in Kent, Sussex, Essex, Oxfordshire, Gloucestershire, Warwickshire, Derbyshire and Staffordshire, amassing extreme wealth.

The couple had three children, two girls and a boy. Her husband died on 19 July 1799, at the age of 54.

Less than two years later, Arabella married the future earl Charles Whitworth on 7 April 1801. Charles was the son of Sir Charles Whitworth, a Member of Parliament and his wife Martha Shelley.

She became Countess of Whitworth on 25 November 1815, on her second husband's accession.

Charles died on 13 May 1825, aged 72. She died a few months later on 1 August 1825, aged about 58.

== Descendants ==
From her first marriage:

- Mary Sackville (30 July 1792 – 20 July 1864), was Countess of Plymouth as the wife of Other Windsor, 6th Earl of Plymouth. After his death, she became Countess Amherst of Arracan as the wife of William Amherst, 1st Earl Amherst, Governor-General of British India. She had no offspring.
- George John Frederick Sackville, 4th Duke of Dorset (15 November 1793 – 14 February 1815), did not marry and had no children
- Elizabeth Sackville-West, Baroness Buckhurst of Buckhurst (11 August 1795 – 9 January 1870), was Countess of La Warr as the wife of George Sackville-West, 5th Earl De La Warr, with whom she had nine children.
