= Sir Charles Cope, 2nd Baronet =

British aristocrat

- Born: 1743
- Died: 14 June 1781 (aged 37–38)
- Spouse: Catherine Bishopp
- Children: Arabella Diana Cope
- Relatives: Jonathan Cope (grandfather)

Sir Charles Cope, 2nd Baronet (c. 1743 – 14 June 1781) was a British aristocrat.

He was the eldest son of Jonathan Cope, the eldest son of Sir Jonathan Cope, 1st Baronet. His father was baptised on 27 October 1717 at Sarsden, Oxfordshire, and died on 2 November 1763. His mother was Arabella Howard, a daughter of Henry Howard, 4th Earl of Carlisle.

He succeeded to his grandfather's baronetcy in April 1765, and was Sheriff of Cambridgeshire and Huntingdonshire, 1773–74. He married in 1767, Catherine, fifth and youngest daughter of Sir Cecil Bishopp, 6th Baronet, by Anne Boscawen, daughter of Hugh Boscawen, 1st Viscount Falmouth.

He died on 14 June 1781 and was buried 4 days later at Hanwell, Oxfordshire. He was succeeded by his eldest son Charles, who was a student at Eton College. The third baronet died aged 11 on 25 December 1781, and was also buried at Hanwell. The baronetcy passed to the second baronet's half-brother, Jonathan, while the estates devolved to the third baronet's two sisters: Arabella Diana and Charlotte Anne. Both married aristocrats: Arabella Diana married John Sackville, 3rd Duke of Dorset, while Charlotte Anne married George Gordon, 5th Earl of Aboyne, who (after his wife's death) became the 9th Marquess of Huntly.

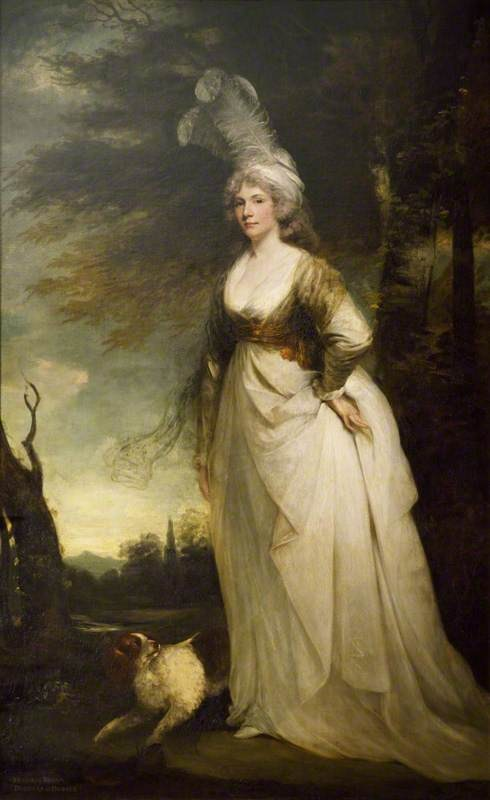
Arabella, Duchess of Dorset by John Hoppner, 1790

Catherine Bishopp was born on 30 November 1744. After Cope's death she married (as his second wife) Charles Jenkinson, 1st Earl of Liverpool, on 22 June 1782 at her house in Hertford Street, London. She died aged 82 on 1 October 1827 in the same house, and was buried on 10 October 1827 at Buxted, Sussex.

Baronetage of Great Britain
Preceded by Jonathan Cope	Baronet (of Bruern); 1765–1781	Succeeded by Charles Cope
