= Sir Cecil Bishopp, 6th Baronet =

British politician

Sir Cecil Bishopp, 6th Baronet (30 October 1700 – 15 June 1778), later Bisshopp, was a British politician. He succeeded to the title of 6th Baronet Bishopp, of Parham, co. Sussex on 25 October 1725. He was Member of Parliament for Penryn between 1727 and 1734, having been returned unopposed on the interest of the Boscawen family into which he had married. He also represented Boroughbridge between 1755 and 1768. He married Hon. Anne Boscawen, daughter of Hugh Boscawen, 1st Viscount Falmouth and Charlotte Godfrey, in 1726. In addition to Parham Park, Sussex he was also the owner of a house at 11 Berkeley Square, London which Horace Walpole purchased from Bisshopp's heirs in 1779 and in which Walpole lived until he died there in 1797. Sir Cecil died on 15 June 1778 at the age of 77.

== Issue ==
Sir Cecil was noted for having a large number of children, at least thirteen, for the period, so many that it "caused some remark in contemporary society". While large families were not uncommon it was unusual for an aristocratic family to have so many legitimate children. In June 1760 Horace Walpole noted Sir Cecil's "endless hoard of beautiful daughters". As a result, on several occasions over the years he lobbied the Duke of Newcastle for various sinecures and government positions. In 1748 he asked for "the reversion of the controllership of army accounts, or failing that, a place in the revenue commission". He explained "the reason, my Lord, for my thus importuning you is a very cogent one, a numerous family, scarce in the power of frugality to support." On 2 Oct. 1750 he wrote again: The last time I had the honour to be with your Grace ... you gave me leave to trouble you with a letter, in case an employment should become vacant ... I then mentioned ... superintendent of the royal brass foundries at Woolwich ... Tis a sinecure, and the salary £500 a year, and no more." In 1751 Bishopp received his appointment, and later was appointed Superintendent of H.M.'s Founderies in August 1751. In addition the Duke of Newcastle ensured his second son being made a page to the new Prince of Wales. His daughter Frances was also appointed a Maid of Honour to Queen Charlotte.

At a London ball 7 June 1760 Horace Walpole writes to the Earl of Strafford that there appeared "a new Miss Bishop from Sir Cecil's endless hoard of beautiful daughters, who is still prettier than her sisters." Walpole probably was referring to Frances Bishopp, whose beauty he subsequently mentions in other correspondence. With his wife Anne, Sir Cecil had four sons and eight daughters:

1. Sir Cecil Bishopp, who owned Fridley Manor and was briefly 7th Bt. d. c Sep 1779, one year after his father. His son, Cecil, became the eighth baronet and succeeded to the title of 12th Lord Zouche, of Haryngworth on 27 August 1815, after establishing his claim to this title through the families of Hedges, Tate and Zouche. On his death, the Barony of Zouche again fell into abeyance, between his two daughters.
2. Harriett Bishopp d. 1825 married 1st (1766) Thomas Dummer; married 2nd (1783) Nathaniel Dance the famous portrait painter whose subjects included Captain James Cook (from 4 July 1800 his name was Dance-Holland), created (1800) Baronet
3. Lucy Bishopp d. c Nov 1756
4. another daughter died young
5. Mary Bishopp d. c Mar 1757
6. Thomas Bishopp
7. Anne Bisshopp b. 1728, d. 8 Oct 1803, married 1759 Hon. Robert Brudenell; Brudenell was the third son of George Brudenell, 3rd Earl of Cardigan. Their son was Robert Brudenell, 6th Earl of Cardigan whose son, the 7th Earl, led the Charge of the Light Brigade in 1854, during the Crimea War.
8. Charlotte Bishopp b. 1731, d. 16 May 1762 married (1751) Sir William Maynard, 4th Baronet.
9. Edward Bishopp b. 14 Feb 1732/33, d. 1792. He married Jane Atkinson, daughter of William Atkinson. He lived at Chiswick, London, England. He became a very wealthy regimental army agent. His son became the Very Rev. Sir George Bisshopp, 9th Bt. b. 5 Jul 1791, d. 22 Mar 1834. In turn his two sons became in turn the 10th, 11th and last Baronets.
10. Frances Bishopp b. 1741, d. 16 Feb 1804, Maid of honour to Queen Charlotte 1761-4, married (1764) Sir George Warren, K.B.
11. Catherine Bishopp b. 30 Nov 1744, d. 1 Oct 1827, married 1st (1767) Sir Charles Cope, 2nd Baronet; married 2nd (1782) Charles Jenkinson 1st Earl of Liverpool, Baron Hawkesbury.
12. Colonel Henry Bishopp b. 1745, d. 1821

Child of Sir Cecil Bishopp, 6th Bt. and Sarah Owen, his housekeeper

1. Mary Owen b. c 1731, d. c 21 Mar 1770. She married 1747 Thomas Lillywhite, an accused smuggler.

== Smuggling ==
A few months before Sir Cecil's daughter Mary Owen married Thomas Lillywhite, Lillywhite was accused of smuggling (see 1747 Poole Raid Hawkhurst Gang). In 1748 Sir Cecil incurred the anger of the Duke of Richmond (the grandson of King Charles II of England) in the Duke's capacity as a Lord Justice, when he wrote twice in February 1748 two letters in an appeal for clemency for Thomas. In the first he says of Thomas Lillywhite:"He was esteemed by most of this neighbourhood, was but Seventeen years old : … and Such on Account of their Youth, I am told meet with mercy. This unfortunate person is Lately married to a young Woman of good fortune, and Creditable Parents. . . .[sic] His and her Relations, Solicit My weak endeavours of Assistance, I cannot deny them". However "the Duke was inexorable! [and] is so dead against the unfortunate youth that poor Sir Cecyl [sic] must have regretted his well-meant efforts at intervention. Thus runs his reply : I received yours of the 6th of Febry. And really cannot help wondering at your application in favor of a smuggler, especially for Thomas Lillywhite who has been guilty of such a heinous offence [the trial had not yet occurred]…and what astonishes me the more at your applying for such a one, is your having been so lately upon the bench… I assure you it has had such an effect upon my mind that I am shocked at an application for a smuggler. … How then dear Sir, can you, that I hope and believe wishes well to this government, or I that am sure do so, ever thinke of applying for any of these offenders?"

Undeterred by the Duke of Richmond's criticism, Sir Cecil appeared as a character witness for Thomas at the trial in the Old Bailey April 1749. In addition to Sir Cecil, Thomas also had Francis Wheeler give a character reference. He was the son of William Wheeler II, who was Lord of the Manor of Storrington in the neighbouring village to Parham, Sir Cecil's estate. However the Rev John Bishop (no relation to the Bishopp/Bisshopp Baronets) asks in his article "The Strange Case of Thomas Lillywhite - Was He a Smuggler?". Rev Bishop notes that Lillywhite was strongly defended on the basis that he was an innocent bystander asked to join in the raid at the last minute while he was riding in the Forest of Bere. However that was quite some distance from his home, around 30 miles away. Rev Bishop also reveals Thomas had a smuggler's nickname of "Slotch" used by smugglers to avoid being identified in public and that he wrote to the other smugglers from gaol indicating that he knew them beforehand. Of the forty-odd individuals involved in the Raid, only Thomas Lillywhite was acquitted and all of the others except one were executed or were killed before the trial. The beaten body of one of the smugglers who died before the trial was later found in the pond of Sir Cecil's Parham House estate after being dumped there some 12 miles from where he had been beaten to death by his accomplices.

Smuggling became associated with Jacobitism throughout Britain, partly because of the advantage of dealing through exiled Jacobites in France. In January 1745 Sir Cecil's younger brother, James (at one time served as aide-de-camp to the Duke of Arenberg was arrested at Pevensey as a Jacobite on trying to cross over to France.

Parliament of Great Britain
Preceded by Sidney Meadows; Edward Vernon	Member of Parliament for Penryn; 1727–1734; With: Edward Vernon	Succeeded by Sir Richard Mill; John Clavering
Preceded by John Fuller; William Murray	Member of Parliament for Boroughbridge; 1755–1768; With: William Murray (1755-6); Earl of Euston (1756); Thomas Thoroton (1757-61); Brice Fisher (1761-7); James West (1767-8)	Succeeded by Nathaniel Cholmley; James West
Baronetage of England
Preceded by Cecil Bishopp	Baronet (of Parham); 1725–1788	Succeeded by Cecil Bishopp
