= Sir Jonathan Cope, 4th Baronet =

British aristocrat

Sir Jonathan Cope, 4th Baronet (c. 1758 – 30 December 1821) was a British aristocrat.

He was the second son of Jonathan Cope, the eldest son of Sir Jonathan Cope, 1st Baronet. His mother was his father's second wife, Jane, the widow of Captain the Hon. Shaw Cathcart and daughter of Lieutenant-General Francis Leighton. In December 1781, he succeeded to the baronetcy on the death at Eton College of his eleven-year-old nephew Charles (the son of his elder half-brother Charles).

He was a cornet in the 21st Light Dragoons in 1782.

He married in April 1778, Annabella Candler, daughter of William Candler of Callan Castle, County Kilkenny, and Acomb, North Yorkshire, sometime Captain in the 10th Regiment of Foot, by Mary Vavasour, daughter of William Vavasour of Weston Hall, Yorkshire. Their three sons all died before them:

1. Jonathan was born in Dorset, and matriculated at Christ Church, Oxford, on 24 October 1798, aged 18. He received a Bachelor of Arts degree in 1802, became a priest, and was rector of Wraxall and Woodborough, Wiltshire, and vicar of Langridge, Somerset. He died unmarried aged 34 on 10 March 1814 at Reading, Berkshire.
2. Charles died unmarried on board HMS Hannibal at Port Royal on 30 September 1795.
3. Henry Thomas was killed at Seringapatam in 1792.

His wife died on 30 August 1819, and was buried at Great Malvern. He died on 30 December 1821 aged 63, and was buried in the Abbey Church there. The baronetcy became extinct, and his estate at Moreton Pinkney in Northamptonshire passed to his wife's nephew, Edward Candler.

Baronetage of Great Britain
Preceded by Charles Cope	Baronet (of Bruern); 1781–1821	Extinct
