= Cecil Bishop =

Cecil Bishop may refer to:

- C. W. Bishop (1890–1971), American politician
- Cecil-Bishop, Pennsylvania

== See also ==
- Cecil Bishopp (disambiguation)
