= Charles Jenkinson, 1st Earl of Liverpool =

British noble & statesman (1729–1808)

The Right Honourable The Earl of Liverpool PC
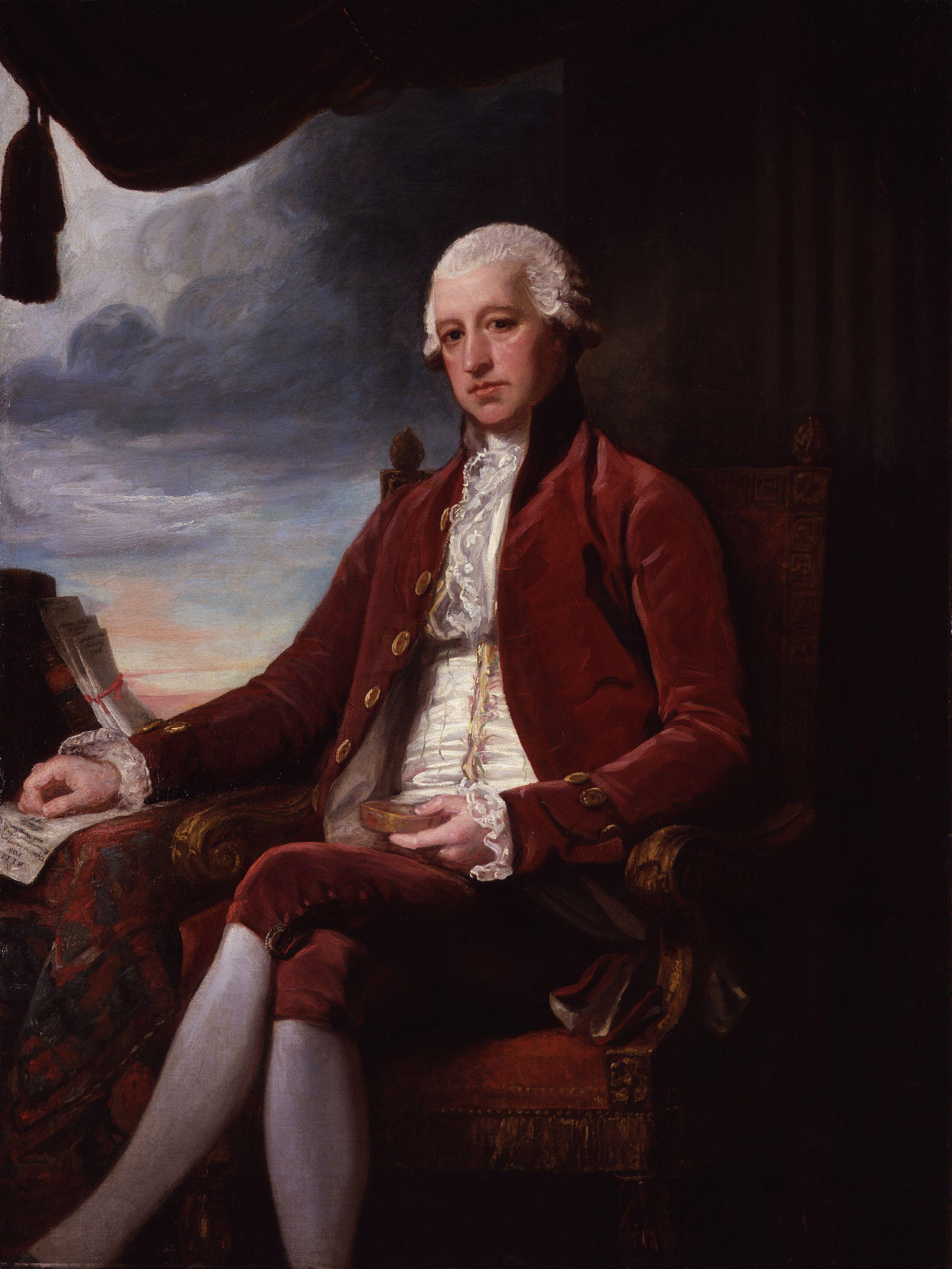
- Portrait by George Romney, c. 1786-1788

President of the Board of Trade
- In office 23 August 1786 – 7 June 1804
- Monarch: George III
- Prime Minister: William Pitt the Younger; Henry Addington
- Preceded by: The Lord Sydney (President of the Committee on Trade and Foreign Plantations)
- Succeeded by: The Duke of Montrose

Chancellor of the Duchy of Lancaster
- In office 6 September 1786 – 11 November 1803
- Monarch: George III
- Prime Minister: William Pitt the Younger; Henry Addington
- Preceded by: The Earl of Clarendon
- Succeeded by: Lord Pelham

Personal details
- Born: 26 April 1729 Winchester, Hampshire, England
- Died: 17 December 1808 (aged 79) London, England
- Spouses: Amelia Watts (m. 1769; died 1770) Catherine Bishopp (m. 1782)
- Children: 3, including Robert and Charles
- Education: University College, Oxford

Charles Jenkinson, 1st Earl of Liverpool (26 April 1729 – 17 December 1808), known as Lord Hawkesbury between 1786 and 1796, was a British statesman. He was the father of Prime Minister Robert Jenkinson, 2nd Earl of Liverpool.

== Early years, family and education ==
He was born in Winchester, the eldest son of Colonel Charles Jenkinson (1693–1750) and Amarantha (daughter of Wolfran Cornewall). The earl was the grandson of Sir Robert Jenkinson, 2nd Baronet, of Walcot, Oxfordshire. The Jenkinson family was descended from Anthony Jenkinson (died 1611), who was a sea-captain, merchant, and traveller and the first known Englishman to penetrate into Central Asia. Liverpool was educated at Charterhouse School and University College, Oxford, where he graduated Master of Arts in 1752.

== Political career ==
In 1761, Liverpool entered parliament as member for Cockermouth and was made Under-Secretary of State by Lord Bute. He won the favour of George III, and when Bute retired Jenkinson became the leader of the "King's Friends" in the House of Commons. In 1763, George Grenville appointed him joint Secretary to the Treasury.

In 1766, after a short retirement, he became a Lord of the Admiralty and then a Lord of the Treasury in the Grafton administration. In 1772, Jenkinson became a Privy Councillor and Vice Treasurer of Ireland, and in 1775 he purchased the lucrative sinecure of Clerk of the Pells in Ireland and became Master of the Mint of Ireland.

From 1778 until the close of Lord North's ministry in 1782 he was Secretary at War. From 1786 to 1804, he was President of the Board of Trade and Chancellor of the Duchy of Lancaster, and he was popularly regarded as enjoying the confidence of the king to a special degree.

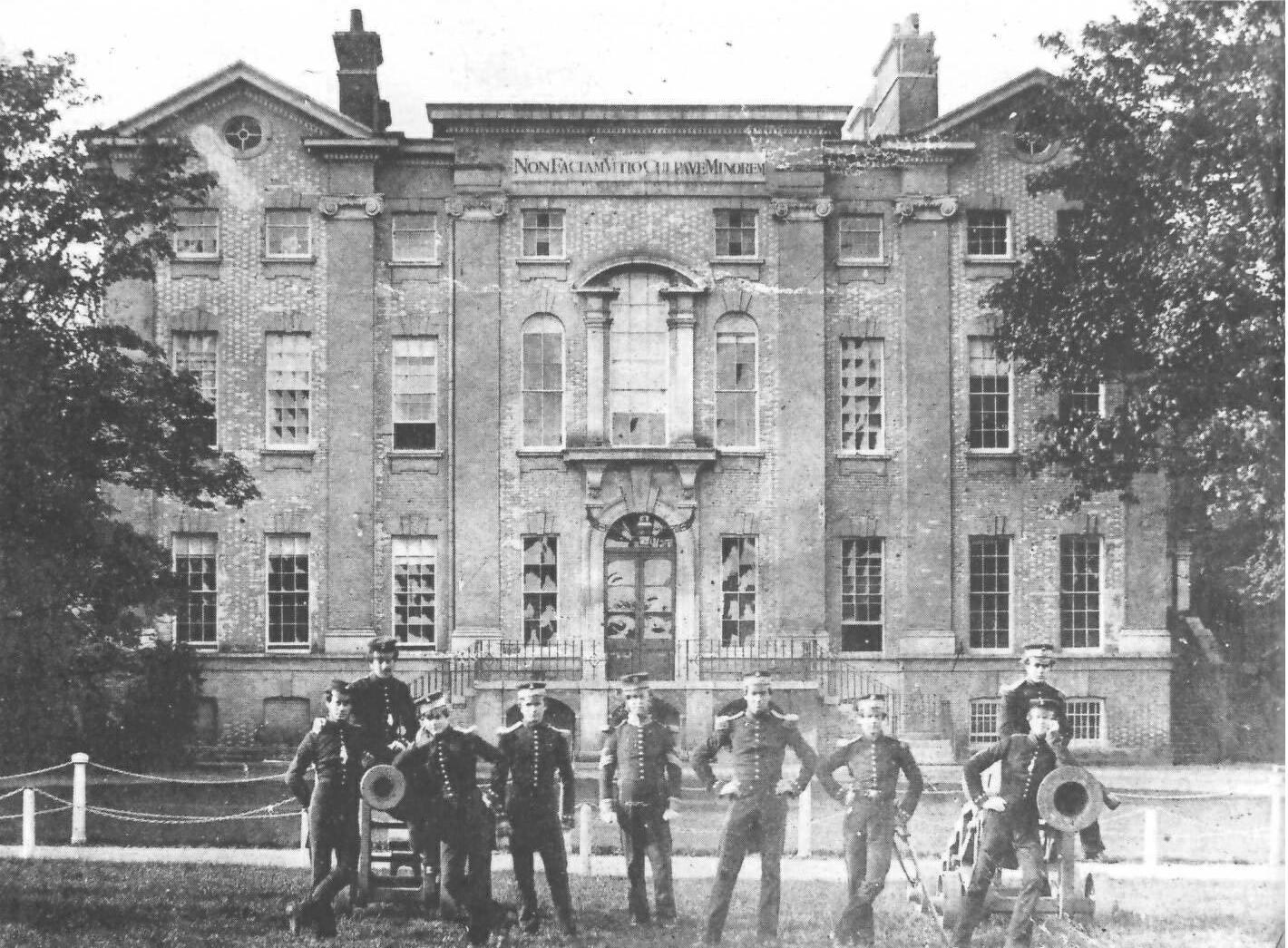
Addiscombe Place, c. 1859

In 1786 he was created Baron Hawkesbury, of Hawkesbury in the County of Gloucester, and ten years later, Earl of Liverpool. He also succeeded his cousin in 1790 as the 7th Baronet of Walcot and to the family estates. He lived at Addiscombe Place, Surrey and in Hawkesbury, Gloucestershire. He died in London on 17 December 1808.

== Family ==
Liverpool was twice married. In 1769 he married first Amelia, daughter of William Watts, governor of Fort William, Bengal, and of his wife, better known as Begum Johnson. Amelia died in July 1770, a month after the birth of her only child, Robert.

Liverpool married secondly Catherine Cope (née Bishopp), daughter of Sir Cecil Bishopp, 6th Baronet, and widow of Sir Charles Cope, 2nd Baronet, on 22 June 1782 at her house in Hertford Street, London. They had one son, Charles, who became 3rd Earl of Liverpool, and one daughter, Charlotte, who married James Grimston, 1st Earl of Verulam. His stepdaughter Arabella Diana Cope was married to John Sackville, 3rd Duke of Dorset and Charles Whitworth, 1st Earl Whitworth.

On Lord Liverpool's death, he was succeeded by his son from his first marriage, Robert, who became a prominent politician and eventually Prime Minister of the United Kingdom. The Countess of Liverpool died in October 1827, aged 82.

== Legacy ==
Liverpool wrote several political works, but according to the Encyclopædia Britannica Eleventh Edition, other than for his Treatise on the Coins of the Realm (1805) these are "without striking merits".

The Hawkesbury River in New South Wales, Australia and Hawkesbury, Ontario, Canada were named after Jenkinson shortly after he was created Baron Hawkesbury.

At least two ships were named after Jenkinson under his title of Lord Hawkesbury: one launched in America in 1781—presumably under another name—but entered in Lloyd's Register from 1787 as the Lord Hawkesbury, sailing as a whaler; and the East Indiaman Lord Hawkesbury, launched in 1787.

== Arms ==
Coat of arms of Charles Jenkinson, 1st Earl of Liverpool
Crest A sea-horse assurgent argent, maned azure, supporting a cross patée gules. Escutcheon Azure, a fess wavy argent charged with a cross patée gules, in chief two estoiles or, and, as an honourable augmentation, upon a chief wavy of the second a cormorant sable beaked and legged of the third, holding in the beak a branch of sea-weed (called layer) inverted vert. Supporters Two hawks, wings elevated and endorsed, proper, beaked, legged and belled or, charged on the breast with a cross patée gules. Motto Palma non sine pulvere (No reward without effort).

== Notes ==
Political offices
Preceded by Francis Gashry	Treasurer of the Ordnance; 1762–1763	Succeeded by John Ross Mackye
Preceded by The Lord Sydney as President of the Committee on Trade and Foreign Plantations	President of the Board of Trade; 1786–1804	Succeeded by The Duke of Montrose
Preceded by The Earl of Clarendon	Chancellor of the Duchy of Lancaster; 1786–1803	Succeeded by The Lord Pelham
Parliament of Great Britain
Preceded by Sir John Mordaunt; Percy Wyndham-O'Brien	Member of Parliament for Cockermouth; 1761–1767; With: Sir John Mordaunt	Succeeded by Sir John Mordaunt; John Elliot
Preceded by John Stanwix; Philip Honywood	Member of Parliament for Appleby; 1767–1772; With: Philip Honywood	Succeeded by Fletcher Norton; Philip Honywood
Preceded by Edward Harvey; John Roberts	Member of Parliament for Harwich; 1772–1774; With: Edward Harvey	Succeeded by Edward Harvey; John Robinson
Preceded by Samuel Martin; William Ashburnham	Member of Parliament for Hastings; 1774–1780; With: The Viscount Palmerston	Succeeded by The Viscount Palmerston; John Ord
Preceded by Grey Cooper; Paul Wentworth	Member of Parliament for Saltash; 1780–1786; With: Grey Cooper 1780–1784; Charles Ambler 1784–1786	Succeeded by Charles Ambler; The Earl of Mornington
Peerage of Great Britain
New creation	Earl of Liverpool; 1796–1808; Member of the House of Lords (1803–1808)	Succeeded by Robert Jenkinson
New creation	Baron Hawkesbury; 1786–1808; Member of the House of Lords (1786–1803)	Succeeded by Robert Jenkinson
Baronetage of England
Preceded by Banks Jenkinson	Baronet of Walcot and Hawkesbury; 1790–1808	Succeeded by Robert Jenkinson
