= George Bisshopp =

Anglican cleric in Ireland, 19th century

Sir George Bisshopp, 9th Baronet (5 July 1791 – 22 March 1834) was Sub-Dean of the Chapel Royal, Dublin from 1816 until 1831, and thereafter and Dean of Lismore from 1831 until 1834.

Sir George was born on 5 July 1791, the only son of Edward Bisshopp, Esq. an eminent army agent (Bisshopp and Brummell of Vine Street, Piccadilly) who was the third son of Sir Cecil Bishopp, 6th Baronet, by the Hon. Anne Boscawen, second daughter of Hugh Boscawen, 1st Viscount Falmouth. His father Edward Bisshopp died in 1792 leaving a "very large fortune". The mother of Sir George was Jane, only daughter of William Atkinson, Esq. of Pall-mall. She was married secondly to the Rev. Lucius Coghlan, D.D. His father having died during his infancy, the charge of his education devolved on his mother's second husband, Dr. Coghlan. On the death of his cousin without living male issue in November 1828 Cecil, Lord De la Zouche, Sir George succeeded to the Baronetcy.

He married, on 17 May 1820, Catherine Elizabeth, daughter of Andrew Sproule, Esq. Capt. R. N. commanding the Royal Yacht at Dublin; and by that lady, who died in 1832, had three sons and three daughters:

- Sir Cecil Augustus Bisshopp, 10th baronet (1821-1849)
- Harriet Arabella, his twin sister;
- Jane-Annabella;
- Sir George-Curzon 11th baronet
- Sir Edward Cecil 12th and last baronet; title extinct on his death.
- Catherine-Mary, married Sir Frederick Francis Maude, mother of Sir Frederick Stanley Maude, conqueror of Baghdad in the First World War.

He was Archdeacon of Aghadoe between 1816 and 1834.

He died aged 42 at Cheltenham 22 March 1834 to which he had gone "for recovery of his health".

== Notes ==
Religious titles
Preceded by John Bayly	Dean of Lismore; 1831–1834	Succeeded by Henry Cotton
Baronetage of England
Preceded by Cecil Bishopp	Baronet (of Parham); 1828–1834	Succeeded by Cecil Bishopp
