= John Bayly (priest, died 1831) =

John Bayly was Dean of Lismore from 1828 until 1831.

He was educated at Trinity College, Dublin. He was Chaplain to Henry Paget, 1st Marquess of Anglesey. He served as Dean of Killaloe from 1808 to 1828, when he was appointed Dean of Lismore.

He died on 24 June 1831.

Religious titles
Preceded by John Scott	Dean of Lismore; 1828–1831	Succeeded by George William Bishopp, 9th Baronet
