= George Sackville, 4th Duke of Dorset =

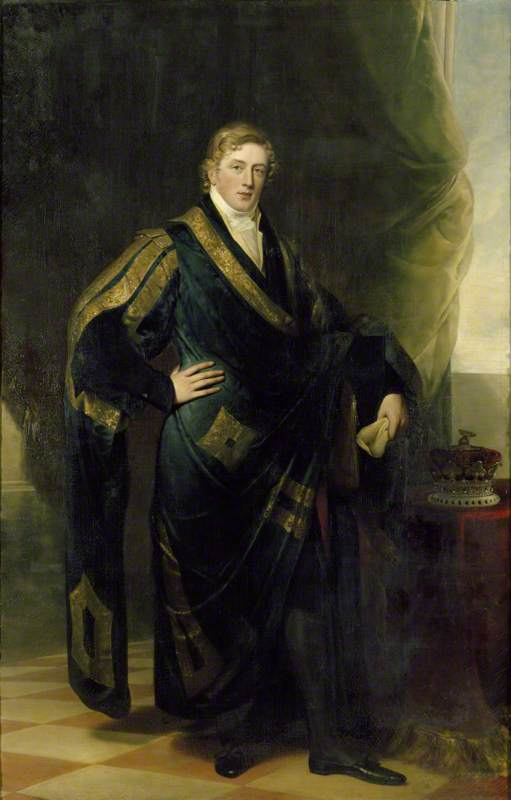
Portrait of Dorset by George Sanders

George John Frederick Sackville, 4th Duke of Dorset (15 November 1793 – 14 February 1815), styled Earl of Middlesex until 1799, was a British militia officer.

== Early life ==
The only son of John Sackville, 3rd Duke of Dorset, and his wife Arabella Diana Cope (a daughter of Sir Charles Cope, Bt.). After his father's death, his mother married Charles Whitworth, 1st Earl Whitworth. He was educated at Harrow and Christ Church, Oxford, receiving an MA from the latter on 30 June 1813.

== Career ==
He was appointed High Steward of Stratford-on-Avon and was commissioned as a captain in the Sevenoaks and Bromley Regiment of Local Militia on 27 April 1813 and on 26 July the same year he was promoted to Lieutenant-Colonel Commandant of the regiment.

== Personal life ==
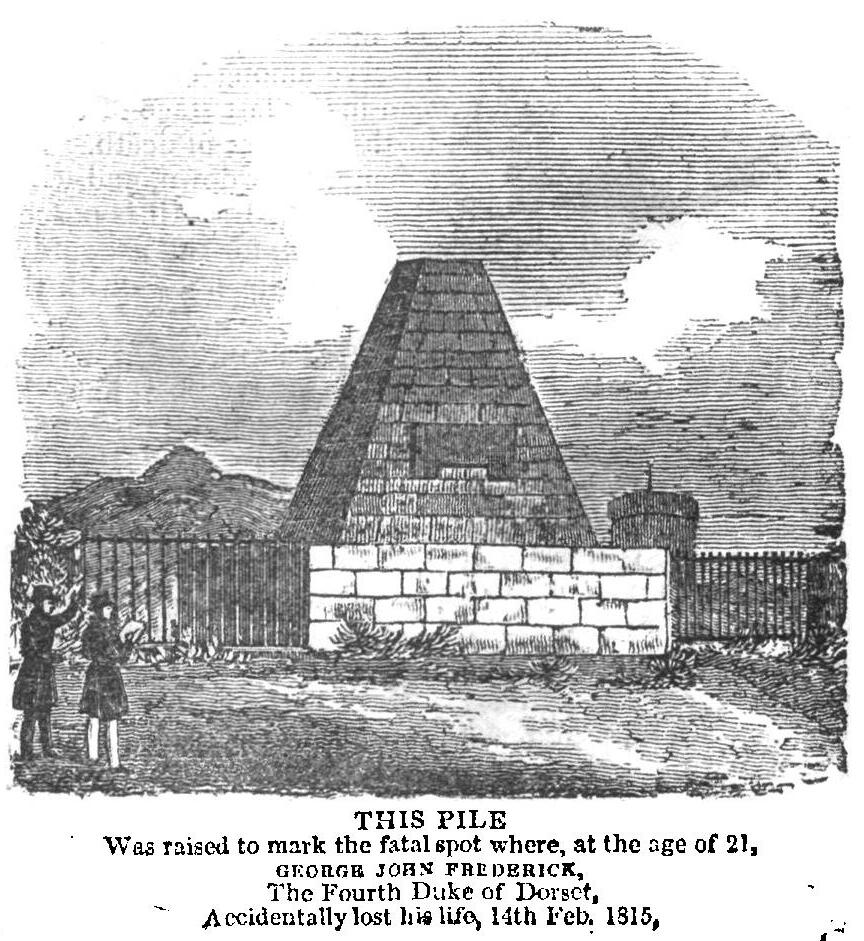
Memorial erected in Killiney

Dorset died in February 1815, of a fall from his horse while hunting on Killiney Hill in County Dublin. An account of this incident, as well as the difficulties that followed an earlier injury to his right eye while playing real tennis, which blighted his career, was published as part of an appreciation of his character in The Gentleman's Magazine for September 1816. He had no children, so he was succeeded as duke by his first cousin once removed, Charles Sackville-Germain. His estate of Knole passed to his sister Elizabeth Sackville-West, Countess De La Warr.

At the time of his death he had just become engaged to Lady Elizabeth Thynne (born 1795), elder daughter of Thomas Thynne, 2nd Marquess of Bath. (She went on to marry Lord Cawdor in October 1816 and have many children).

Peerage of Great Britain
Preceded by John Sackville	Duke of Dorset; 1799–1815	Succeeded by Charles Sackville-Germain
