= Jack Cope (cricketer) =

English footballer and cricketer

John Cope
Personal information
- Full name: John James Cope
- Born: 1 August 1908; Ellesmere Port, Cheshire, England
- Died: 28 January 1995 (aged 86); Brynmawr, Wales
- Height: 5 ft 6 1/2 in (169 cm)
- Batting: Right-handed

Domestic team information
- Years: Team
- 1935: Glamorgan

Career statistics
Competition	FC
Matches	3
Runs scored	27
Batting average	6.75
100s/50s	–/–
Top score	14*
Balls bowled	–
Wickets	–
Bowling average	–
5 wickets in innings	–
10 wickets in match	–
Best bowling	–
Catches/stumpings	–/–
- Source: Cricinfo, 3 July 2010

John James Cope (1 August 1908 – 28 January 1995) was an English cricketer and footballer. Cope was a right-handed batsman. He was born at Ellesmere Port, Cheshire, although he was brought up in Ebbw Vale.

== Cricket career ==
Cope's debut in county cricket came for Monmouthshire in 1931 Minor Counties Championship against Dorset. From 1931 to 1934, he represented the county in 14 Minor Counties fixtures, with his final appearance for Monmouthshire coming against the Kent Second XI.

Cope made his first-class debut for Glamorgan in 1935 against Kent. During the 1935 County Championship, he played 2 further first-class matches for the county against Hampshire and Lancashire. In his 3 first-class matches, he scored 27 runs at a batting average of 6.75, with a high score of 14*.

== Football career ==
Cope was also a footballer. He played initially for Llanelli A.F.C. before signing a professional contract with Bury Town and later Ipswich Town. Cope came close to winning a Welsh cap, when he was chosen to play against the Republic of Ireland, but hours before the match was due to kick-off, the selectors realised he had been born in England and therefore ruled him ineligible. During the Second World War he played a number of friendlies for Cardiff City, where he later took up a coaching role with the club.

== Death ==
Cope died at Brynmawr on 28 January 1995.
