= John Sackville, 3rd Duke of Dorset =

British courtier and diplomat (1745–1799)

His Grace The Duke of Dorset KG
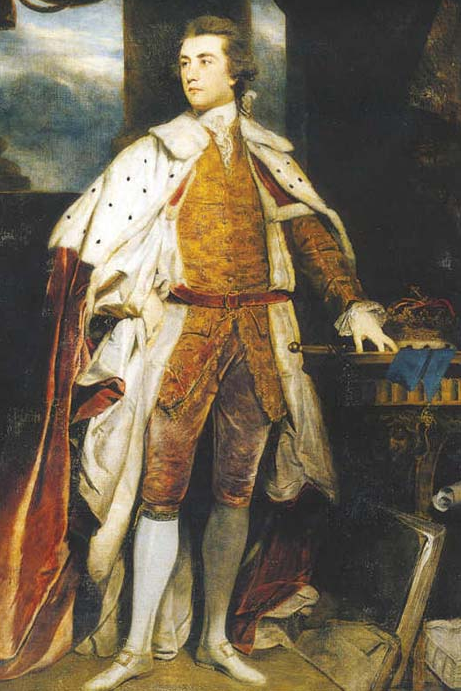
- Portrait by Joshua Reynolds, c. 1767

Captain of the Yeomen of the Guard
- In office 1782 – April 1783
- Monarch: George III
- Prime Minister: The Duke of Portland
- Preceded by: The Viscount Falmouth
- Succeeded by: The Earl of Cholmondeley

Lord Steward of the Household
- In office 1789–1799
- Prime Minister: The Earl of Shelburne
- Preceded by: The Duke of Chandos
- Succeeded by: The Earl of Leicester

Personal details
- Born: 24 March 1745
- Died: 19 July 1799 (aged 54)
- Spouse: Arabella Diana Cope (m. 1790)
- Children: 3 (Mary, George and Elizabeth)
- Parent(s): Lord John Sackville; Lady Frances Leveson-Gower

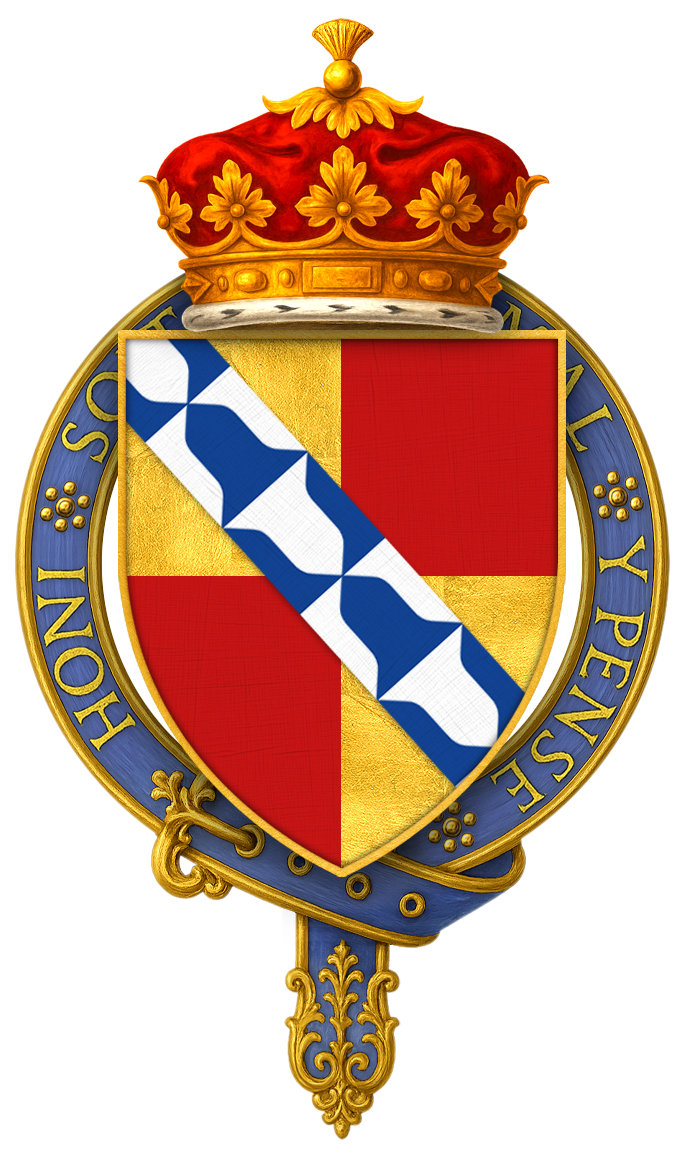
Coat of arms of John Frederick Sackville, 3rd Duke of Dorset, KG

John Frederick Sackville, 3rd Duke of Dorset, KG (25 March 1745 – 19 July 1799) was a British courtier and diplomat. He was the only son of Lord John Philip Sackville, second son of Lionel Sackville, 1st Duke of Dorset. His mother was the former Lady Frances Leveson-Gower. He succeeded to the dukedom in 1769 on the death of his uncle, Charles Sackville, 2nd Duke of Dorset. He was the British Ambassador to France from 1784, and returned to England in August 1789 following the escalation of the French Revolution.

Dorset is remembered for his love of cricket. He was both a good player and an important patron, but his interest was sharpened by gambling, cricket being a major attraction for gamblers throughout the 18th century. His other sporting interests included billiards and tennis. He also acquired a reputation as a womaniser.

== Politics ==
Dorset was returned unopposed as the Member of Parliament for the county of Kent in 1768, sitting until he became the 3rd Duke of Dorset on the death of his uncle in 1769. He was appointed Lord Lieutenant of Kent in 1769, a position he held until 1797. He was Captain of the Yeomen of the Guard in 1783 before going to Paris the next year. After he returned to England, he served as Lord Steward of the Household until his death.

== Cricket ==
Sackville was schooled at Westminster, where he first became a noted proponent of cricket, and gained a reputation as a keen competitor. The Morning Post in 1773 wrote: "The Duke...having run a considerable number of notches from off strokes, the opposing fielders very unpolitely swarmed round his bat so close as to impede his making a full stroke; his Grace gently expostulated with them on this unfair mode, and pointed out their danger, which having no effect, he, with proper spirit made full play at a ball and in so doing brought one of the gentlemen to the ground".

In the same year, Dorset presented the Vine Cricket Ground to the town of Sevenoaks, in return for a rent of 1 peppercorn per year—a literal peppercorn rent. The weatherboard pavilion, now a Grade II listed building, was built in 1850, and the rent was increased to two peppercorns—one for the ground, and one for the pavilion. Sevenoaks Town Council still runs the Vine Cricket Club, though the rent doubled to two peppercorns after the pavilion was built in the 19th century. They must also pay Lord Sackville (if asked) one cricket ball on 21 July each year.

In 1782 the Morning Chronicle noted that "His Grace is one of the few noblemen who endeavour to combine the elegance of modern luxury with the more manly sports of the old English times". Dorset's patronage of cricket was expensive – the Whitehall Evening Post in 1783 noted that the cost to Dorset of maintaining his team, before bets, was £1,000 a year. This was a lot, but less than the amounts some of his contemporaries were spending on racing. The report went on to say that Dorset was unrivalled (among noblemen) "at cricket, tennis and billiards".

The full span of Dorset's cricket career cannot be determined, but he is known to have taken part in at least 28 historically important matches between the 1768 and 1784 seasons. For over twenty years, he ran his own team, the Duke of Dorset's XI, which played in fifteen known matches, mostly against Sir Horatio Mann's XI. Dorset also played for Kent, Hampshire, and England.

In 1784, Dorset moved to Paris to serve as British ambassador to France. His official role was Ambassador Extraordinary and Plenipotentiary. While he was there, he reportedly tried to promote cricket amongst the locals and British expatriates, with The Times noting that horse racing was losing popularity in France, and cricket was, on Dorset's recommendation, taking its place. A cricket match was played by some English gentlemen in the Champs-Elysées: "His Grace of Dorset was, as usual, the most distinguished for skill and activity. The French, however, cannot imitate us in such vigorous exertions of the body, so that we seldom see them enter the lists".

== The French Revolution ==
On 16 July 1789, two days after the Storming of the Bastille, Dorset reported to Secretary of State for Foreign Affairs Francis Osborne, 5th Duke of Leeds: "Thus, my Lord, the greatest revolution that we know anything of has been effected with, comparatively speaking—if the magnitude of the event is acknowledged—the loss of very few lives. From this moment we may consider France as a free country, the King a very limited monarch, and the nobility as reduced to a level with the rest of the nation".

There is no official record of Dorset's recall but he is known to have been in Paris from the beginning of 1789 until 8 August that year when he left on leave and returned to England. He did not return to France and was temporarily replaced by his Embassy Secretary, Lord Robert Stephen FitzGerald (1765–1833; son of James FitzGerald, 1st Duke of Leinster), as Minister Plenipotentiary. New credentials were delivered by Dorset's official successor, Earl Gower, on 20 June 1790. Dorset's credentials were terminated on 29 June 1790.

There is a story about Dorset planning to form a cricket team to visit France in August 1789. His team, said to be captained by William Yalden, reportedly assembled at Dover on 10 August. However, it is said they "met the Duke coming the other way", and the tour was cancelled. According to John Major in More Than A Game, "the whole story is nonsense". Dorset had written to Leeds on 16 July, and had already warned other British residents to leave Paris so, as Major points out, he would hardly have invited a cricket team to come to France at the time of such a crisis.

Back in England, Dorset's public life continued in the post of Steward of the Royal Household.

== Personal life ==
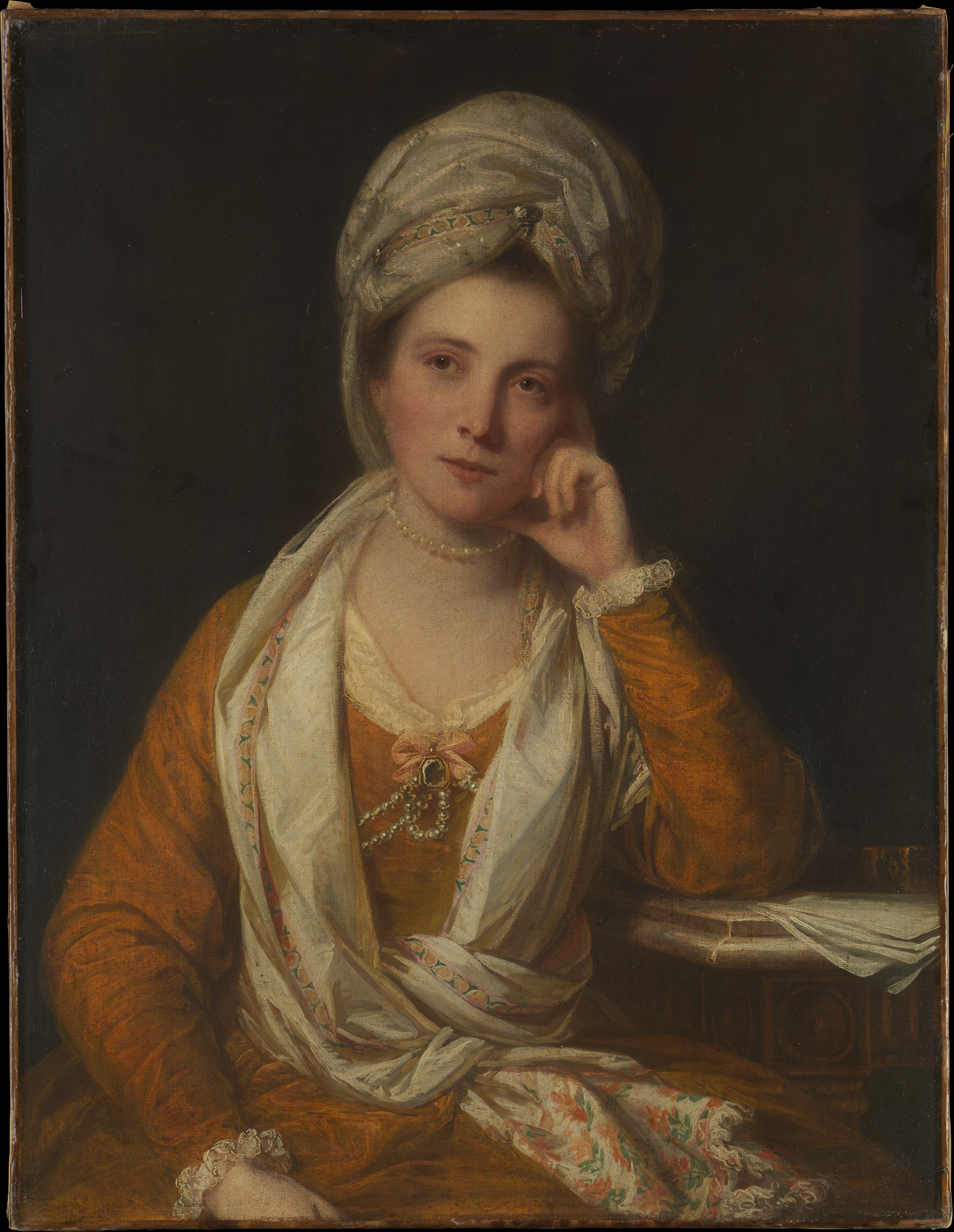
Anne Parsons was about to be the First Minister's wife until she met Dorset

Dorset was a notorious womaniser. He had an affair with Anne Parsons, the influential mistress of Augustus FitzRoy, 3rd Duke of Grafton, then Prime Minister, who had divorced his own wife for adultery and planned to marry Parsons until he discovered her infidelity with Dorset.

Dorset's best-known and most enduring mistress was the Venetian ballerina Giovanna Zanerini, who was the principal ballerina at the King's Theatre, Haymarket, and used the stage name Giovanna Baccelli. Dorset commissioned a painting of her in 1780–81 from Thomas Gainsborough, which is reckoned to be one of Gainsborough's later masterpieces. He also commissioned a painting by Joshua Reynolds and a sculpture showing her nude and prone on a divan and cushions; this is still to be found at Knole. When made Ambassador to France, Dorset even took her to Paris with him, and she danced at the Opera by invitation. (When he was made Knight of the Garter (KG), she wore the blue ribbon of the Garter while dancing.) Dorset and Giovanna had a son together: John Frederick Sackville (1778–1796), who was raised by his father at Paris and Knole after the couple parted in 1789. (Note: This illegitimate son himself fathered an illegitimate son Sackville Sackville who died without issue. Giovanna herself had a relationship with Henry Herbert, 10th Earl of Pembroke (died 1794) until his death, and finally with a Mr James Carey, with whom she remained until her death in 1801. This French blog claims that she married Carey, and that Dorset made her an annuity of 400 pounds.)

The Duke was also known for his affair (c. 1777–1779) with the Countess of Derby, and briefly (c. 1784) with Lady Elizabeth Foster, daughter of Frederick Hervey, 4th Earl of Bristol and mistress of William Cavendish, 5th Duke of Devonshire. The first affair was notable because it did not lead to a divorce. The Countess of Derby was born Lady Elizabeth Hamilton, the only daughter of the 6th Duke of Hamilton and the beauty Elizabeth Gunning. (Note: The young Duke of Dorset, who had just inherited his title, had courted her in 1770 but failed to follow through to a betrothal. In fact, he left for France with his then-mistress Mrs Nancy Horton (Nancy Maynard), formerly mistress of the newly re-married Duke of Grafton. Her mother, now Duchess of Argyll, persuaded her to choose another suitor Edward Smith-Stanley, 12th Earl of Derby who would make a better husband. The couple who married in 1774 produced two children, a son and heir (born 1775) and a daughter Charlotte (c. 1776–1805). By 1777, Dorset had returned from the Continent, and the relationship was revived via Lady Derby's participation in a women's cricket match. At this time, the Earl of Derby began courting the beautiful actress Eliza Farren (later his second wife in 1798), and perhaps this combined with Dorset's personal attractions convinced Lady Betty to succumb to Dorset. Her second daughter Elizabeth Henrietta (born ca 1778–1857) was popularly supposed to be fathered by Dorset; the Earl acknowledged the child, but Lady Derby slipped off to the up-and-coming resort Brighthelmstone which was conveniently near Knole. By 1779, Dorset and the pregnant Lady Derby eloped.) However, the Earl of Derby refused to divorce his errant wife. This meant that Lady Derby was ostracized for the remainder of her life, (Note: Georgian (18th century) social mores were less rigid than Regency or Victorian social mores. Only the Court and the most rigid families refused to receive women who had been divorced and had subsequently married respectably. By 1804, this was beginning to change, when the new Lady Holland was not received after she was divorced and remarried to her lover Lord Holland. However, fashionable men and a few ladies still visited Holland House.) and Dorset soon lost interest and abandoned his lover. He was received back into society, and even received by his former mistress's betrayed husband Lord Derby.

== Marriage and descendants ==
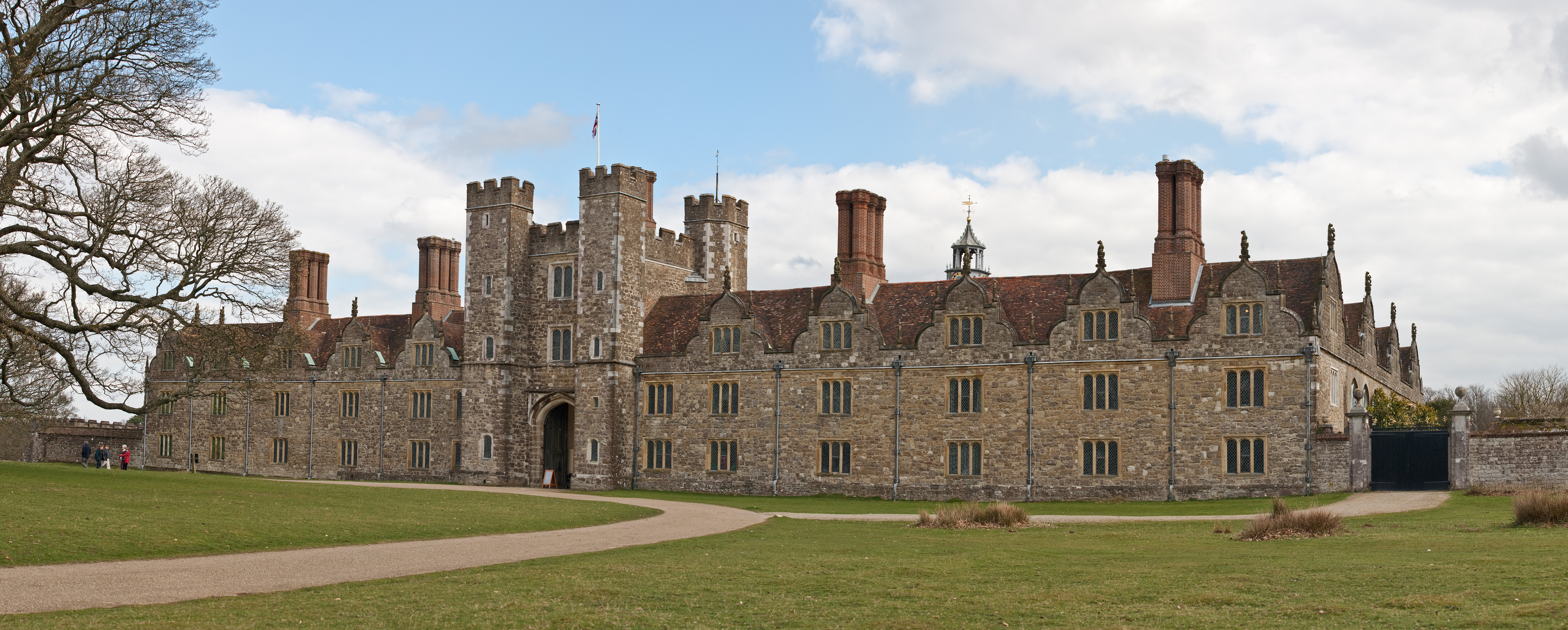
Knole House, near Sevenoaks, Kent

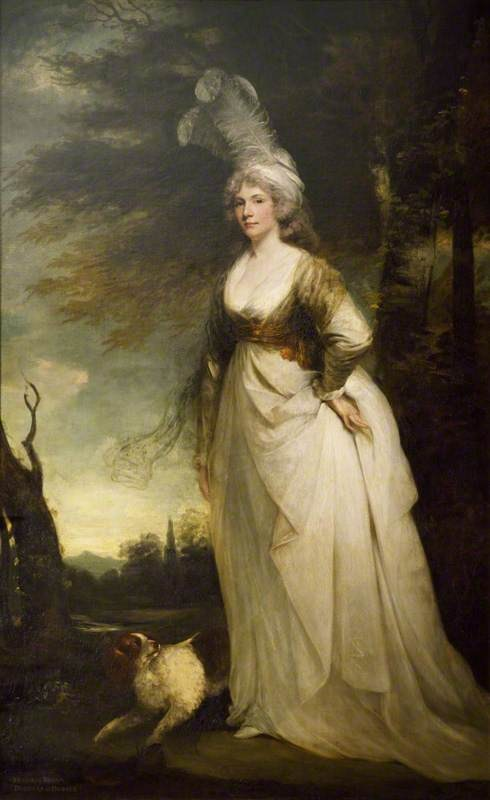
Arabella, Duchess of Dorset by John Hoppner, 1790

In 1790, after returning from France, Dorset married twenty-three-year-old Arabella Diana Cope (1767–1825), daughter and co-heiress of Sir Charles Cope, 2nd Baronet, and stepdaughter of Charles Jenkinson, 1st Earl of Liverpool. (Note: By his first marriage in 1769 to the Anglo-Indian heiress Amelia Watts, he was father of the Prime Minister Lord Liverpool. Her half-brother Charles Jenkinson, 3rd Earl of Liverpool (1784–1851) is the ancestor via his daughter Lady Selina Foljambe and her eldest son of the present Earl of Liverpool) Dorset and Arabella had one son together, George John Frederick, who was born on 15 November 1793, and two daughters, Lady Mary Sackville, born on 30 July 1792, and Lady Elizabeth Sackville, born on 11 August 1795. The Duke died in 1799, aged 54, and left a life interest in his estates and free disposition thereof (in case of the death of their young son) to his wife. At his death, Arabella was thus a very wealthy heiress and from 1799 until her own death in 1825, Arabella, Duchess of Dorset (as she preferred to be known) controlled the Sackville estates and wealth in trust for their son. She remarried his friend, Charles Whitworth, in 1801, who became 1st Earl Whitworth, but had no further issue.

George John Frederick became the 4th Duke of Dorset on his father's death at the family seat, Knole House, near Sevenoaks, Kent at age 6, but spent the rest of his life under the legal and financial control of his mother and stepfather. He died in a riding accident in Ireland, aged 21 having just become engaged to Lady Elizabeth Thynne (born 1795), elder daughter of Thomas Thynne, 2nd Marquess of Bath. (She went on to marry October 1816 Lord Cawdor and have many children). Although the dukedom passed to his cousin Charles, Viscount Sackville, the estates remained at the disposition of Arabella until her own death in 1825, when Knole went to her elder daughter Mary, Countess of Plymouth, and Buckhurst and the Middlesex lands (of the Cranfield family) to her younger daughter Elizabeth, Countess De La Warr.

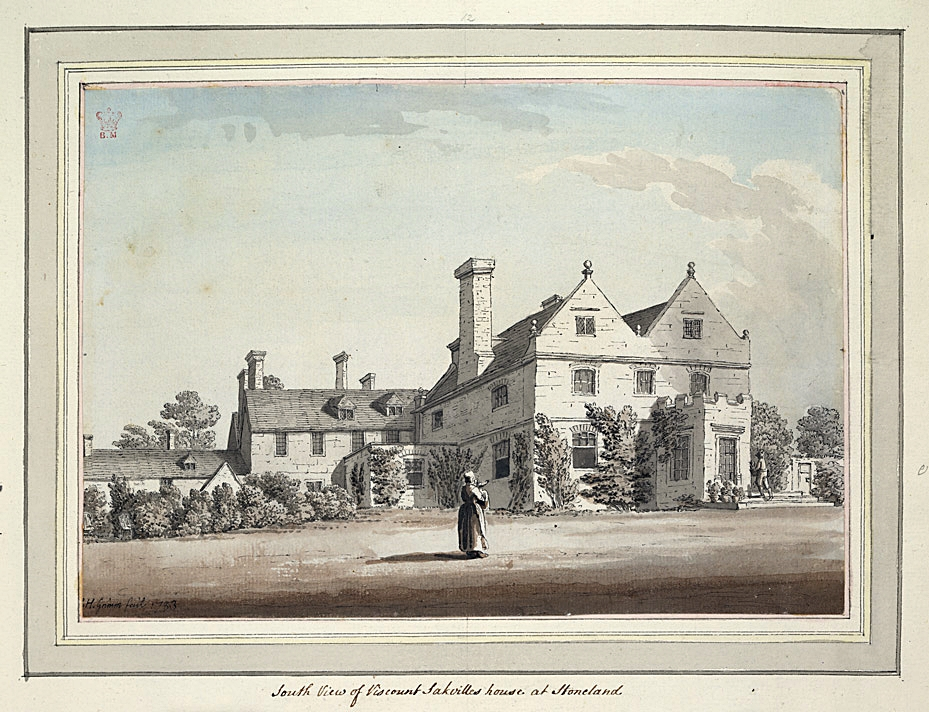
Buckhurst House, Sussex (originally named Stoneland)

Lady Mary Sackville had married firstly Other Windsor, 6th Earl of Plymouth (1789–1833) on 5 August 1811 and secondly her first husband's stepfather William Amherst, 1st Earl Amherst on 25 May 1839. She died childless on 20 July 1864, leaving her estates to her sister Countess De La Warr and her heirs male.

The Countess De La Warr was created Baroness Buckhurst in her own right (a title later inherited by a younger son Reginald, who is ancestor of the present Earl De La Warr). Another line stemming from this lady is that of the Barons Sackville, a title created in compensation for losing the Buckhurst title. The 1st Baron Sackville inherited Knole, according to the will of Mary, Countess of Plymouth. (He died unmarried, as did his brother the 2nd Baron). Their nephew, the 3rd Baron Sackville, was father of the writer Vita Sackville-West who created a garden at Sissinghurst. Knole House, still lived in by the Sackville-West family, and Sissinghurst, the family home of Lord Carnock have both been given to the National Trust.

== Bibliography ==
- Buckley, G. B. (1935). Fresh Light on 18th Century Cricket. Birmingham: Cotterell & Co. OCLC 23450280.
- Buckley, G. B. (1937). Fresh Light on pre-Victorian Cricket. Birmingham: Cotterell & Co. OCLC 23469107.
- Major, John (2007). More Than A Game. London: HarperCollins. ISBN 978-00-07183-64-7 – via Internet Archive.

Political offices
Preceded by The Viscount Falmouth	Captain of the Yeomen of the Guard; 1782–1783	Succeeded by The Earl of Cholmondeley
Preceded by The Duke of Chandos	Lord Steward; 1789–1799	Succeeded by The Earl of Leicester
Diplomatic posts
Preceded by The Duke of Manchester	British Ambassador to France; 1783–1789	Succeeded by Earl Gower
Honorary titles
Preceded by The Duke of Dorset	Lord Lieutenant of Kent; 1769–1797	Succeeded by The Earl of Romney
Peerage of Great Britain
Preceded by Charles Sackville	Duke of Dorset; 1769–1799	Succeeded by George Sackville
