= Sir Jonathan Cope, 1st Baronet =

British landowner and politician

Sir Jonathan Cope, 1st Baronet (c. 1691 – 28 March 1765), was a British landowner and politician who sat in the House of Commons from 1713 to 1722.

== Biography ==
Cope was the eldest son of Jonathan Cope, MP of Ranton Abbey, Staffordshire, and his wife Susan Fowler, daughter of Sir Thomas Fowler, a London goldsmith. He succeeded to the estates of his father in 1694 and his guardians became Sir Thomas Pershall, Sir Robert Jenkinson, 2nd Baronet and Henry Farmer. He was educated at Eton College and matriculated at Christ Church, Oxford, on 18 February 1708 aged 16.

Cope was returned unopposed as a Tory Member of Parliament for Banbury at the 1713. He was created a baronet in the Baronetage of Great Britain on 1 March 1714. At the 1715 general election, he was returned unopposed again for Banbury. In Parliament, he voted against the government in all recorded divisions, and as a Tory, his name was sent to James Francis Edward Stuart, the Jacobite pretender to the British throne, as a potential supporter. In 1721, he inherited the Hanwell estates of Sir John Cope, 5th Baronet of the senior Cope line, which had been disinherited in a family dispute. He did not stand at the 1722 general election and was succeeded at Banbury by his cousin Monoux Cope, of the disinherited line.

Cope married in or before 1717, Mary Jenkinson, the third daughter of Sir Robert Jenkinson, his former guardian, and his wife Sarah Tomlins, the daughter of Thomas Tomlins of Bromley. She was baptised at Charlbury, Oxfordshire, on 10 June 1690, and died at Bath, Somerset, in February 1755. She was buried on 27 February 1755 at Hanwell. They had a son, Jonathan, who predeceased his father, and five daughters.

Cope died at Orton Longueville, Huntingdonshire, on 28 March 1765, and was buried at Hanwell on 4 April 1765. His extensive estate included the ground rent of the London Custom House, for which the Government paid £1,600 a year, on a lease of 99 years. He was succeeded by his grandson, Charles.

Parliament of Great Britain
Preceded by The Hon Charles North	Member of Parliament for Banbury; 1713–1722	Succeeded by Monoux Cope
Baronetage of Great Britain
New creation	Baronet (of Bruern); 1714–1765	Succeeded by Charles Cope
