= Cecil Bisshopp, 12th Baron Zouche =

British baronet

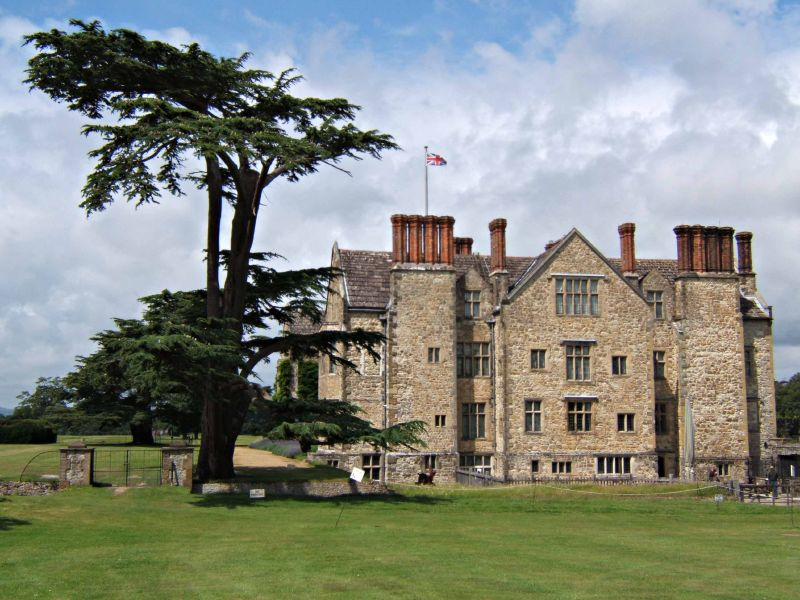
Parham Park House, West Sussex, seat of the Bisshopp Baronets

Cecil Bisshopp, 12th Baron Zouche, FRS (29 December 1752 – 11 November 1828) was a Member of Parliament for New Shoreham who afterwards became the 12th Baron Zouche.

== Life ==
He was the eldest son of Sir Cecil Bisshopp, 7th Baronet of Parham Park, West Sussex and succeeded to the baronetcy on the death of his father in 1779. His mother was Susanna Hedges, daughter of Charles Hedges and Catherine Tate, through whom he claimed the Zouche title. He was awarded a DCL at Oxford University and in 1791 was elected a Fellow of the Royal Society.

He entered Parliament in 1780 as the member for New Shoreham, sitting until 1790, and then again in 1796, sitting until 1806.

In 1795, during the French Revolutionary Wars, he raised the Parham Troop of Sussex Yeomanry. It usually exercised at his estate at Parham Park, drilling in the gallery of the house when the weather was wet.

In 1815 the Barony of Zouche was called out of abeyance in his favour, as the heir of Elizabeth le Zouche, daughter of the eleventh Baron, and he thus became the twelfth Baron Zouche. He married Harriet Anne, the daughter and heiress of William Southwell of Frampton, Gloucestershire and his second wife Arabella Pye, with whom he had 2 sons and 3 daughters. Both sons died before him: the eldest son Lieutenant-Colonel Cecil Bisshopp died in 1813 at age 30 in Ontario, Canada, from wounds received in action against the Americans. The second son, Lieutenant Charles Cecil, Royal Navy, died unmarried in Jamaica in 1808 of yellow fever after the frigate Muros was wrecked whilst endeavouring to destroy some batteries near Havana, Cuba.

Thus on his death in 1828, he was succeeded in the Baronetcy (but not the family estate at Parham) by his cousin George Bisshopp, Dean of Lismore in Ireland, while the Barony of Zouche once again fell into abeyance, this time between his two surviving daughters Hon. Harriet Anne Curzon and Katherine Annabella, Lady Brooke-Pechell. Parham Park passed in trust to Harriett Anne and her husband the Hon. Robert Curzon.

Peerage of England
In abeyance Title last held by Edward la Zouche	Baron Zouche; 1815–1828	In abeyance Title next held by Harriet-Anne Curzon
Baronetage of England
Preceded by Cecil Bishopp	Baronet (of Parham); 1779–1828	Succeeded by George Bisshopp
