= Bishopp baronets =

Extinct baronetcy in the Baronetage of England

The Bishopp Baronetcy, of Parham in the County of Sussex, was a baronetcy in the Baronetage of England. From around 1780 the name was sometimes also spelled Bisshopp. It was created 24 July 1620 for Sir Thomas Bishopp who had previously represented Gatton in Parliament. He was by then almost 70 years old and who had earlier been created a knight by King James I on 7 May 1603 at Theobalds, shortly after James's accession to the throne. Thomas Bishopp was the son of Thomas Bishopp and Elizabeth Belknap, heir and daughter of Sir Edward Belknap, who was active in the service of the English crown, both on the battlefield and as a court official.

The second Baronet sat as Member of Parliament for Steyning and Bramber. The fourth Baronet was Member of Parliament for Bramber. The sixth Baronet represented Penrhyn and Boroughbridge in Parliament. The eighth Baronet was Member of Parliament for New Shoreham. In 1815 the abeyance of the ancient Barony of Zouche was terminated in his favour, as a descendant through his mother from the Honourable Elizabeth la Zouche, eldest daughter of Edward la Zouche, 11th Baron Zouche, on whose death in 1625 the barony had fallen into abeyance. However, on Lord Zouche's death in 1828 the Barony once again fell into abeyance while he was succeeded in the baronetcy (but not the family estate at Parham) by his cousin. The title became extinct on the death of the twelfth Baronet in 1870.

The second son of the first Baronet Henry Bishopp, (1611–1691), was a Postmaster General of England and inventor of the first postmark used on mail.

== Bishopp baronets, of Parham (1620) ==
Escutcheon of the Bishopp baronets of Parham

- Sir Thomas Bishopp, 1st Baronet (c. 1550–1626)
- Sir Edward Bishopp, 2nd Baronet (c. 1601–1649)
- Sir Thomas Bishopp, 3rd Baronet (1627–1652)
- Sir Cecil Bishopp, 4th Baronet (c. 1635–1705)
- Sir Cecil Bishopp, 5th Baronet (d. 1725)
- Sir Cecil Bishopp, 6th Baronet (1700–1778)
- Sir Cecil Bishopp, 7th Baronet (d. 1779)
- Sir Cecil Bisshopp, 8th Baronet (1753–1828) (became Baron Zouche in 1815)
- Sir George William Bisshopp, 9th Baronet (1792–1834) 1st cousin of the 8th Baronet and grandson of 6th Baronet
- Sir Cecil Augustus Bisshopp, 10th Baronet (6 July 1821 – 19 January 1849) was the son of the 9th baronet and married Mary Ann, the eldest daughter of Rear-Admiral Sir James Hillyar, in January 1843. They had a son Cecil Augustus Hillyar Bisshopp who died 5 May 1845, aged 6 months and was buried in the Protestant cemetery in Jerusalem. Sir Cecil was ordained in Malta by the Bishop of Gibraltar in 1844. In the Summer of 1845 Bisshopp was instituted as a clergyman at Charles Church, Plymouth. In December 1846 his frail health forced him to resign his vicarage, proceeding to Malta. His tomb (made of Italian marble) is located in the Msida Bastion Historic Garden, in Floriana, Malta. His wife was pregnant when he died and the following month gave birth to a daughter, Mary Cecil Augusta Bisshopp. His widow remarried in 1857 to Walter Long.
- Sir George Curzon Bisshopp, 11th Baronet (10 Apr 1823 – 15 Dec 1865), brother of 10th Baronet
- Sir Edward Cecil Bisshopp, 12th Baronet (23 Feb 1826 – 27 Jan 1870), brother of 11th Baronet

== See also ==
- Baron Zouche
