= Jonathan Goddard =

English physician

Jonathan Goddard (1617–1675) was an English physician, known both as army surgeon to the forces of Oliver Cromwell, and as an active member of the Royal Society. He is known for "Goddard's Drops," a popular medicine whose ingredients included dried viper and human skulls. Users of the drops included the MP Edward Walpole, who died after consuming them, and Charles II.

== Life ==
The son of a wealthy shipbuilder, Goddard was a student at the Magdalen Hall, Oxford, he qualified in medicine at the University of Cambridge. He joined the College of Physicians in 1643, and became physician to Charles I of England when he was held captive by Parliament. In the 1650s he was made Warden of Merton College, Oxford (1651), and was one of the 'Oxford club' group around John Wilkins. He was also a Member of Parliament for Oxfordshire in the Barebone's Parliament of 1653. He became Professor of Physic at Gresham College in 1655. He performed some experiments here with chemist Johannes Banfi Hunyades that constitute the first extant example of temperature measurement in distillation.

He was one of five doctors attending Cromwell when he died (the others being George Bate, John Bathurst, Thomas Trapham and Laurence Wright).

On the English Restoration of 1660, he lost his position at Merton. But his early position in the Royal Society was solid (he became a founding Fellow in November, 1660), and indeed at the beginning of 1661, when the Society was homeless and moved to Gresham College, it met in his lodgings.

He was buried in the chancel of Great St Helens church, London.

== Notes ==
Academic offices
Preceded by Nathaniel Brent	Warden of Merton College, Oxford; 1651–1660	Succeeded by Edward Reynolds
Parliament of England
Preceded by (1640–1648); James Fiennes; Thomas Wenman	Member of Parliament for Oxfordshire; 1653–1653; With: Sir Charles Wolseley; William Draper	Succeeded by Charles Fleetwood; Nathaniel Fiennes; William Lenthall; Sir Robert Jenkinson; James Whitelocke
