= Nathaniel Fiennes =

17th-century English politician and religious radical (1608–1669)

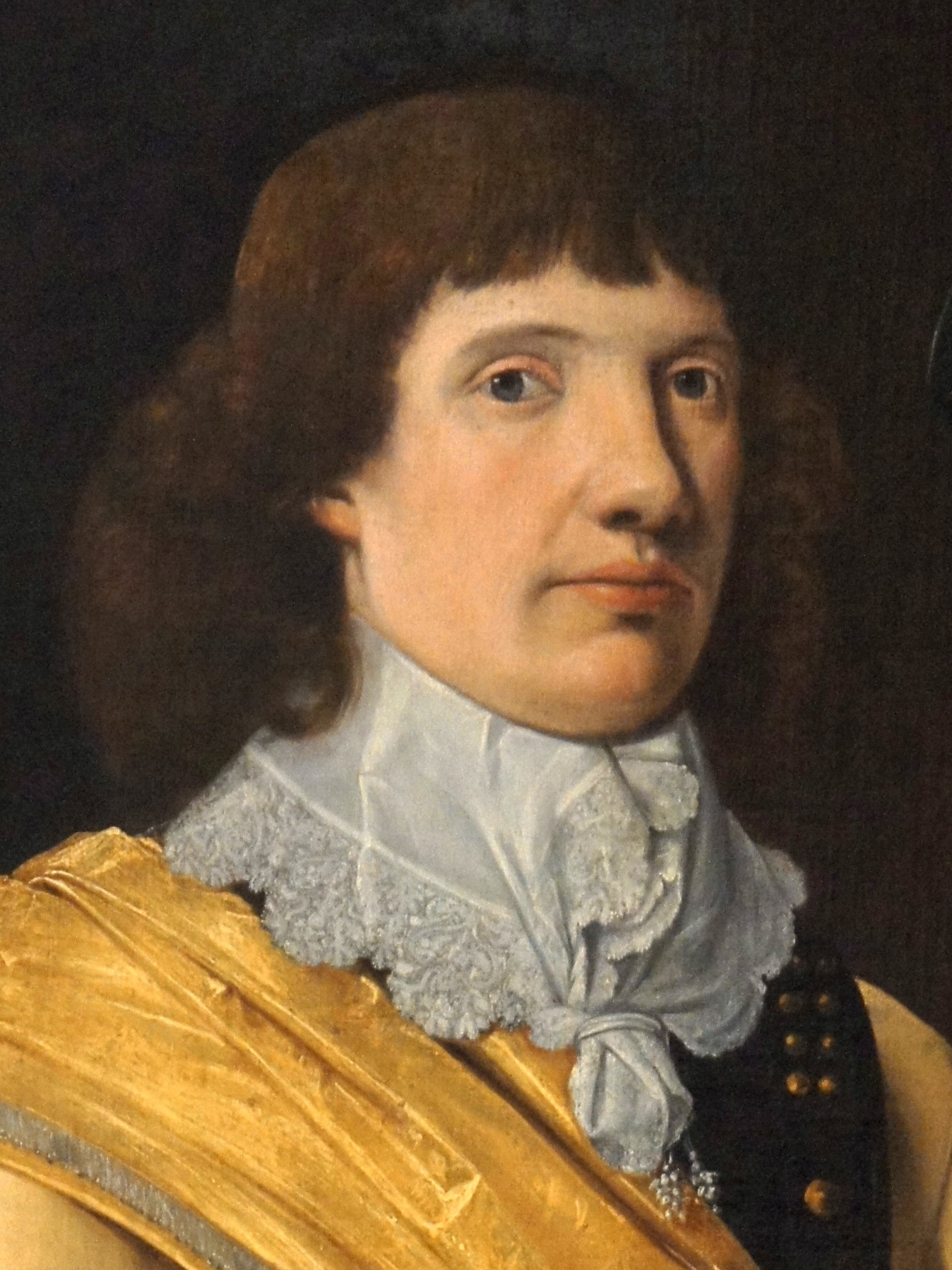
- Nathaniel Fiennes c. 1640

Member of Parliament for Oxford University
- In office September 1656 – February 1658

Lord Keeper of the Great Seal
- In office June 1655 – April 1659

Member of Parliament for Oxfordshire
- In office September 1654 – January 1655

Parliamentarian Governor of Bristol
- In office May 1643 – July 1643

Member of Parliament for Banbury
- In office April 1640 – December 1648 (Fiennes excluded by Pride's Purge)

Personal details
- Born: c. 1608 Broughton Castle, Oxfordshire
- Died: 16 December 1669 (aged 61) Newton Tony, Wiltshire
- Spouses: (1) Elizabeth Eliot (m. 1636); (2) Frances Whitehead (m. 1650)
- Children: (1) Nathaniel (1637–1672); William (1639–1698) (2) Anne; Frances; Celia (1662–1741); Mary (1663–1737)
- Education: New College, Oxford
- Occupation: Religious radical, peer and politician

Military service
- Allegiance: Parliamentarian
- Rank: Colonel
- Battles/wars: First English Civil War; Powick Bridge; Edgehill; Storming of Bristol

Nathaniel Fiennes, c. 1608 to 16 December 1669, was a younger son of the Puritan nobleman and politician, William Fiennes, 1st Viscount Saye and Sele. He sat in the House of Commons at various times between 1640 and 1659, and served with the Parliamentarian army in the First English Civil War. In 1643, he was dismissed from the army for alleged incompetence after surrendering Bristol and sentenced to death before being pardoned. Exonerated in 1645, he actively supported Oliver Cromwell during The Protectorate, being Lord Keeper of the Great Seal from 1655 to 1659.

Elected to the Long Parliament in November 1640, Fiennes played a leading role in the opposition to Charles I prior to the outbreak of civil war in August 1642. In the early years of the war, his objections to any form of established church aligned him with Cromwell and the Independents, rather than the moderate Presbyterians who dominated Parliament. However, his belief in a balanced political solution meant that after Parliament's victory in 1646, he supported a compromise peace settlement with Charles I. As a result, he was one of the MPs excluded by Pride's Purge in December 1648 along with his younger brother John Fiennes, and played no part in the Execution of Charles I.

Fiennes re-entered politics when Cromwell became Lord Protector in 1653, sitting as an MP in the Second and Third Protectorate Parliaments, as well as being made Lord Keeper of the Great Seal in June 1655. After Cromwell died in September 1658, he backed the succession of his son Richard Cromwell as Lord Protector, but lost office when the latter resigned in April 1659. Following the 1660 Stuart Restoration, he was pardoned under the Indemnity and Oblivion Act, and lived quietly at home in Newton Tony, Wiltshire, until his death on 16 December 1669.

== Personal details ==
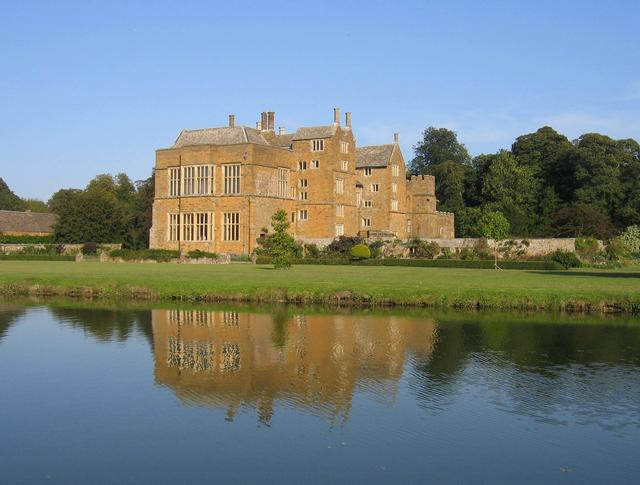
Family home, Broughton Castle

Nathaniel Fiennes was born c. 1608 at Broughton Castle, Oxfordshire, second son of William Fiennes, 1st Viscount Saye and Sele (1582–1662), and Elizabeth Temple (died 1648). Siblings included his elder brother James (1602–1674), Bridget, John (1612–1708), Constance and Elizabeth.

He was twice married, the first time in August 1636 to Elizabeth Eliot (1616–1648?), daughter of Sir John Eliot, an MP who played a leading role in passing the 1628 Petition of Right; he was later imprisoned by Charles I in the Tower of London, where he died in 1632. They had two surviving sons, Nathaniel (1637–1672), who inherited his fathers' estates, and William (1639–1698), who succeeded his uncle James as Third Viscount Saye and Sele in 1674.

Elizabeth died sometime before 1650 when Fiennes married again, this time to Frances Whitehead (1621–1691). They had four daughters, Anne, Frances, Mary (1663–1737) and Celia (1662–1741), later well known for a series of books recording her travels around Britain.

== Career ==
Fiennes attended Winchester College, then entered New College, Oxford in 1619. He graduated in 1624 without a degree, but was made a perpetual fellow of the college as "founder's kin". (Note: There is some debate as to whether he was entitled to this) Like his Puritan father, he strongly opposed Laudianism and Episcopacy in any form, opinions strengthened by his residence in the Calvinist stronghold of Geneva.

He returned to Scotland in 1639, and established communications with the Covenanters and the Opposition in England. As Member of Parliament for Banbury in both the Short and Long Parliaments he took a prominent part in the attacks upon the church.

He spoke against the illegal canons on 14 December 1640, and again on 9 February 1641 on the occasion of the reception of the Root and Branch petition, when he argued against episcopacy as constituting a political as well as a religious danger and made an impression on the House of Commons, his name being added immediately to the committee appointed to deal with church affairs.

He took a leading part in the examination into the army plot; was one of the commissioners appointed to attend the king to Scotland in August 1641; and was nominated one of the committee of safety in July 1642. On the outbreak of hostilities he took arms immediately, commanded a troop of horse in the army of Lord Essex, was present at the relief of Coventry in August, and at the fight at Powick Bridge, Worcester in September, where he distinguished himself, and subsequently at Edgehill. Of the last two engagements he wrote accounts, viz. True and Exact Relation of both the Battles fought by ... Earl of Essex against the Bloudy Cavaliers (1642). (See also A Narrative of the Late Battle before Worcester taken by a Gentleman of the Inns of Court from the mouth of Master Fiennes, 1642).

In February 1643, Fiennes was sent down to Bristol, arrested Colonel Thomas Essex the governor, executed the two leaders of a plot (Robert Yeamans and George Bouchier) to deliver up the city, and received a commission himself as governor on 1 May 1643. On the arrival, however, of Prince Rupert on 22 July, although the place was in no condition to resist an attack, Fiennes held out until Rupert's troops had forced an entry into the city and further resistance was both hopeless and a waste of life. He addressed to Essex a letter in his defence (Thomason Tracts E. 65, 26), drew up for the parliament a Relation concerning the Surrender ... (1643), answered by William Prynne and Clement Walker accusing him of treachery and cowardice, to which he opposed Col. Fiennes his Reply .... Dorothy Hazzard a local preacher gave evidence against him.

He was tried at St Albans by the council of war in December, was pronounced guilty of having surrendered the place improperly, and sentenced to death. He was, however, pardoned, and the facility with which Bristol subsequently capitulated to the parliamentary army induced Cromwell and the generals to exonerate him completely. His military career nevertheless came to an end. He went abroad, and it was some time before he reappeared on the political scene.

There has been debate over the legitimacy of the indictments brought against him by Walker and Prynne. Both had lost considerable amounts of money and property in the fall of Bristol and both were politically opposed to Fiennes and his family. Many of the witnesses at the trial could possibly have been politically motivated and there is some evidence Fiennes was the victim of a wider political campaign against his family's political faction. After Bristol was recaptured in 1645, it became clear the problems he faced in 1643 had not been exaggerated, and he was restored as an MP.

In September 1647, he was included in the army committee, and on 3 January he became a member of the committee of safety. He was, however, in favour of accepting the King's terms at Newport in December, and in consequence was excluded from the House by Pride's Purge. An opponent of church government in any form, he was opposed to the Presbyterianism of the day, and inclined to Independency and Cromwell's party. He was a member of the council of state in 1654, and in June 1655 he received the appointment of commissioner for the custody of the great seal, for which he was poorly suited.

In the First Protectorate Parliament of 1654 he was returned for Oxfordshire and in the Second Protectorate Parliament of 1656 for Oxford University. In January 1658 he was included in Cromwell's House of Lords. He was in favour of the Protector's assumption of the royal title and urged his acceptance of it on several occasions. His public career closes with addresses delivered in his capacity as chief commissioner of the great seal at the beginning of the sessions of 20 January 1658, and 2 January 1659, in which the religious basis of Cromwell's government is especially insisted upon, the feature to which Fiennes throughout his career had attached most value. He lived at No. 1 Great Piazza, Covent Garden from 1657 to 1659.

On the reassembling of the Long Parliament he was superseded; he took no part in the Restoration, and died at Newton Tony in Wiltshire on 16 December 1669.

== Works ==
Besides the pamphlets already cited, a number of his speeches and other political tracts were published (see Gen. Catalogue, British Museum). Wood also attributed to him Monarchy Asserted (1660) (reprinted in Somers Tracts, vi. 346 ), but there seems no reason to ascribe to him with Clement Walker the authorship of Joshua Sprigge's Anglia Rediviva.

== Sources ==
- Firth, C.H.; Rait, R.S., eds. (1911). "February 1643: Ordinance for Mr. Fiennes to raise a Regiment of Horse in Gloucestershire, &c., to seize Delinquents' Horses there". Acts and Ordinances of the Interregnum, 1642–1660. pp. 84–5.
- Gentles, Ian (1992). The New Model Army in England, Ireland and Scotland, 1645 to 1653 (2009 ed.). Wiley Publishing. ISBN 978-0631193470.
- Russell, Conrad (2004). "Eliot, Sir John (1592–1632)". Oxford Dictionary of National Biography (online ed.). Oxford University Press. doi:10.1093/ref:odnb/8630. (Subscription, Wikipedia Library access or UK public library membership required.)
- Salmon, Thomas (1730). "Chapter XL. The Trial of Colonel Nathanael Fiennes before a Council of War at St. Albans, for cowardly surrendring the City and Castle of Bristol, the 14th of December 1643. 19 Car. I. Taken out of the Account given thereof by Mr, Prynn and Mr. Walker.". In Emlyn, Sollom (ed.). A complete collection of state-trials, and proceedings for high-treason, and other crimes and misdemeanours: from the reign of King Richard II. to the end of the reign of King George I. With two alphabetical tables to the whole. Vol. 1 (2 ed.). J. Walthoe senior. p. 745–794.
- Schwarz, Marc (2004). "Fiennes, Nathaniel (1607/8–1669)". Oxford Dictionary of National Biography (online ed.). Oxford University Press. doi:10.1093/ref:odnb/9413. (Subscription, Wikipedia Library access or UK public library membership required.)

=== Attribution ===
Parliament of England
| Parliament suspended since 1629 | Member of Parliament for Banbury; 1640–1648 | Not represented in Rump Parliament |
| Preceded by Sir Charles Wolseley; William Draper; Dr Jonathan Goddard | Member of Parliament for Oxfordshire; 1654; With: Robert Jenkinson; Charles Fleetwood; Colonel James Whitelocke; William Lenthall | Succeeded by Robert Jenkinson; Lord Deputy Charles Fleetwood; William Lenthall; Miles Fleetwood; Sir Francis Norreys |
| Preceded by Dr John Owen | Member of Parliament for Oxford University; 1656 | Succeeded by Matthew Hale; John Mylles |
