= First English Civil War =

Part of the Wars of the Three Kingdoms (1642–1646)

- Part of the Wars of the Three Kingdoms and English Civil War
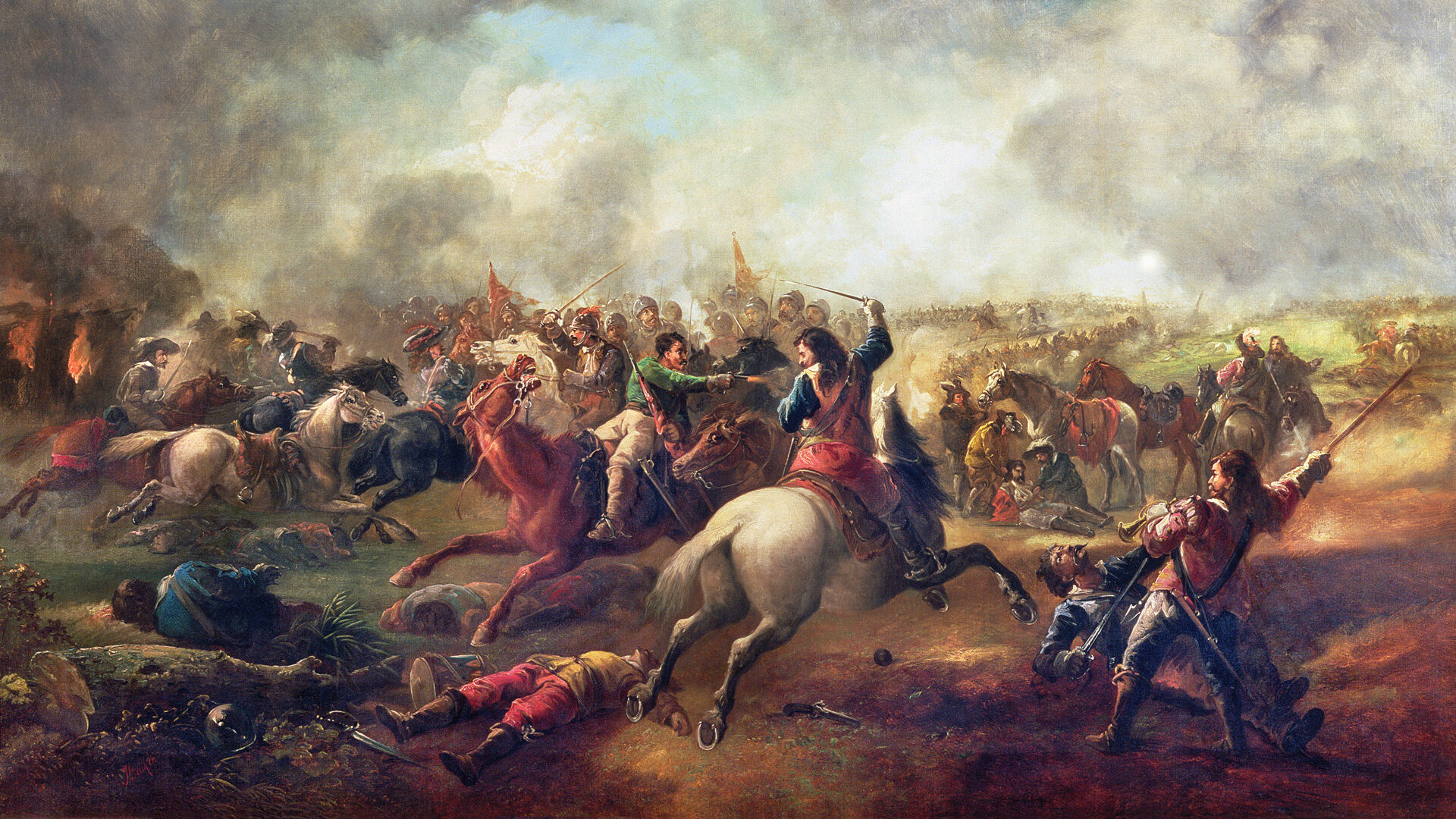
- The Battle of Marston Moor, a major battle of the war
Date	1642–1646
Location	England and Wales
Result	Parliamentarian-Covenanter victory

Belligerents
Royalists	(Kingdom of England) Parliamentarians; Scottish Covenanters

Commanders and leaders
Charles I; Prince Rupert; Lord Astley; Lord Goring; Sir Ralph Hopton; Lord Newcastle; Prince Maurice	Sir Thomas Fairfax; Oliver Cromwell; Phillip Skippon; Earl of Manchester; Earl of Essex; Sir William Waller; Earl of Leven

Casualties and losses
33,952 dead; 56,367 captured	27,972 dead; 21,191 captured

The First English Civil War took place in England and Wales from 1642 to 1646, and forms part of the 1639 to 1653 Wars of the Three Kingdoms. (Note: These also include the 1639 and 1640 Bishops' Wars, the 1641 to 1653 Irish Confederate Wars, the 1648 Second English Civil War, the 1650 to 1652 Anglo-Scottish War, and 1649 to 1653 Cromwellian conquest of Ireland) An estimated 15% to 20% of adult males in England and Wales served in the military at some point between 1639 and 1653, while around 4% of the total population died from war-related causes. (Note: The equivalent figure for losses incurred during the 1914 to 1918 World War I was 2.23%) These figures illustrate the widespread impact of the conflict on society, and the bitterness it engendered as a result.

Conflict over the role of Parliament and religious practice dated from the accession of James VI and I in 1603. These tensions culminated in the imposition of Personal Rule in 1629 by his son, Charles I, who recalled Parliament in April and November 1640. He hoped by doing so to obtain funding that would enable him to reverse his defeat by Scots Covenanters in the Bishops' Wars, but in return Parliament demanded a greater share in government than he was willing to concede.

In its early stages, the vast majority on both sides supported the institution of monarchy but disagreed on who held ultimate authority. Royalists generally argued both Parliament and the Church of England were subordinate to the king, while most of their Parliamentarian opponents claimed his supremacy did not extend to religion, and wanted a form of constitutional monarchy. When it came to choosing sides, however, individual choices were heavily influenced by religious belief or personal loyalty. Horrified at the devastation inflicted on Europe by the Thirty Years' War, many tried to remain neutral, or took up arms with great reluctance.

When fighting began in August 1642, both sides believed it would be settled by a single battle, but it soon became clear this was not the case. Royalist successes in 1643 led to an alliance between Parliament and the Scots, who won a series of battles in 1644, the most significant being the Battle of Marston Moor. Alleged failures to exploit these successes led Parliament in February 1645 to set up the New Model Army, the first centrally funded and professional military force in England, whose success at Naseby in June 1645 proved decisive. The war ended with victory for the Parliamentarian alliance in June 1646 and Charles in custody. However, his refusal to agree to concessions, combined with divisions among his opponents, led to the Second English Civil War in 1648, followed by his execution in January 1649.

== Overview ==
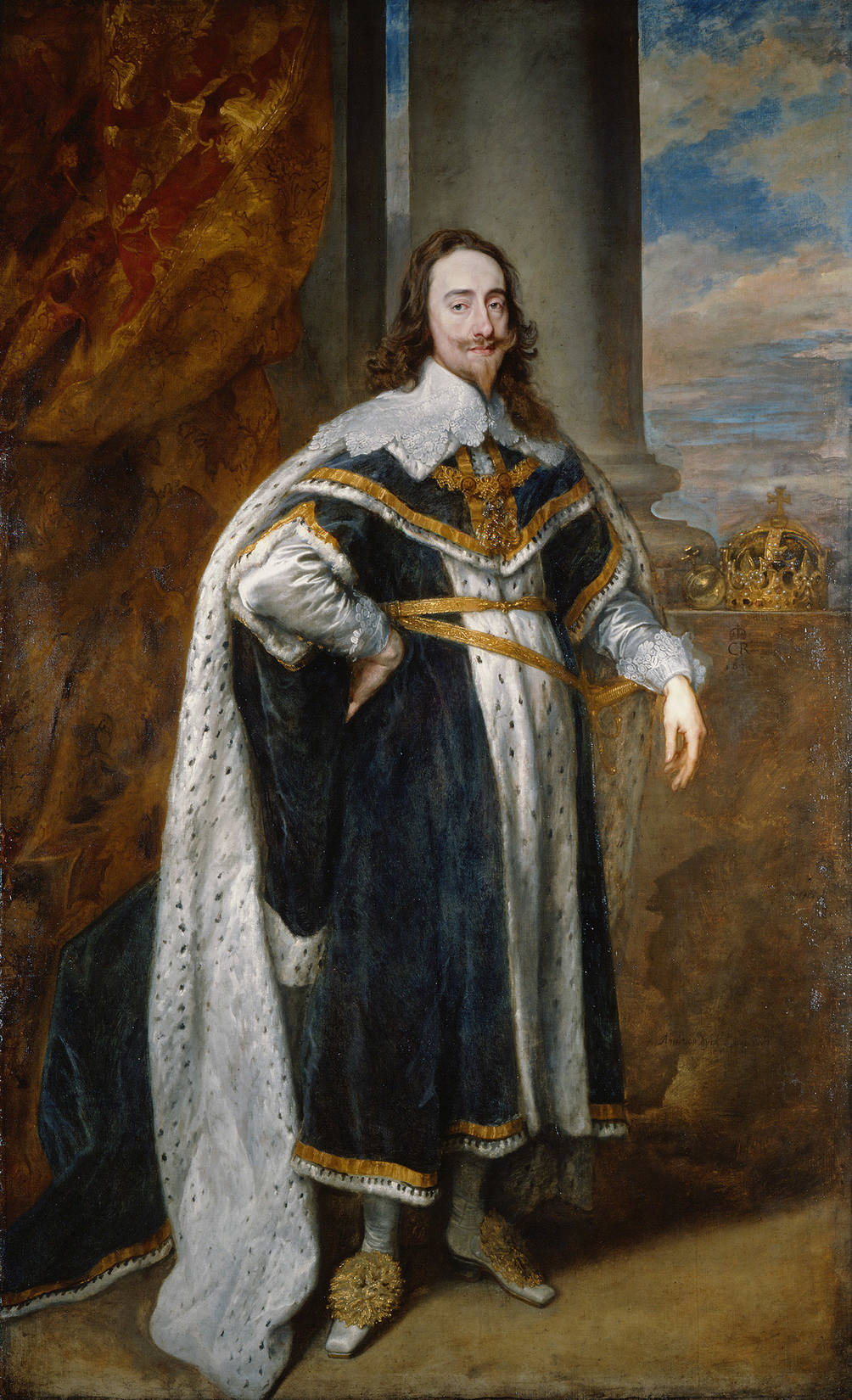
Charles I of England, c. 1636

The First English Civil War forms part of the 1639 to 1653 Wars of the Three Kingdoms, fought in England and Wales, and the separate kingdoms of Scotland and Ireland. (Note: Some historians, such as Trevor Royle, suggest 1638 to 1660) Others include the 1639 and 1640 Bishops' Wars, 1641 to 1653 Irish Confederate Wars, 1648 Second English Civil War, 1649 to 1653 Cromwellian conquest of Ireland, and 1650 to 1652 Anglo-Scottish War, previously known as the Third English Civil War. The First and Second English Civil Wars are sometimes grouped together as the 1642 to 1648 English Civil War.

The underlying cause of the war in England was a long-running struggle for political and religious control between the monarchy and Parliament that began when James VI and I became king in 1603. The issues resurfaced after the 1660 Stuart Restoration, and were arguably only resolved by the 1688 Glorious Revolution. American historians like Kevin Phillips have identified many similarities between the principles at stake in 1642 and those leading to the American Revolution.

== Royalist or Parliamentarian ==
A simple division of the opposing parties into Royalist Cavaliers and Parliamentarian Roundheads is a perspective now accepted as outdated, but one which arguably still informs modern perceptions. In reality, individual motives for choosing a side were complex, and many either remained neutral or participated with extreme reluctance, while others fought on both sides at different points. Historian Tim Harris suggests that by 1640, most agreed Personal Rule had usurped the role of Parliament. It was only the submission of the Grand Remonstrance in late 1641 that led moderates like Edward Hyde to create a Royalist political faction, arguing Parliament was going too far the other way.

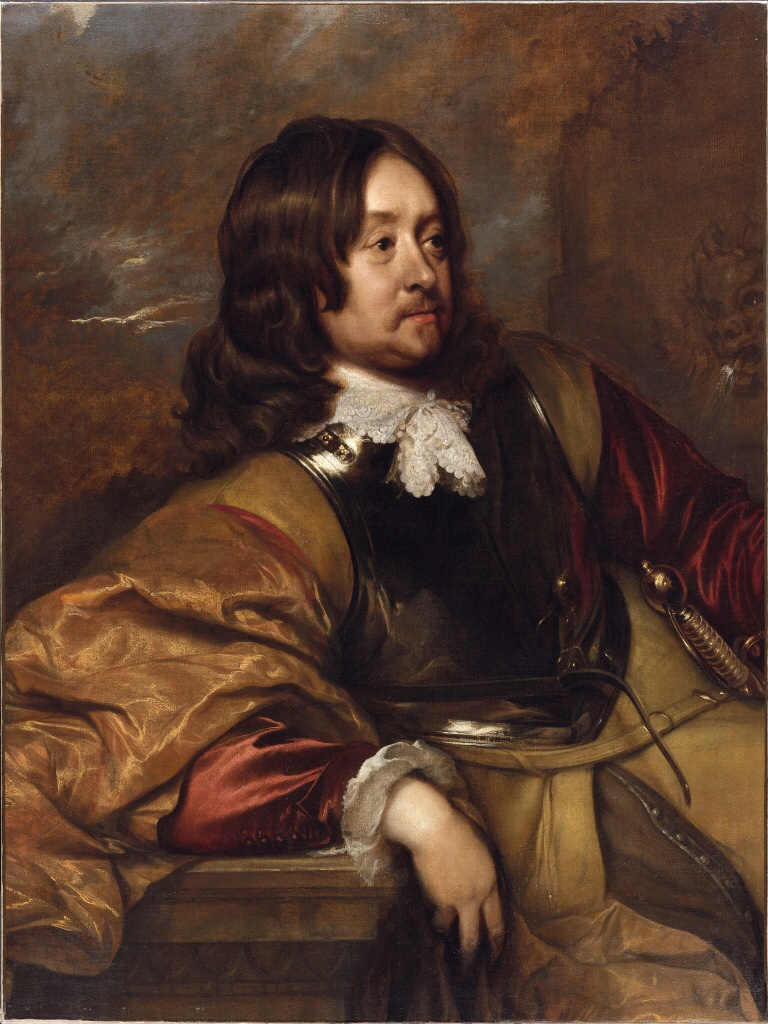
Edward Hyde, later Earl of Clarendon, c. 1643; originally part of the Parliamentary opposition, in 1642 he became Charles' chief advisor

Both sides claimed they were seeking to restore the "ancient constitution". For the vast majority of Parliamentarians, and even some Royalists, Stuart concepts of the divine right of kings and absolutism introduced by James VI and I in 1603 were "innovations" that had undermined "traditional" English freedoms and rights. However, not everyone agreed on the exact nature of these "rights", or if restoring them was even desirable, which led to divisions within Parliament as the war progressed.

Most Parliamentarians went to war in 1642 not to depose the king but to regulate his powers, while only a tiny minority sought to abolish the monarchy altogether. (Note: Henry Marten is the only member of the Long Parliament who can be identified as a republican prior to 1642, and was jailed by Parliament in 1643 for arguing the monarchy should be abolished) John Pym, Parliamentarian leader in the Commons, was one of the few who believed removing Charles might be the only option, since experience showed the king would not keep commitments he considered forced on him. This went back to his annulment of the Petition of Right in 1628, and more recently during the Bishops' Wars, when he agreed peace terms in 1639 while planning another military campaign in 1640. In addition, he and his wife Henrietta Maria openly told foreign ambassadors any concessions to Parliament would be retrieved by force.

Charles' credibility mattered because regardless of religion, the vast majority in all three kingdoms believed a 'well-ordered' monarchy was divinely mandated. His opponents argued if the king would neither obey his own laws, nor keep his promises, it presented a fundamental threat to the state which required either forcing him to do so, or deposing him. Where they disagreed was what 'well-ordered' meant, particularly in terms of the role of Parliament, and control of the church. Both issues were linked, because in the 17th century 'true religion' and 'good government' were seen as mutually dependent. In general, most Royalists supported a Church of England governed by bishops, appointed by and answerable to, the king, while many Parliamentarians advocated a Calvinist system of church leadership, without bishops or royal influence.

While "Roundhead" is often viewed as interchangeable with "Puritan", this term applies to anyone who wanted to "purify" the Church of England of "Papist" practices and thus covers a wide range of views. Although the majority supported Parliament, some prominent Puritans like Sir William Savile backed Charles out of personal loyalty. Conversely, many Royalists objected to Laudianism, and opposed the appointment of Catholics to senior positions, while attempts to integrate Irish Catholic troops in 1643 caused some regiments to mutiny. Parliamentarians were divided between Presbyterians like Pym who wanted to reform the Church of England, and religious Independents who rejected any form of established church and wanted it abolished. They included Congregationalists like Cromwell and Baptists, who were especially well represented in the New Model Army.

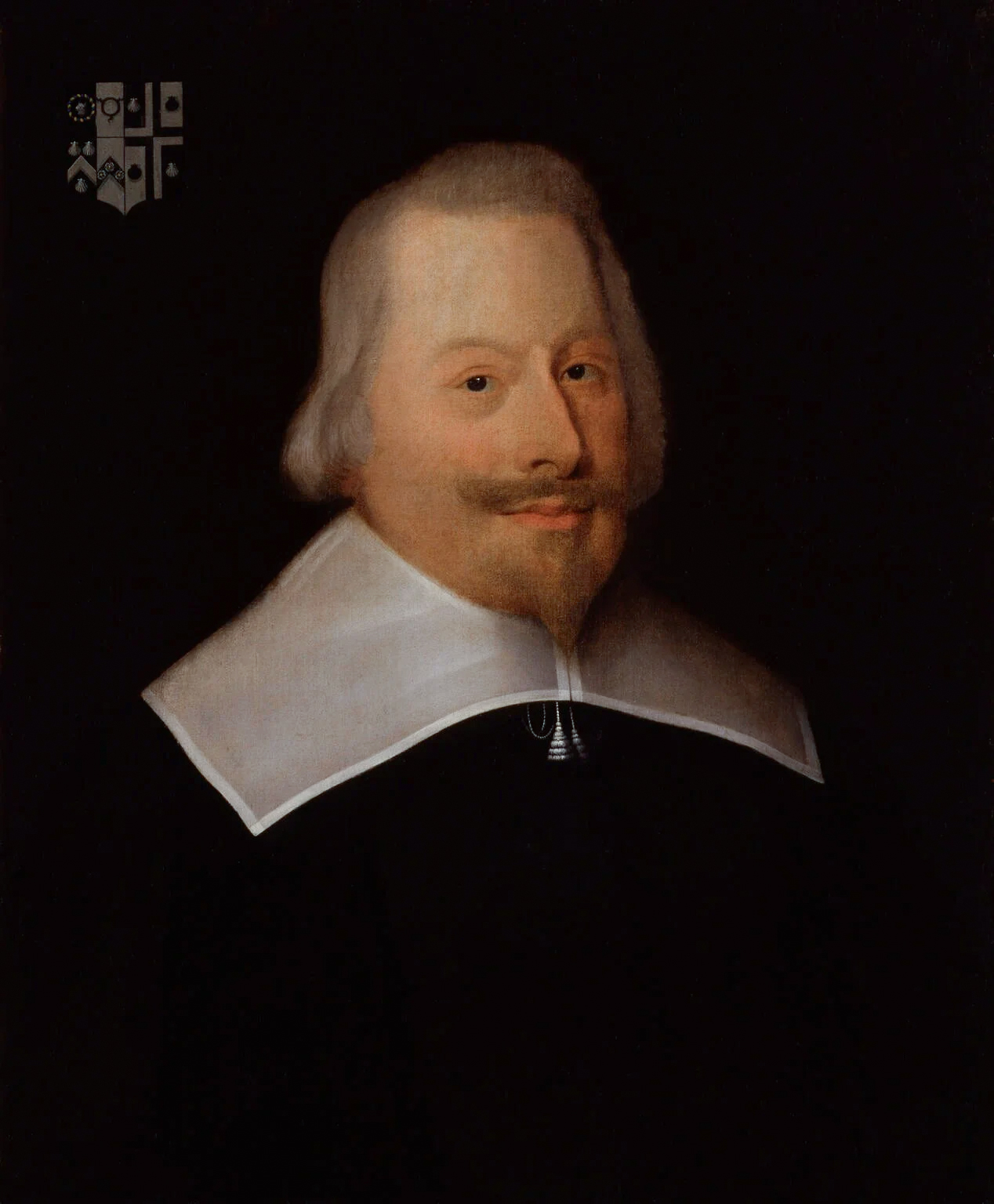
John Pym, who led the opposition to Charles from 1640 until his death in December 1643

Later in the war, a middle party emerged within Parliament known as "Independent Royalists", who were generally religious radicals but social conservatives, led by William Fiennes, 1st Viscount Saye and Sele, his son Nathaniel Fiennes, and Nathaniel Rich. They were distinguished from Royalists in believing Charles had to be defeated militarily, and from moderate Presbyterians by their opposition to state-mandated religion. After Parliament's victory in 1646, this group supported the Treaty of Newport, and a "balanced" political solution that would leave Charles on the throne. Its members avoided participation in his trial and execution, although they did not speak against it.

While Puritans were the most visible in opposing Laudian reforms and demanding the removal of bishops from the Church of England, their objections were shared by many Royalists, such as George Morley and Sir Edmund Verney. (Note: Edmund Verney, killed fighting for Charles at Edgehill in 1642, opposed his religious reforms and voted against him in Parliament) One reason was that bishops held a variety of non-religious roles which impacted all levels of society. They acted as state censors who were able to ban sermons and writings, while ordinary people could be tried by church courts for crimes including blasphemy, heresy, fornication and other 'sins of the flesh', as well as matrimonial or inheritance disputes. As members of the House of Lords, bishops often blocked legislation opposed by the Crown; their ousting from Parliament by the Clergy Act 1640 was a major step on the road to war, since it meant Charles could no longer prevent passage of legislation that he opposed.

Their removal temporarily ended censorship, and especially in London led to an explosion in the printing of pamphlets, books and sermons, many advocating radical religious and political ideas. Even before 1642, such radicalism concerned conservative Parliamentarians like Denzil Holles. As the war progressed, both they and their Scottish Covenanter allies came to see the Independents and New Model Army as more dangerous than the Royalists and formed the "Peace Party", seeking a negotiated end to the fighting. An alliance between Royalists and these two groups led to the Second English Civil War in 1648.

Lastly, in 1642 England and Wales were part of a highly structured, socially conservative and peaceful society. The devastation caused by the Thirty Years' War in Europe meant many wanted to avoid conflict at any cost, although it has been suggested military experience was more common within English society than often assumed. Choice of sides was often driven by personal relationships or loyalties, and in the early stages there were numerous examples of armed neutrality, or local truces, designed to force the two sides to negotiate.

== 1642 ==
Key ports, England & Wales, 1642

The winter of 1641 to 1642 saw many towns strengthen their defences, and purchase weapons, although not necessarily due to fears of civil war. Lurid details of the Irish Rebellion of 1641 meant many were more concerned by reports of a planned Catholic invasion. Although both Parliament and Charles supported raising troops to suppress the rising, alleged Royalist conspiracies to use them against Parliament meant neither trusted the other with their control. When Charles left London after failing to arrest the Five Members in January 1642, he handed Parliament control of the largest city, port and commercial centre in England, its biggest weapons store in the Tower of London, and best equipped local militia, or trained bands.

Founded in 1572, these were organised by county, controlled by lord-lieutenants appointed by the king, and constituted the only permanent military force in the country. The muster roll of February 1638 shows wide variations in size, equipment and training; Yorkshire had the largest, with 12,000 men, followed by London with 8,000, later increased to 20,000. Many of the biggest and best equipped were in areas controlled by Parliament, while those in Royalist counties like Shropshire or Glamorgan had fewer than 500 men each.

In March 1642, Parliament approved the Militia Ordinance, claiming control of the trained bands; Charles responded with his own Commissions of Array. More important than the men were the local arsenals, with Parliament holding the two largest in London and Hull. These belonged to the local community, who often resisted attempts to remove them by either side. In Royalist Cheshire, the towns of Nantwich, Knutsford and Chester declared a state of armed neutrality, and excluded both parties.

Ports provided access to internal and external waterways, the primary method of moving bulk supplies until the advent of railways in the 19th century. Most of the Royal Navy remained loyal to Parliament, allowing them to protect the trade routes vital to the London merchant community, block Royalist imports and resupply isolated Parliamentarian garrisons. It also made other countries wary of antagonising one of the strongest navies in Europe by providing support to their opponents. By September, Parliament controlled every major port in England apart from Newcastle, which prevented Royalist areas in Wales and the South West and North East England from supporting each other. When Charles sent Queen Henrietta Maria to the Hague in February 1642 to purchase weapons, the lack of a secure port delayed her return until February 1643, and even then, she narrowly escaped capture.

The Edgehill campaign 1642

On 1 June 1642, Parliament approved the Nineteen Propositions, granting them control over the militia, ministerial appointments, and the Royal household, including the education and marriage of his children. These were presented to Charles at Newmarket, who angrily rejected them without further discussion. He was later persuaded to issue a more conciliatory answer, primarily to blame what now seemed an inevitable military conflict on Pym and his followers. Drafted by Hyde, this has been seen as the origin of "mixed" or constitutional monarchy, although it is doubtful Charles was being sincere.

Both sides expected the war to be settled by a single battle. For the Royalists, this meant capturing London; for Parliament, 'rescuing' the king from his 'evil counsellors'. After failing to capture Hull in July, Charles left York for Nottingham, chosen for its proximity to Royalist areas in the Midlands and Northern Wales. Particularly in the early stages of the conflict, locally raised troops were reluctant to serve outside their own county, and most of those recruited in Yorkshire refused to accompany him. On 22 August, Charles formally declared war on Parliamentarian 'rebels', but by early September his army still numbered less than 2,500, with much of England hoping to remain neutral.

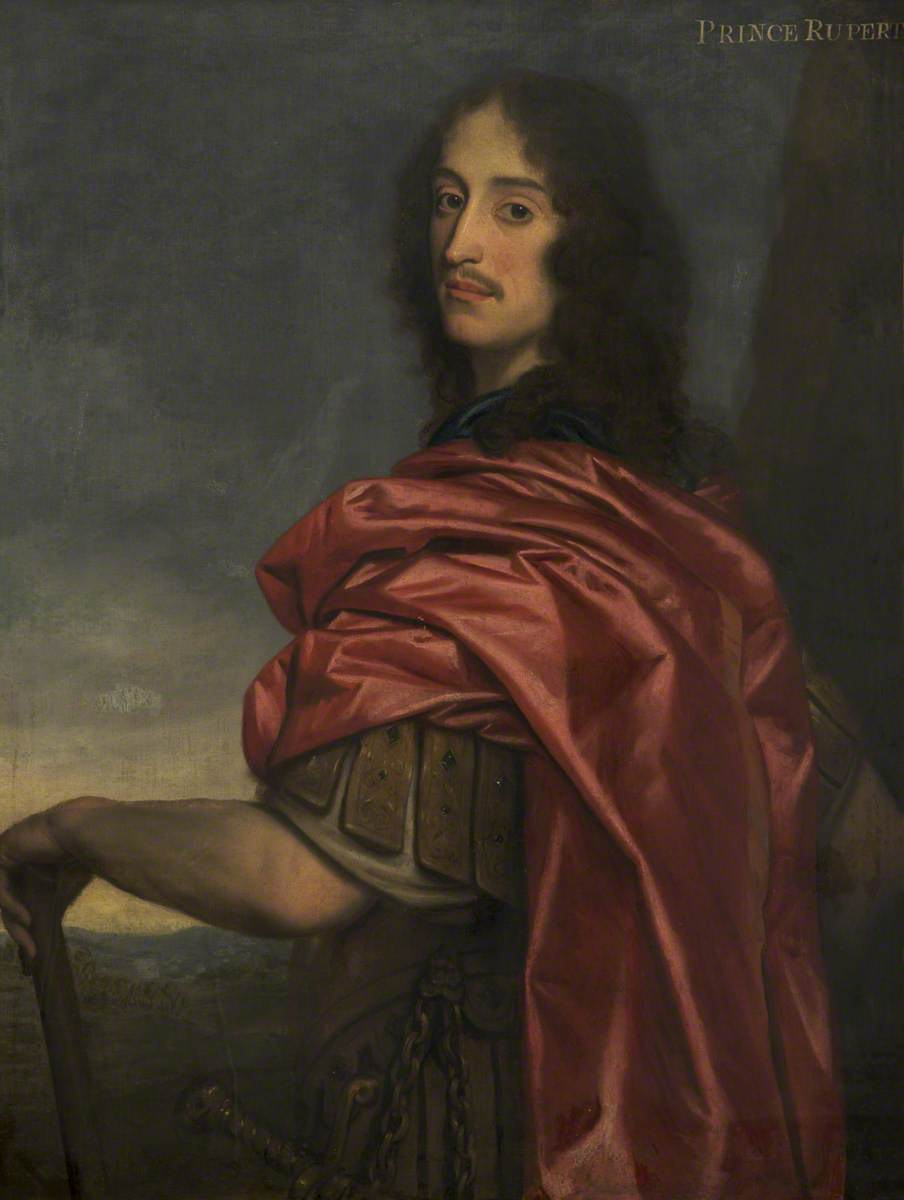
Charles' nephew and most talented general, Prince Rupert, popularised during the Victorian era as the archetypal Cavalier

In contrast, financing from the London mercantile community and weapons from the Tower enabled Parliament to recruit and equip an army of 20,000, commanded by the Presbyterian Earl of Essex, who left London on 3 September for Northampton. Charles relocated to Shrewsbury, further away from London but a key Royalist recruitment centre throughout the war. When Essex learned of this, he marched on Worcester, where the first major encounter of the war took place at Powick Bridge on 23 September. A relatively minor Royalist victory, it established the reputation of Prince Rupert, whose cavalry gained a psychological edge over their Parliamentarian opponents.

Although the Royalist army numbered around 15,000, much of the infantry were armed with clubs or scythes, and while better equipped, their opponents were half-trained, poorly disciplined, and with inadequate supplies. When Charles headed for London, Essex tried to block his route, and on 23 October the two armies fought a bloody, chaotic, and indecisive battle at Edgehill.

The Parliamentarian army fell back on London, fighting two inconclusive actions at Brentford and Turnham Green on 12 and 16 November. This proved to be the closest the Royalists came to taking London during the war, and they withdrew to Oxford, which now became their capital. Elsewhere, Sir William Waller secured South East England for Parliament, while in December Lord Wilmot captured Marlborough for the Royalists, opening communications between Oxford and their forces at Launceston, Cornwall.

== 1643 ==
Northern England 1643

The events of 1642 showed the need to plan for a lengthy conflict. For the Royalists, this meant fortifying their new capital in Oxford, and connecting areas of support in England and Wales; Parliament focused on consolidating control of the areas they already held. Although peace talks were held, both parties continued to negotiate for Scottish and Irish support. Charles sought to end the war in Ireland, which would enable him to transfer troops from the Royal Irish Army to England.

Fighting continued during the winter in Yorkshire, where Royalist forces under the Marquess of Newcastle tried to secure a landing place for an arms shipment from the Dutch Republic. With insufficient troops to hold the entire area, his task was further complicated by Parliamentarian forces under Lord Fairfax and his son Thomas, which retained key towns like Hull and Leeds. Along with Henrietta Maria, the weapons convoy finally managed to land at Bridlington in late February, and on 4 June she left York escorted by 5,000 cavalry, arriving in Oxford in mid-July.

In the south-west, Royalist commander Sir Ralph Hopton secured Cornwall with victory at Braddock Down in January. In June, he advanced into Wiltshire, inflicting a serious defeat on Waller's 'Army of the Southern Association' at Roundway Down on 13 July. Arguably the most comprehensive Royalist victory of the war, it isolated Parliament's garrisons in the west and Prince Rupert stormed Bristol on 26 July. This gave the Royalists control of the second largest city in Britain and landing point for reinforcements from Ireland.

By late August, the Parliamentarian cause was close to collapse but was saved by Pym's leadership and determination, which resulted in important reforms. Both sides struggled to properly supply troops fighting outside their home regions and Parliament agreed steps to mitigate the problem. Seeing an opportunity to force Parliamentary moderates into a negotiated peace, in September the Royalists agreed a new three-part offensive. After taking Gloucester, Prince Rupert would advance on London, while Newcastle would tie down the Eastern Association army by advancing into East Anglia and Lincolnshire. Finally, Hopton would march into Hampshire and Sussex, threatening London from the south, and closing the iron foundries that were Parliament's main source of armaments.

Southern England 1643

However, Essex forced Prince Rupert to retreat from Gloucester, then checked his advance on London at Newbury on 20 September. Although Hopton reached Winchester, Waller prevented him making further progress; in October, Newcastle abandoned the second siege of Hull, while victory at Winceby secured eastern England for Parliament. Royalist failure ended any chance of concluding the war in the near future, leading both sides to step up the search for allies.

In September, the Marquess of Ormond, Royalist Lord Lieutenant of Ireland, agreed a truce with the Catholic Confederation. The "Cessation" meant troops could be sent to England, but it cost Charles the support of many Irish Protestants, especially in Munster. At the same time, details emerged of the "Antrim scheme", an alleged plan to use 20,000 Irish troops to recapture southern Scotland for Charles. Although highly impractical, the Covenanter government now broke off negotiations with the Royalists. Shortly thereafter, they signed the Solemn League and Covenant with Parliament, which provided Scottish military support in return for subsidies. Parliament also agreed to create the Westminster Assembly, whose purpose was to set up a single, Presbyterian church for England and Scotland. This in turn caused divisions with those Parliamentarians who preferred a separate Church of England, as well as religious Independents who opposed any state religion.

== 1644 ==
England and Wales, 1644

The Solemn League created a Committee of Both Kingdoms to co-ordinate strategy in all three war zones, England, Scotland and Ireland, although Pym's death in December 1643 deprived Parliament of their most important leader. The Scots under Leven were ordered to take Newcastle, securing coal supplies for London, and closing the major import point for Royalist war supplies. He besieged the town in early February, but made little progress, observed by the Earl of Newcastle from his base in Durham.

On 29 March, Waller ended the offensive in Southern England by defeating Hopton at Cheriton, then joined Essex to threaten Oxford. Two weeks later, the Earl of Manchester defeated a Royalist force at Selby, forcing Newcastle to leave Durham and garrison York. The city was besieged by the Scots, Sir Thomas Fairfax, and Manchester's Army of the Eastern Association.

In May, Prince Rupert left Shrewsbury, and marched north, capturing Liverpool and Bolton en route. To avoid being shut up in Oxford, a field army nominally commanded by Charles retreated to Worcester; Essex ordered Waller to remain there, while he went west to relieve the siege of Lyme Regis. On 29 June, Waller clashed with Charles at Cropredy Bridge; although losses were minimal, his men were demoralised, and the army disintegrated, allowing Charles to pursue Essex into the West Country.

On the same day, Prince Rupert arrived at Knaresborough, 30 kilometres from York, to find himself facing a superior force. In the largest battle of the war on 2 July, the two armies met at Marston Moor, a decisive Royalist defeat that lost them the North. York surrendered on 16 July, and the Earl of Newcastle went into exile. However, the Parliamentarian commanders failed to exploit their victory, leading to an increasingly bitter dispute over the direction of the war.

Elsewhere, Essex lifted the siege of Lyme Regis, then continued into Cornwall, ignoring orders to return to London. At Lostwithiel in September, he was trapped by the main Royalist field army, and 5,000 infantry forced to surrender, although Essex himself escaped with the cavalry. At Second Newbury on 27 October, the Royalists lifted the siege of Donnington Castle, and Charles re-entered Oxford.

In military terms, these successes meant the Royalists had partially recovered from defeat at Marston Moor, but of greater concern was their ability to finance the war. Unlike Parliament, which could levy taxes on imports and exports through London and other commercial centres, the Royalists had to rely on contributions from the areas they controlled. After three years of war, opposition to these led to the creation of Clubmen, or local self-defence associations. While present in territories controlled by both sides, they were a bigger issue in Royalist areas like Cornwall and Hertfordshire.

Oliver Cromwell; in 1644, he emerged as a leader of the War Party, who believed negotiations could be held only after military victory

The deaths of John Pym and John Hampden in 1643 had removed a unifying force within Parliament, and deepened internal divisions. The largely Presbyterian and socially conservative 'Peace Party' was concerned by political radicals like the Levellers, and wanted an immediate, negotiated settlement. The 'War Party' fundamentally mistrusted Charles, and saw military victory as the only way to secure their objectives. Many were religious Independents who opposed any state church, and strongly objected to Scottish demands for a unified, Presbyterian church of England and Scotland. One of the most prominent of these was Oliver Cromwell, who claimed he would fight, rather than accept such an outcome.

Failure to exploit Marston Moor, Essex' capitulation at Lostwithiel, and Manchester's alleged unwillingness to fight at Newbury led to claims they were not committed to victory. Although driven by Cromwell, criticisms of Manchester and Essex in particular were shared by some Presbyterians, including Waller. In December, Sir Henry Vane introduced the Self-denying Ordinance, requiring military officers who also sat as MPs to choose one office. This meant Manchester and Essex were automatically removed, since they could not resign their titles.

It also led to the creation of the New Model Army, a centralised, professional force, able to operate wherever needed, rather than being restricted to a geographical area. Many moderates in Parliament viewed the new force as a hotbed of radical ideas, and to offset this, appointed Fairfax and Philip Skippon as Commander-in-Chief and head of the infantry respectively, as well as retaining some regional forces. These included the Northern and Western Associations, plus those serving in Cheshire and South Wales, all commanded by supporters of the Presbyterian faction in Parliament. Although he remained an MP, Cromwell was given command of the cavalry, under a 'temporary' three-month commission, constantly renewed.

== 1645 ==
Western England & South Wales; 1645

In January, representatives of both sides met at Uxbridge to discuss peace terms, but talks ended without agreement in February. Failure strengthened the pro-war parties, since it was clear Charles would never make concessions voluntarily, while divisions among their opponents encouraged the Royalists to continue fighting. In early 1645, the Royalists still controlled most of the West Country, Wales, and counties along the English border, despite losing their key supply base at Shrewsbury in February. Lord Goring's Western Army made another attempt on Portsmouth and Farnham; although he was forced to retreat, it showed Parliament could not assume this area was secure, while Montrose's Highland Campaign opened another front in the war.

On 31 May, Prince Rupert stormed Leicester; in response, Fairfax and the New Model Army abandoned their blockade of Oxford, and on 14 June, won a decisive victory at Naseby. Defeat cost the Royalists their most formidable field army, along with their artillery train, stores, and Charles' personal baggage. This included his private correspondence, detailing efforts to gain support from the Irish Catholic Confederation, the Papacy and France. Published by Parliament in a pamphlet entitled The King's Cabinet Opened, it seriously damaged his reputation.

After Naseby, Royalist strategy was to preserve their positions in Western England and Wales, while their cavalry went north to link up with Montrose in Scotland. Charles also hoped the Irish Catholic Confederation would supply him with an army of 10,000, that would land in Bristol and combine with Lord Goring to smash the New Model. Such hopes were illusory, and the only result was to deepen divisions among the Royalist leadership, many of whom viewed the proposed use of Catholic Irish troops in England with as much horror as their Parliamentarian opponents. Concerned by the wider implications of Royalist defeat and urged on by Henrietta Maria, French chief minister Cardinal Mazarin looked for ways to restore Charles with minimal French intervention. Talks were held between his representative, Jean de Montereul, and Lord Lothian, a senior Covenanter who was deeply suspicious of Cromwell and the Independents, but these discussions ultimately went nowhere.

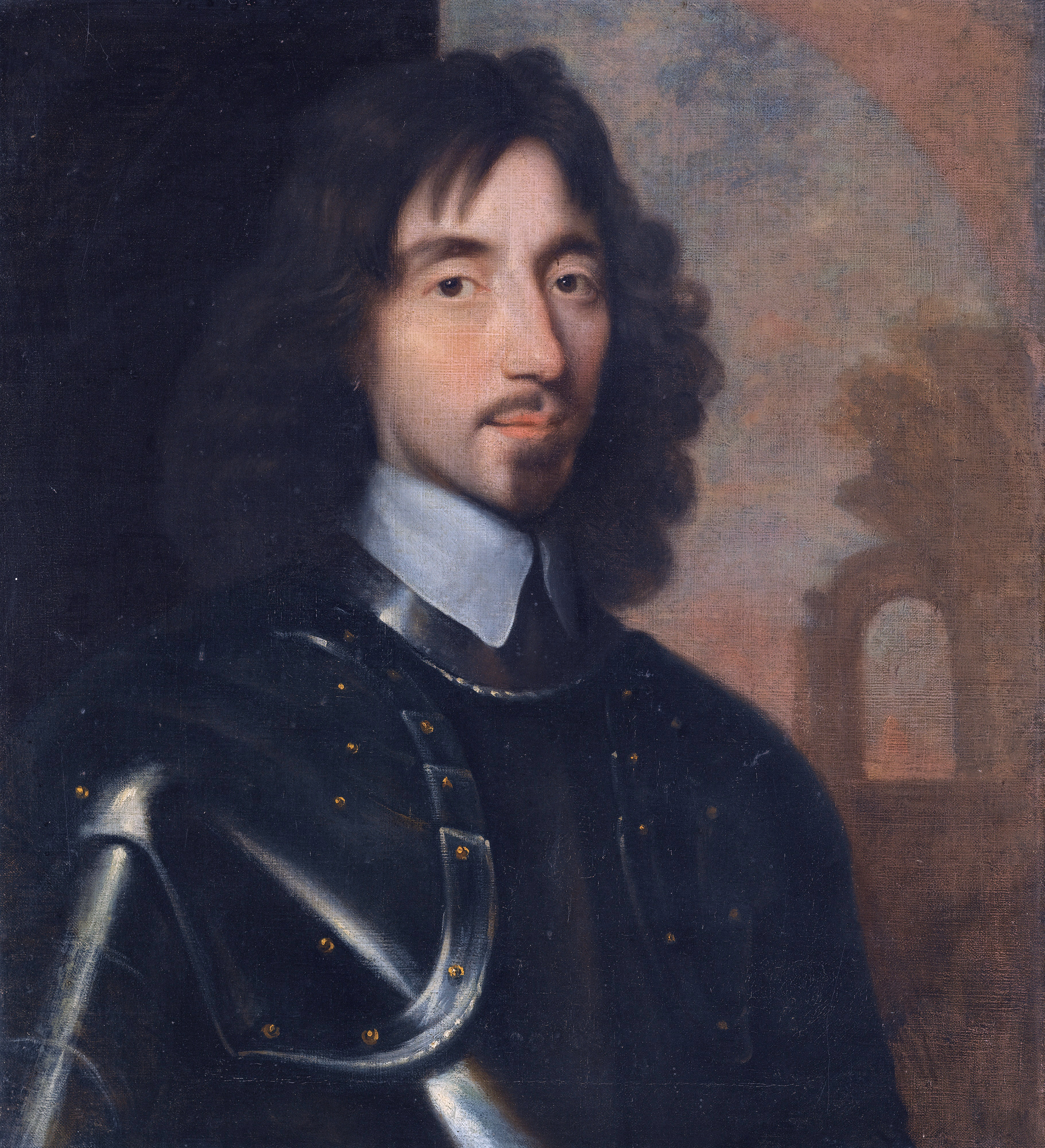
Sir Thomas Fairfax, commander of the New Model Army

Prince Rupert was sent to supervise the defence of Bristol and the West, while Charles made his way to Raglan Castle, then headed for the Scottish border. He reached as far north as Doncaster in Yorkshire, before retreating to Oxford in the face of superior Parliamentarian forces. In July, Fairfax lifted the siege of Taunton; a few days later at Langport, he destroyed Lord Goring's Western Army, the last significant Royalist field force. At the end of August, Charles left Oxford to relieve Hereford, which was besieged by the Covenanter army; as he approached, Leven was ordered to return to Scotland, following Montrose's victory at Kilsyth. The king moved onto Chester, where he learned Prince Rupert had surrendered Bristol on 10 September. Shocked by the loss, Charles dismissed his nephew.

While one detachment from the New Model under Colonel Rainsborough secured Berkeley Castle, another under Cromwell captured Royalist strongholds at Basing House and Winchester. Having secured his rear, Fairfax began reducing remaining positions in the west; by now, Clubmen militia in Hampshire and Dorset were as big an issue as the Royalist army. When his remaining cavalry were scattered at Rowton Heath on 24 September, Charles abandoned attempts to reach Scotland and returned to Newark. On 13 October, he learned of Montrose's defeat at Philiphaugh a month earlier, ending plans for taking the war into Scotland. The loss of Carmarthen and Chepstow in South Wales cut connections with Royalist supporters in Ireland (see Map) and Charles made his way back to Oxford, where he spent the winter besieged by the New Model.

== 1646 ==
England & Wales, 1646

Following the fall of Hereford in December 1645, the Royalists held only Devon, Cornwall, North Wales, and isolated garrisons in Exeter, Oxford, Newark, and Scarborough Castle. Chester surrendered in February, after which the Northern Association Army joined the Covenanters besieging Newark. Hopton replaced Lord Goring as commander of the Western Army, and attempted to relieve Exeter. Defeated by the New Model at Torrington on 16 February, he surrendered at Truro on 12 March.

The last pitched battle of the war took place at Stow-on-the-Wold on 21 March, when 3,000 Royalists were dispersed by Parliamentary forces. With the end of the war in sight, Parliament issued a proclamation, allowing favourable terms for any Royalists who 'compounded' prior to 1 May. Those whose estates had been confiscated could regain them on payment of a fine, which was calculated on the value of their lands, and level of support; many took advantage of this.

After capturing Exeter and Barnstaple in April, the New Model marched on Oxford; on 27 April, Charles left the city in disguise, accompanied by two others. Parliament learned of his escape on the 29th, but for over a week had no idea where he was. On 6 May, they received a letter from David Leslie, the Scottish commander at Newark, announcing he had Charles in custody. Newark surrendered the same day, and the Scots went north to Newcastle, taking the king with them. This led to furious objections from Parliament, who approved a resolution ordering the Scots to leave England immediately.

After lengthy negotiations, Oxford capitulated on 24 June; the garrison received passes to return home, and Prince Rupert and his brother, Prince Maurice, were ordered to leave England. Wallingford Castle surrendered on 27 July, then the remaining Royalist strongholds, although Harlech Castle in Wales held out until 13 March 1647.

== Aftermath ==
In 1642, many Parliamentarians assumed military defeat would force Charles to negotiate terms, which proved a fundamental misunderstanding of his character. When Prince Rupert told him in August 1645 that the war could no longer be won, Charles responded that while this may have been an accurate assessment of the military situation, 'God will not suffer rebels and traitors to prosper'. This deeply-held conviction meant he refused to agree to any substantial concessions, frustrating both allies and opponents.

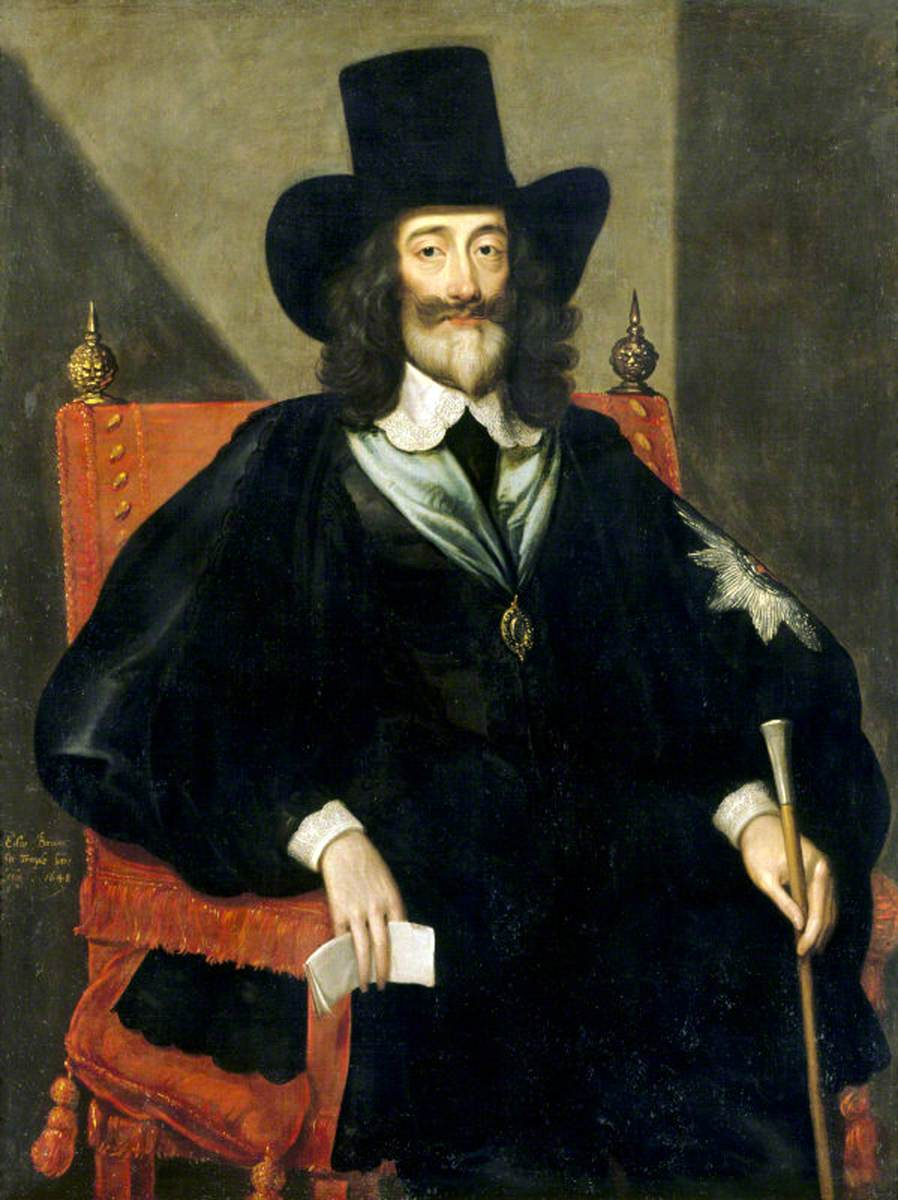
Charles' refusal to make significant concessions highlighted divisions among his opponents

Although Charles correctly assumed widespread support for the institution of monarchy made his position extremely strong, he failed to appreciate the impact of his constant prevarications, both before and during the war. He made peace with the Scots in 1639, then raised an army against them in 1640, while his actions prior to March 1642 convinced Parliament he would not keep his promises, and that any money they supplied would be employed against them. At various points in the period following Royalist defeat in 1646, he was negotiating separately with the Irish Confederation, the English Independents, the Covenanters, English Presbyterians, France, and the Papacy.

The result was the creation of a powerful faction who believed Charles would never voluntarily agree to a suitable political settlement, and whose control of the New Model Army gave them the ability to impose one. Often grouped together as 'Independents', the reality was far more fluid; Sir Thomas Fairfax was a Presbyterian, who fought for Charles in 1639, and refused to participate in his execution, while even Cromwell initially viewed him with great respect. William Fiennes, 1st Viscount Saye and Sele, and his sons, Nathaniel and John, are examples of those who supported the Independents out of religious conviction, but wanted Charles to retain his throne.

Charles continued to stall, to the increasing frustration of all parties, especially members of the New Model, many of whom had not been paid for over a year and wanted to go home. By March 1647, these arrears amounted to some £2.5 million, an enormous sum for the period, and moderates in Parliament led by Denzil Holles decided to remove the threat by sending the army to Ireland. Importantly, only those who agreed to go would receive their arrears, and when regimental representatives, or Agitators, demanded full payment for all in advance, Parliament disbanded the New Model, which refused to be dissolved. Although both Cromwell and Fairfax were disturbed by the radicalism displayed by parts of the army in the Putney Debates, they supported them against Parliament over the issue of pay. These tensions contributed to the outbreak of the Second English Civil War in 1648.

== Sources ==
- Burch, Stuart (2003). On Stage at the Theatre of State: The Monuments and Memorials in Parliament Square, London (PDF) (PHD thesis). Nottingham Trent University.
- Carlton, Charles (1992). Going to the wars; the experience of the British civil wars 1638 to 1651. Routledge. ISBN 0-4150-3282-2.
- Cotton, ANB (1975). "Cromwell and the Self-Denying Ordinance". History. 62 (205): 211–231. doi:10.1111/j.1468-229X.1977.tb02337.x. JSTOR 24411238.
- Day, Jon (2007). Gloucester & Newbury 1643 : the Turning Point of the Civil War. Havertown: Pen and Sword. ISBN 978-1-4738-1464-6.
- Hardacre, Paul (1956). The Royalists during the Puritan Revolution. Springer. ISBN 978-9-4017-4563-5.
- Harris, Tim (2014). Rebellion: Britain's First Stuart Kings, 1567–1642. OUP. ISBN 978-0-1992-0900-2.
- Healey, Jonathan (2025). The Blood in Winter; A nation descends, 1642. Bloomsbury. ISBN 978-1526672292.
- Helmholz, R.H. (2003). Mulholland, Maureen (ed.). Judges and trials in the English ecclesiastical courts in "Judicial Tribunals in England and Europe, 1200–1700 Volume I". Manchester University Press. ISBN 978-0-7190-6342-8.
- Hopper, Andrew (2012). Turncoats and Renegadoes: Changing Sides During the English Civil Wars. OUP. ISBN 978-0-1995-7585-5.
- Hutton, Ronald (2003). The Royalist War Effort 1642–1646. Routledge. ISBN 978-0-4153-0540-2.
- Johnson, David (2012). Parliament in crisis; the disintegration of the Parliamentarian war effort during the summer of 1643 (PDF) (PHD thesis). York University.
- Kaplan, Lawrence (1970). "Steps to War: The Scots and Parliament, 1642–1643". Journal of British Studies. 9 (2): 50–70. doi:10.1086/385591. JSTOR 175155. S2CID 145723008.
- Macleod, Donald (Autumn 2009). "The influence of Calvinism on politics" (PDF). Theology in Scotland. XVI (2): 5–19.
- Malcolm, Joyce (1977). "A King in Search of Soldiers: Charles I in 1642". The Historical Journal. 21 (2): 251–273. doi:10.1017/S0018246X00000534. JSTOR 2638260. S2CID 154575635.
- Marsh, Bethany (2020). "A War of Words; politics, propaganda and censorship during the Civil Wars". History Today. 70 (B).
- Milton, Anthony (2021). England's Second Reformation; the Battle for the Church of England 1625–1662. CUP. ISBN 978-1-1081-6930-1.
- Montrose Campaign. "Campaigns of Montrose". BCW Project.
- Morrill, John (1972). "Mutiny and discontent in English provincial armies 1645–1647". Past and Present (56): 49–74. doi:10.1093/past/56.1.49.
- Mortlock, Stephen (2017). "Death and Disease in the English Civil War". The Biomedical Scientist.
- Pells, Ismini (2012). "Professionalism, Piety and the Tyranny of Idleness: Life on Campaign for the English Regiments in Dutch Service, c.1585-1648". Early Modern British and Irish History Seminar: 1–21.
- Purkiss, Diane (2006). The English Civil War: A People's History. Harper Press. ISBN 978-0-0071-5061-8.
- Rees, John (2016). The Leveller Revolution. Verso. ISBN 978-1-7847-8390-7.
- Robertson, Barry (2014). Royalists at War in Scotland and Ireland, 1638–1650. Ashgate. ISBN 978-1-4094-5747-3.
- Royle, Trevor (2006) [2004]. Civil War: The Wars of the Three Kingdoms 1638–1660. Abacus. ISBN 978-0-3491-1564-1.
- Schwarz, Marc (2004). "Fiennes, Nathaniel (1607/8–1669)". Oxford Dictionary of National Biography (online ed.). Oxford University Press. doi:10.1093/ref:odnb/9413. (Subscription, Wikipedia Library access or UK public library membership required.)
- Scott, David (2008). Adamson, John (ed.). Rethinking Royalist Politics, 1642–1647; in The English Civil War: Conflict and Contexts, 1640–49. Palgrave. ISBN 978-0-3339-8656-1.
- Smith, David (2004). "William Fiennes, 1st Viscount Saye and Sele (1582–1662)". Oxford Dictionary of National Biography (online ed.). Oxford University Press. doi:10.1093/ref:odnb/9415. (Subscription, Wikipedia Library access or UK public library membership required.)
- Spurr, John (1998). English Puritanism, 1603–1689. Palgrave. ISBN 978-0-3336-0188-4.
- Wedgwood, C.V. (1958). The King's War, 1641–1647 (1983 ed.). Penguin Classics. ISBN 978-0-1400-6991-4.
- Weston, Corinne (1960). "English Constitutional Doctrines from the Fifteenth Century to the Seventeenth: II. The Theory of Mixed Monarchy under Charles I and after". English Historical Review. 75 (296): 426–443. doi:10.1093/ehr/LXXV.296.426. JSTOR 557624.
- Woolrych, Austin (2002). Britain in Revolution. OUP. ISBN 978-0-1982-0081-9.
- Worsley, Lucy (2007). Cavalier: The Story of a 17th Century Playboy. Faber & Faber. ISBN 978-0-5712-2703-7.
- Yule, George (1968). "Independents and Revolutionaries". Journal of British Studies. 7 (2): 11–32. doi:10.1086/385550. JSTOR 175293. S2CID 145327855.
- Zuvich, Andrea (2015). The Stuarts in 100 Facts. Amberley Publishing. ISBN 978-1-4456-4731-9.
