= William Basse =

English poet

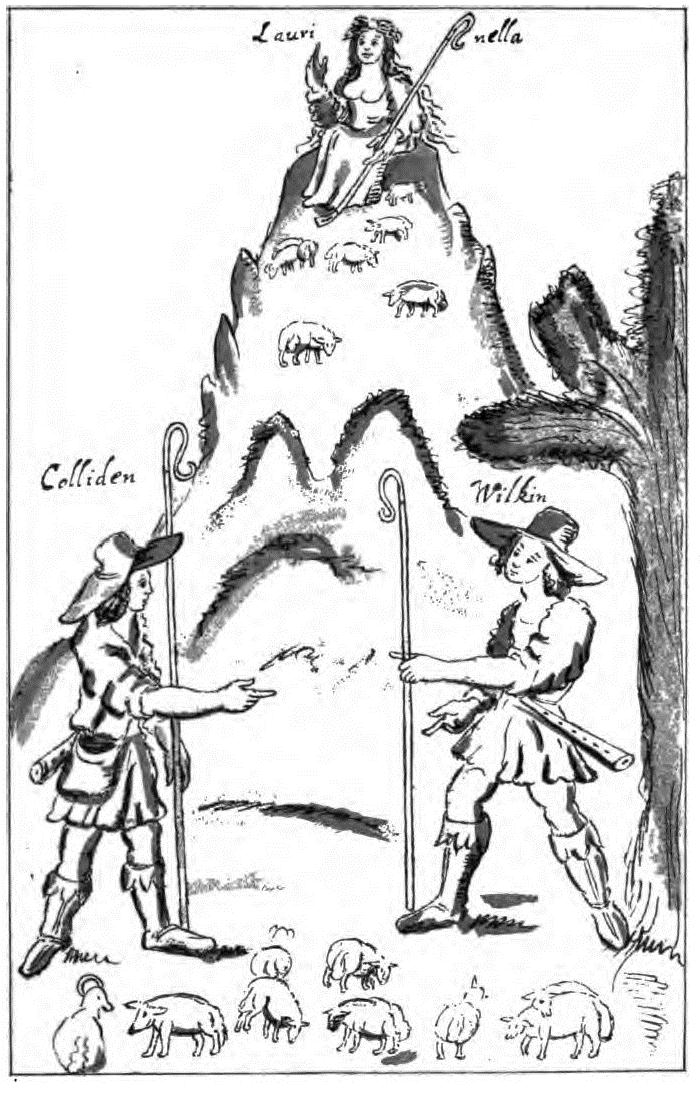
drawing of shepherds reproduced in the Poetical Works of William Basse, possibly by Basse himself

William Basse (c.1583–1653?) was an English poet. A follower of Edmund Spenser, he is now remembered principally for an elegy on Shakespeare. He is also noted for his "Angler's song", which was written for Izaak Walton, who included it in The Compleat Angler.

== Family-background ==
William Basse's family background and place of birth are unknown. He was described by the antiquary Anthony à Wood in 1638 as "of Moreton, near Thame, in Oxfordshire, sometime a retainer to the Lord Wenman of Thame Park". R. Warwick Bond has suggested that Basse may have come to Thame from Northamptonshire as page to Agnes Fermor, first wife of Richard Wenman, 1st Viscount Wenman, and daughter of Sir George Fermor of Easton Neston, Northamptonshire. From the references made in Basse's poems to Francis Norris, 1st Earl of Berkshire, it has been inferred that the poet was at one time also attached to his household at Rycote, Oxfordshire. Basse dedicated Polyhymnia to Bridget, Countess of Lindsey, second wife of Montagu Bertie, 2nd Earl of Lindsey, and the opening poem in the volume is addressed to the Countess's grandfather, Francis Norris, 1st Earl of Berkshire:

In playne (my honour'd Lord) I was not borne
Audacious vowes or forraigne legs to use;
Nature denyed my outside to adorne,
And I of art to learne outsides refuse.
Yet haveing of them both enough to scorne
Silence and vulgar prayse, this humble Muse
And her meane favourite at your command
Chose in this kinde to kisse your noble hand.

== Career ==
Basse was educated at Lord Williams's School.

The long interval of fifty-one years between the production of the first and last poems bearing Basse's signature led John Payne Collier to conjecture that there were two poets of the same name, and he attributed to an elder William Basse the works published in 1602, and to a younger William Basse all those published later. The internal evidence offered by the poems fails, however, to support this conclusion. "Urania", the last poem of the collection, bearing the date 1653, has all the metrical characteristics of the "Sword and Buckler" of 1602; and Bathurst's verses prove that Basse followed his poetical career through many generations.

Although Basse drew early patronage from the Wenman (or Waynman) family of Thame, Oxfordshire, and of Twyford, Buckinghamshire, the dedicatee of his early work Three Pastoral Elegies of Anander, Anetor, and Muridella (published 1602), Jane Lady Tasburgh, who had been the wife of Thomas Wenman (died 1577) and was mother of Richard, and then wife of James Cressy, had by 1602 long been married (as his second wife) to Thomas Tasburgh (died 1602-03), MP, of Hawridge, Buckinghamshire, a Teller of the Queen's Exchequer, the youngest representative of a family seated at Flixton in north Suffolk. Thomas and Jane Tasburgh, who acquired the Wenman manor of Twyford, had no Tasburgh children, and in 1597 granted Hawridge to their nephew Sir John Tasburgh, who built Flixton Hall in 1615. Sir John's wife was Lettice Cressy, half-sister to Jane's Wenman children. Jane herself lived until about 1621.

A William Basse 'of Suffolk' entered Emmanuel College, Cambridge, as a sizar in 1629, and took the degree of B.A. in 1632, and that of M.A. in 1636, but it is highly improbable that this student was the poet. There was a family named Basse, of Benhall, Suffolk, in the seventeenth century, of whom a William died in 1607, aged 85, and left a son Thomas and a grandson William, probably the Cambridge student; but it is impossible to identify the poet with any member of this family. The fact that his 'Great Brittaines Sunnesset' was published at Oxford, and his intimate relations with two great Oxfordshire houses, seem to connect the poet with Oxfordshire rather than with Suffolk.

== Verse ==
On Shakespeare

Renowned Spenser, lie a thought more nigh
To learned Chaucer, and rare Beaumond lie
A little nearer Spenser, to make room
For Shakespeare in your threefold, fourfold Tomb.
To lodge all four in one bed make a shift
Until Doomsday, for hardly will a fifth
Betwixt this day and that by Fate be slain,
For whom your Curtains may be drawn again.
If your precedency in death doth bar
A fourth place in your sacred sepulchre,
Under this carved marble of thine own,
Sleep, rare Tragedian, Shakespeare sleep alone;
Thy unmolested peace, unshared Cave,
Possess as Lord, not Tenant, of the Grave,
That unto us and others it may be
Honour hereafter to be laid by thee.

In 1602 two poems by 'William Bas' were published in London. The one was entitled "Sword and Buckler, or Serving Man's Defence"; the other "Three Pastoral Elegies of Anander, Anetor, and Muridella". Of the former, which the author describes as his first production, a unique perfect copy is in the Bodleian Library; it was reprinted in J.P. Collier's Illustrations of Early English Popular Literature, vol. ii., in 1864. The only copy known of the latter is in Winchester College library: it bears the printed dedication to Jane (West), Lady Tasburgh, then second wife of Sir Thomas Tasburgh but formerly wife of Thomas Wenman (died 1577), and mother of Richard Wenman. In 1613 an elegy on Henry Frederick, Prince of Wales, called "Great Brittaines; Sunnes-set, bewailed with a Shower of Teares, by William Basse", was issued by Joseph Barnes at Oxford. It was dedicated by the author "to his honourable master, Sir Richard Wenman, knight", and was reproduced at Oxford by W. H. Allnutt from the perfect copy at the Bodleian in 1872.

No other volume of Basse's poems was printed in his lifetime, but two manuscript collections, prepared for the press, are still extant. Of these, one bears the title of Polyhymnia, and has never been printed. The only copy of it was known to belong to Richard Heber, and afterward to Thomas Corser; on the fly-leaf is the autograph of Francis, Lord Norreys, to whom the opening verses are addressed, and to whose sister, Bridget, Countess of Lindsey, the collection is dedicated. Another manuscript of Polyhymnia, described by Cole in his manuscript 'Athenæ Cantab.' and now lost, differed materially from the Corser manuscript. The second collection left by Basse in manuscript consists of three long pastoral poems, of which the first is dedicated to Sir Richard Wenman; bears the date 1653, and was printed for the first time in J.P. Collier's Miscellaneous Tracts, in 1872. To it is prefixed a poem addressed to Basse, by Ralph (afterwards dean) Bathurst, who compares the author to an "aged oak", and says:

... thy grey muse grew up with older times,
And our deceased grandsires lisp'd the rhymes.

Bathurst's verses were printed in Warton's pleasant 'Life of Bathurst' (1761), p. 288, with the inscription 'To Mr. W. Basse upon the intended publication of his poems, 13 January 1651.'

Basse's most famous poem is his "enormously popular sixteen-line elegy on Shakespeare":

[It was] written between 1616 (when Shakespeare died) and 1623 (when Jonson responded to Basse in his own tribute to Shakespeare in the First Folio). Wells and Taylor list twenty-seven different seventeenth-century manuscript versions of the poem, ten of which attribute it to Basse, including one (British Library, Lansdowne MS 777, fol. 67v) in the handwriting of Basse's friend William Browne. It first reached print in the 1633 edition of John Donne's poems, but was dropped from the 1635 edition, and was next printed in the 1640 edition of Shakespeare's poems, with a correct attribution to 'W. B.' and the title 'On the Death of William Shakespeare, who Died in Aprill, Anno. Dom. 1616' (sig. K8v). The same year it was also printed anonymously in Wits Recreation.

Basse also wrote a commendatory poem for Michael Baret's Hipponomie, or the Vineyard of Horsemanship (1618), and he has been identified with the 'W. B.' who contributed verses to Phillip Massinger's Bondman (1624), although William Browne has also been claimed as their author.

In Izaak Walton's Compleat Angler the character Piscator, representing Walton, remarks, "I'll promise you I'll sing a song that was lately made at my request by Mr. William Basse, one that hath made the choice songs of the 'Hunter in his Career' and of 'Tom of Bedlam', and many others of note; and this that I will sing is in praise of Angling." Basse's "Angler's Song", beginning "As inward love breeds outward talk", then follows. Piscator's friend Coridon says "we are all beholding to the good man that made this song" and proposes a toast to the poet. Of the other two songs mentioned by Walton, a unique copy of "Maister Basse, his careere, or the new hunting. To a new Court tune", is in the Pepys collection at Cambridge; it is reprinted in 'Wit and Drollery' (1682), p. 64, and in Old Ballads (1725), ii. 196. The tune is given in the Skene MS. preserved in the Advocates' Library, Edinburgh, and a ballad in the Bagford collection in the British Museum, entitled "Hubert's Ghost", is written "to the tune of Basse's Career". Basse's second ballad, "Tom of Bedlam", has been identified by Sir Harris Nicolas in his edition of Walton's Angler, with a song of the same name in Percy's Reliques, ii. 357; but many other ballads bear the same title, and this identification is therefore doubtful. In 1636 Basse contributed a poem to the 'Annalia Dubrensia.'

== Works ==
- Great Brittaines Sunnes-set, bewailed with a shower of tears (1613)
- Maister Basse his Careere, or The new Hunting of the Hare To a new Court tune (1620)
- The Pastorals and other Workes of W. B., Never before imprinted Oxford, 1653. Ed. (Oxford, 1870) by J. P. Collier
- The Poetical Works of William Basse (1893) edited by R. Warwick Bond
