= James Whitelocke (Roundhead) =

Colonel James Whitlocke (1631 – October 1701) of Trumpington, Cambridgeshire supported the Parliamentary cause in the English Civil War, and was a Member of Parliament during the Interregnum.

== Biography ==
Whitlocke was the son of Sir Bulstrode Whitelocke and his first wife Rebecca Bennet, daughter of Thomas Bennet, and was baptised on 28 July 1631. He entered the Middle Temple 1647, and was chosen a Fellow of All Souls College, Oxford by the Parliamentary Visitors on 22 January 1649. He was a Captain and afterwards a Colonel in the Parliamentary Army. In 1653, he was concerned in a lease of gold and silver mines in Ireland with Miles Fleetwood and others.

In 1654, Whitlocke was elected Member of Parliament for Oxfordshire in the First Protectorate Parliament. He was knighted by Oliver Cromwell, the Lord Protector on 6 January 1656. (His father had been knighted only two years earlier.)

In 1659, he was elected MP for Aylesbury in the Third Protectorate Parliament. He died at the age of 69 in October 1701.

== Family ==
Whitlocke married firstly Mary Pritchard, widow of Thomas Pritchard and daughter of George Pyke of Trumpington. He married secondly Frances Willoughby daughter of William Lord Willoughby of Parham. His third wife was "the widow Wilson" and daughter of Carleton.

He was given Fawley Court in Buckinghamshire by his father, who had retired to the country. The house had been damaged during the civil war and James failed to repair it, selling it on to a Colonel Freeman in 1680.

== Notes ==
Parliament of England
Preceded by Sir Charles Wolseley; William Draper; Dr Jonathan Goddard	Member of Parliament for Oxfordshire; 1654; With: Robert Jenkinson; Nathaniel Fiennes; Charles Fleetwood; William Lenthall	Succeeded by Charles Fleetwood; Robert Jenkinson; William Lenthall; Miles Fleetwood; Sir Francis Norreys
Preceded by Thomas Scot	Member of Parliament for Aylesbury; 1659; With: Thomas Tyrrill	Succeeded by Sir Thomas Lee, 1st Baronet; Sir Richard Ingoldsby
