= Sir Robert Jenkinson, 1st Baronet =

English politician

Sir Robert Jenkinson, 1st Baronet (1621 – 30 March 1677), was an English politician who sat in the House of Commons from 1654 to 1659.

Jenkinson was the son of Sir Robert Jenkinson of Walcot, Oxfordshire, and his wife Anna-Maria Lee, daughter of Sir Robert Lee of Billeslee. He matriculated at Trinity College, Oxford, aged 16 on 16 December 1636 and was called to the bar at Inner Temple in 1649.

In 1654, Jenkinson was elected Member of Parliament for Oxfordshire in the First Protectorate Parliament. He was re-elected MP for Oxfordshire in 1656 for the Second Protectorate Parliament and in 1659 for the Third Protectorate Parliament. He was created baronet on 18 May 1661.

Jenkinson died at the age of 56.

Jenkinson married Mary Banks, daughter of Sir John Bankes of Kingston Hall, Dorset. He was succeeded in the baronetcy by his son Robert.

Parliament of England
Preceded by Sir Charles Wolseley, Bt; William Draper; Jonathan Goddard	Member of Parliament for Oxfordshire; 1654–1659; With: James Whitelocke 1654; Nathaniel Fiennes 1654; Charles Fleetwood 1654–1656; William Lenthall 1654–1656; Miles Fleetwood 1656; Sir Francis Norreys 1656; The Viscount Falkland 1659	Constituency not represented in the Restored Rump
Baronetage of England
New creation	Baronet of Walcot and Hawkesbury; 1661–1677	Succeeded by Robert Jenkinson
