= George Fermor (died 1612) =

English soldier and landowner

Arms of Fermor: Argent, a fess sable between three lion's heads erased gules

Sir George Fermor of Easton Neston (died 1612) was an English soldier and landowner.

George Fermor was the son of Sir John Fermor (d. 1571) and his wife, Maud (d. 1579), a daughter of Nicholas Vaux, 1st Baron Vaux of Harrowden. George Fermor fought in the Netherlands and was knighted by the Earl of Leicester in 1586. He was Sheriff of Northamptonshire in 1589.

On 27 June 1603, he entertained the courts of James VI and I and Anne of Denmark, who had travelled separately from Scotland, at Easton Neston near Towcester. The king knighted his eldest son, Hatton Fermor. Lady Anne Clifford described the day; "From Althorpe the Queen went to Sir Hatton Fermor's where the King met her, where there were an infinite company of Lords and Ladies, and other people, such that the country could scarce lodge them." The royal party went next to Grafton Regis next.

== Family ==
In 1572, he married Mary Curzon (d. 1628), a god-daughter and maid of honour of Mary I of England, and daughter of Thomas Curzon of Addington and Agnes Hussey. She owned the manor of Westoning. Their children included:

- Hatton Fermor (d. 1640), who married Elizabeth Anderson, daughter of Edmund Anderson, Chief Justice of the Common Pleas, and secondly, Anna Cockayne, daughter of William Cockayne, Lord Mayor of London. Their eldest son was Sir William Fermor, 1st Baronet.
- Robert Fermor (died 1616)
- Agnes Fermor (d. 1617), who married Sir Richard Wenman of Thame Park.
- Elizabeth Fermor, who married Sir William Stafford of Blatherwycke, and secondly Sir Thomas Chamberlayne, Chief Justice of Cheshire.
- Jane Fermor (d. 1638), who married and subsequently divorced, after a bitter decade-long battle, Sir John Killigrew of Falmouth Castle
- Catherine Fermor, who married William Hoby of Hailes
- Anne (or Mary) Fermor, who married Robert Crichton, 8th Lord Crichton of Sanquhar (d. 1612), and secondly, Barnabas O'Brien, 6th Earl of Thomond. She was the patron of the author Owen Feltham.
