= William Draper (MP) =

William Draper (1620–1672) was an English politician who sat in the House of Commons in 1653. He was an active supporter of Parliament during the Commonwealth.

Draper was probably the son of Robert Draper. The Drapers, originally from Kent, settled at Nether Worton in Oxfordshire, where William became one of the principal landowners. He is said to have been an active and improving landlord, though rather high-handed in dealing with his neighbours. He had at least one sister Anna, who married Francis Osborne, celebrated as the author of Advice to a Son. He matriculated at Christ Church, Oxford on 20 May 1636, aged 16. He was a commissioner for sequestration for Oxfordshire in March 1649 when he wrote to the Council of State concerning the "delinquents" at Oxford, and the Council replied on 29 March, "Thanks for your letter manifesting care to preserve the peace of the Commonwealth". In December 1649 there is a reference to a conspiracy against him. He was appointed by the council to be Captain of the Horse Militia in Oxfordshire on 2 April 1650, and was Governor of Oxford from 9 May 1651. He was made Captain of the Horse Volunteers of Oxford City and University on 16 August 1651. On 17 September the Council appointed him to guard Wallingford Castle and instructed him to march there "and remain there until you receive further order."

In 1653, Draper was nominated Member of Parliament for Oxfordshire in the Barebones Parliament. On 30 June 1653 the Council of State ordered "the Committee of Whitehall to provide lodgings there for Sir Charles Wolseley and Mr Draper" and in August he was assigned a stable in the Mews, late lodgings of Mr. Berry and "the stable and coach-house late Mr Simpson's, unless Berry shew cause to the contrary."

Draper was Sheriff of Oxfordshire in 1655 and again in 1657.

He married Mary Parsons of Nether Worton. They had a son, William, and a daughter, who married her cousin John Osborne, Serjeant-at-law (Ireland), by whom she had two children, and spent much of her life in Ireland.

His last will and testament is dated 29 March 1672.

Parliament of England
Preceded by Not represented in Rump Parliament	Member of Parliament for Oxfordshire; 1653; With: Sir Charles Wolseley; Dr Jonathan Goddard	Succeeded by Charles Fleetwood; Robert Jenkinson; William Lenthall; James Whitelocke; Nathaniel Fiennes
