= Viscount Saye and Sele =

Title in the Peerage of England

Viscount Saye and Sele was a title in the Peerage of England. It was created on 7 July 1624 for William Fiennes, 8th Baron Saye and Sele, who thus became the 1st Viscount Saye and Sele. The title became extinct on the death of Richard Fiennes 6th Viscount on 29 July 1781.

== Succession ==
Under James I of England, William Fiennes, the eighth Baron Saye and Sele, was created Viscount Saye and Sele in the Peerage of England, in 1624. On the death of his son, the second Viscount, the two titles separated. The barony fell into abeyance between the second Viscount's daughters Elizabeth, wife of John Twisleton, and Frances, wife of Andrew Ellis. It was later revived and is currently held by the Twisleton-Wykeham-Fiennes family, descendants of Cecil Fiennes, granddaughter of the second Viscount.

The Viscountcy could only be passed on to male heirs and was inherited by the second Viscount's nephew, the son of Nathaniel Fiennes, second son of the first Viscount. When the third Viscount's son, the fourth Viscount, died, he was succeeded by his cousin, the son of John Fiennes, third son of the first Viscount. The fifth Viscount was in his turn succeeded by another cousin. On the death of the sixth Viscount in 1781 there were no more male heirs left of the first Viscount, and the title became extinct.

== Viscounts Saye and Sele (1624 – 1781) ==
- William Fiennes, 1st Viscount Saye and Sele, 8th Baron Saye and Sele (1582–1662)
- James Fiennes, 2nd Viscount Saye and Sele, 9th Baron Saye and Sele (c. 1603–1674) (eldest son) (barony abeyant 1674); succeeded in the viscountcy only by his brother Nathaniel's son
- William Fiennes, 3rd Viscount Saye and Sele (c. 1641–1698) (nephew)
- Nathaniel Fiennes, 4th Viscount Saye and Sele (1676–1710) (son)
- Laurence Fiennes, 5th Viscount Saye and Sele (c. 1690–1742) (cousin, son of Col. John Fiennes, 3rd son of 1st Viscount)
- Richard Fiennes, 6th Viscount Saye and Sele (1716–1781) (cousin, grandson of Richard Fiennes, 4th son of 1st Viscount)

== Family of First Viscount ==
The family of the first Viscount includes:

- William Fiennes (1582 - 1662) 1st Viscount, 8th Baron Saye and Sale,

- James Fiennes (c1603 - 1673/74) 2nd Viscount, 9th Baron

married Frances Cecil daughter of Edward Cecil, 1st Viscount Wimbledon
- Elizabeth Fiennes (c1631 - 1674), married John Twisleton

- Cecil Twisleton (d 1713), married George Twisleton
- Frances Twisleton, married Andrew Ellis

- Cecily Ellis (d 1715) married William Fiennes, son of John Fiennes

- Nathaniel Fiennes (c1608 - 1669), 2nd son of 1st Viscount

- William Fiennes (c1641 - 1698) 3rd Viscount, married his first cousin Mary Fiennes

- Nathaniel Fiennes (1676 - 1709) 4th Viscount

- Celia Fiennes (1662 - 1741), pioneering traveller and writer

- John Fiennes, 3rd son of 1st Viscount

- Lawrence Fiennes (c1690 - 1742) 5th Viscount
- William Fiennes married Cicely Ellis

- Richard Fiennes, 4th son of 1st Viscount

- Mary Fiennes (c1653 - 1676), married her first cousin the 3rd Viscount
- Richard Fiennes (c1674 - 1722)

- Richard Fiennes (1716 - 1781) 6th Viscount

- Alice Fiennes, married John St Barbe

- Bridget Fiennes, married Theophilus Clinton, 4th Earl of Lincoln
- Constance Fiennes (d c1692), married Sir Francis Boynton, 2nd Baronet (1618–1695)
- Susannah Fiennes, married Thomas Erle, lawyer and politician

- Thomas Erle, army general and politician

- Elizabeth Fiennes, married Richard Norton of Southwick Park, landowner and politician
- Anne Fiennes, married Sir Charles Wolseley, 2nd Baronet, seven sons and ten daughters

== Parliament and Civil War ==
The three eldest sons of the first Viscount served as Members of Parliament, James representing Banbury and then Oxfordshire, Nathaniel for Banbury and John for Morpeth. The first Viscount's family including sons-in-law took the side of the Parliamentarians in the English Civil War, but the Viscount argued against the execution of the king and this helped his position when the monarchy was restored in 1660.
