= James Fiennes =

James Fiennes may refer to:

- James Fiennes, 1st Baron Saye and Sele (c. 1395–1450)
- James Fiennes, 2nd Viscount Saye and Sele (c. 1602–1674), MP for Banbury
