= Francis Wenman =

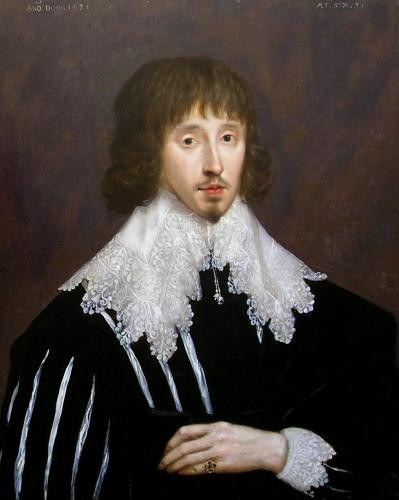
Sir Francis Wenman.

Sir Francis Wenman (9 December 1599 – 26 June 1640) was an English politician who sat in the House of Commons between 1628 and 1640.

== Biography ==
Wenman was the only son of Francis Wenman of Caswell, Oxfordshire, who died in Ireland three months before his son's birth, and Frances, daughter of William Goodyeare of Polesworth, Warwickshire. He was first cousin to Sir Richard Wenman. His father having died before his birth, he became the ward of the Anglo-Irish official Allen Apsley. Francis Wenman matriculated at Trinity College, Cambridge as "Wainman" in Autumn 1615 and was knighted as "Wayneman" on 8 June 1618. He began his legal education at the Middle Temple in 1618. In 1633 he purchased Lew manor at Bampton.

In 1628, Wenman was elected Member of Parliament for Oxfordshire and sat until 1629 when King Charles decided to rule without parliament for eleven years. He was re-elected MP for Oxfordshire for the Short Parliament in April 1640. According to his friend Edward Hyde, Wenman was ‘esteemed in Court’ and ‘equal to the greatest trust and employment, if he had been ambitious of it, or solicitous for it’. He had ‘a competent estate’ in Oxfordshire, including the ancestral home of his family, and ‘his reputation of wisdom and integrity gave him an interest and credit in that country much above his fortune’.

Wenman died on 26 June 1640 at the age of 40 and was buried at Witney with his ancestors.

== Family ==
Wenman married Ann Sandys, daughter of Sir Samuel Sandys of Ombersley, Worcestershire. His son Francis became a baronet. His daughter Anne married Sir John Fettiplace, 1st Baronet.

== Notes ==
Parliament of England
Preceded by Hon. James Fiennes; Thomas Wenman	Member of Parliament for Oxfordshire; 1628–1629; With: Hon. James Fiennes	Parliament suspended until 1640
Vacant Parliament suspended since 1629	Member of Parliament for Oxfordshire; 1640; With: Hon. James Fiennes	Succeeded by Hon. James Fiennes; The Viscount Wenman
