= Francis Norreys (1609–1669) =

English politician

Sir Francis Norreys (1609–1669) was an English politician.

== Biography ==
Norreys was the illegitimate son of Francis Norris, 1st Earl of Berkshire and Sarah Rose. On his father's death in 1622, Norreys inherited the manors of Weston-on-the-Green and Yattendon with lands at Cherrington and Chilswell. In 1633 he was knighted at Abingdon-on-Thames and 1635–6 he served as High Sheriff of Oxfordshire.

In 1656, Norreys was elected as a Member of Parliament for Oxfordshire in the Second Protectorate Parliament. He was returned for the same seat to the Third Protectorate Parliament in 1658, but in February of that year the return was declared invalid by the House of Commons of England and Viscount Falkland was elected in his place.

By his wife Hester, daughter of Sir John Rouse, Norreys was the father of Sir Edward Norreys.

Parliament of England
| Preceded by Robert Jenkinson; Charles Fleetwood; Colonel James Whitelocke; Nathaniel Fiennes; William Lenthall | Member of Parliament for Oxfordshire; 1656–1658; With: Robert Jenkinson; Lord Deputy Charles Fleetwood; William Lenthall; Miles Fleetwood | Succeeded by Robert Jenkinson; Viscount Falkland |
