= Vote of No Addresses =

The Vote of No Addresses was a measure passed on 17 January 1648 by the English Long Parliament when it broke off negotiations with King Charles I. The vote was in response to the news that Charles I was entering into an engagement with the Scots. Oliver Cromwell in particular urged that no new negotiations be opened with Charles and the vote was carried by 141 to 91. This led to the support of the general council on 8 January and a hitherto reluctant House of Lords convening a committee to approve it on 13 January.

By September 1648 the Second Civil War had been fought and the Royalists, the English Presbyterians, and their Scottish allies had been defeated by the New Model Army at Preston. The Army, now in the ascendancy, wished to resume negotiations with the king so Parliament repealed the measure in September 1648.

The Lords and Commons assembled in Parliament, after many addresses to His Majesty for the preventing and ending of this unnatural war raised by him against his Parliament and kingdom, having lately sent Four Bills to His Majesty which did contain only matter of safety and security to the Parliament and kingdom, referring the composure of all other differences to a personal treaty with His Majesty; and having received an absolute negative, do hold themselves obliged to use their utmost endeavours speedily to settle the present government in such a way as may bring the greatest security to this kingdom in the enjoyment of the laws and liberties thereof; and in order thereunto, and that the House may receive no delays nor interruptions in so great and necessary a work, they have taken these resolutions, and passed these votes, viz.:

1. That the Lords and Commons do declare that they will make no further addresses or applications to the King.
2. That no application or addresses be made to the King by any person whatsoever, without the leave of both Houses.
3. That the person or persons that shall make breach of this order shall incur the penalties of high treason.
4. That the two Houses declare they will receive no more any message from the King; and do enjoin that no person whatsoever do presume to receive or bring any message from the King to both or either of the Houses of Parliament, or to any other person.

— January 17, 1647/8. Old Parliamentary History, xvi. 489. See Great Civil War, iv. 50–53.

== See also ==
- The failed Treaty of Newport September 1648.
