= John Fiennes =

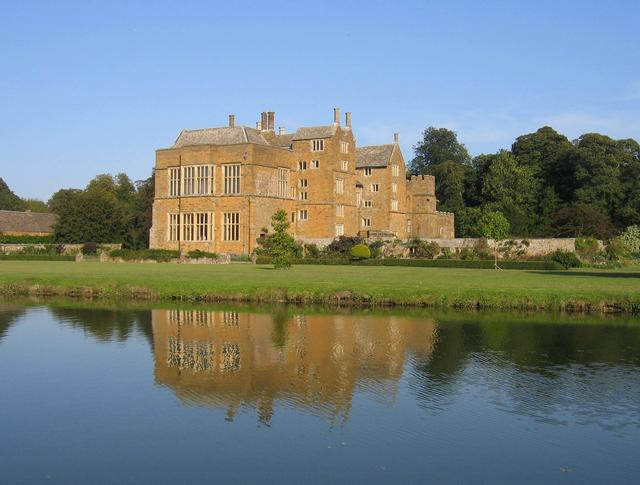
- Broughton Castle, where John Fiennes was born

Member of Parliament for Morpeth
- In office April 1645 – December 1648 (Excluded by Pride's Purge)

Personal details
- Born: c. 1612 Broughton Castle, Oxfordshire
- Died: 1 June 1708 (aged 96)
- Spouse: Susannah Hobbs (After 1670–his death)
- Relations: Nathaniel Fiennes (brother)
- Children: Laurence (1690–1742), Fifth Viscount Saye and Sele
- Occupation: Politician

Military service
- Allegiance: Parliamentarian
- Rank: Colonel
- Battles/wars: First English Civil War; Powick Bridge; Edgehill; Storming of Bristol; Siege of Banbury Castle; Battle of Naseby

John Fiennes (c. 1612–1708) was the third son of Puritan noble and politician William Fiennes, 1st Viscount Saye and Sele. He served in the Parliamentarian army during the First English Civil War, before resigning his commission when elected MP for Morpeth in 1645. Excluded from Parliament by Pride's Purge in December 1648, he largely avoided politics thereafter but was appointed to Cromwell's Upper House in 1658.

== Personal details ==
John Fiennes was born c. 1612, probably at the family home of Broughton Castle in Oxfordshire, third son of the Puritan peer and politician William Fiennes, 1st Viscount Saye and Sele (1582–1662), and his wife Elizabeth Temple (died 1648). He had two elder brothers James (1602–1674) and Nathaniel (c. 1608–1669), to whom he was especially close, and three sisters, Bridget, Constance and Elizabeth.

At some point after 1670, he married Susannah Hobbs (1657–1715); their fifth and only surviving son, Lawrence (1690–1742), succeeded his cousin as Fifth Viscount Saye and Sele in January 1710, by which date Fiennes had died.

== Career ==
At the outbreak of the First English Civil War he joined the Parliamentarian side, and rose to the rank of the colonel of a regiment of horse by 1643, and served at the Battle of Naseby.

He was elected to the Long Parliament as member for Morpeth, probably in 1645, but was one of the MPs excluded in Pride's Purge in December 1648. In 1658, he was chosen a member of Cromwell's Upper House.

== Sources ==
- Kelsey, Sean (2004). "Fiennes, John, appointed Lord Fiennes under the protectorate". Oxford Dictionary of National Biography (online ed.). Oxford University Press. doi:10.1093/ref:odnb/9412. (Subscription, Wikipedia Library access or UK public library membership required.)
- Concise Dictionary of National Biography (1930)
- D. Brunton & D. H. Pennington, Members of the Long Parliament (London: George Allen & Unwin, 1954)
- Cobbett's Parliamentary history of England, from the Norman Conquest in 1066 to the year 1803 (London: Thomas Hansard, 1808)
- Mark Noble, Memoirs of several persons and families... allied to or descended from... the Protectorate-House of Cromwell (Birmingham: Pearson & Rollason, 1784)

Parliament of England
Preceded by John Fenwick; Sir William Carnaby	Member of Parliament for Morpeth; 1645–1648; With: George Fenwick	Succeeded by Not represented in Rump Parliament
