= Agnes Wenman =

Agnes, Viscountess Wenman (died 1617) was an English Roman Catholic woman, under suspicion of involvement at the time of the Gunpowder Plot of 1605. She is correctly referred to either as Agnes Wenman or as Lady Wenman.

== Life ==
She was the eldest surviving daughter of Sir George Fermor of Easton Neston in Northamptonshire, by his wife Mary, daughter and heiress of Thomas Curzon. She came of a Catholic family, and was identified by the Rev. John Morris with the lady at whose house John Gerard, the Jesuit missionary, while disguised as a layman, had a keen discussion with George Abbot, the future archbishop; it was on the eternal state of a puritan who threw himself from a church steeple because he was assured of salvation.

She was a friend of Mrs Elizabeth Vaux, the sister-in-law of Anne Vaux, the ally of Henry Garnet. In consequence of some correspondence between them, suspicion fell on Lady Wenman at the time of the Gunpowder Plot, and she and her husband Richard Wenman, 1st Viscount Wenman, were separately examined in December 1605. Sir Richard testified that he "disliked their intercourse, because Mrs. Vaux tried to pervert his wife." She was set at liberty after a short confinement in custody. She was buried at Twyford on 4 July 1617.

She is noted as the translator of the works of Johannes Zonaras from the French of Jean de Maulmont. The translation is preserved in manuscript.
