= Robert Yeamans =

English merchant

Robert Yeamans or Yeomans (died 1643) was an English merchant of Bristol who in early 1643 plotted with other Royalists to aid in the capture of Bristol by the Royalists. The plot was discovered by the parliamentary governor Nathaniel Fiennes and Yeomans was tried as a traitor, found guilty by court-martial and executed.

== Early life ==
Yeamans came of a numerous Bristol family, and was probably closely related to William Yeamans (1578–1632?), a graduate of Balliol College, Oxford, incumbent of St. Philip's, Bristol, where he was noted as a puritan, and from 1615 till his death prebendary of Bristol Cathedral.

Robert Yeamans was a well-known merchant and councillor of Bristol, and in 1641–2 served as sheriff. He was royalist in his sympathies, and he obtained a commission from King Charles I of England to raise troops from Bristol, but in December, before he could accomplish the task, the city was occupied by a parliamentary force under the command of Colonel Essex. In February 1643 Nathaniel Fiennes became the parliamentary military governor of the city. (Note: Dates are in the Julian calendar with the start of year adjusted to 1 January (see Old Style and New Style dates))

== Plot ==
Early in 1643 Yeamans conceived a plan for turning the city over to a royalist army under the command of Prince Rupert. He communicated with Charles I, who was then at Oxford, and the king sent him a commission to enlist men in his service. Prince Rupert was to bring four thousand horse and two thousand foot to Durdham Down, and the royalists in Bristol, who were estimated at two thousand, were to seize the Frome-gate and admit Rupert's forces. The plot was to take effect on the night of 7 March 1643.

Fiennes heard of the plot, and on 7 March, before they could execute the plan, Yeamans and his principal confederates were arrested in his house on Wine Street. A Brief Relation of the Plot was published by parliament on 13 March, various witnesses were examined in March and April, and on 8 May Yeamans was condemned to death by a court-martial as a traitor.

Charles made great efforts to save him, and Lord Forth threatened to execute a similar number of parliamentary prisoners in his hands. The threat proved useless, as Fiennes also held other notable Royalist prisoners recently captured by Sir William Waller on his raid into Herefordshire, so to forestall a blood bath King Charles ordered that no retaliatory executions should take place.

Yeamans was hanged, drawn and quartered opposite his house along with his co-conspirator and friend George Bouchier. Yeamans's remains were buried in Christ Church, Bristol. When Fiennes was himself on his trial his execution of Yeamans was one of the charges brought against him by Prynne.

== Family ==
Yeaman is said in the Royalist accounts to have left by his wife, a kinswoman also named Yeamans, eight very young children, and a ninth was born posthumously. (Note: The eldest son is said to have been Sir John Yeamans, and the second Sir Robert Yeamans, who, like his brother, was created a baronet on 31 December 1666 and died without issue, being buried in St. Mary Redclyffe, Bristol, on 7 Feb 1686–7. But both affiliations are fictitious; Sir John was born not later than 1611, and Sir Robert was baptised on 19 April 1617, and both were apparently sons of John Yeamans, brewer, of Redcliffe, whose will is dated 1645 (Pollard 2008).) Many other members of the family are mentioned as taking prominent part in local affairs at Bristol and at Barbados. The only child of the Royalist whose relationship to him is established is his daughter Anne, who married [Thomas Curtis], the quaker of Reading, and interceded for George Fox's release in 1660. Other members of the Yeamans family were Quakers, and one of them married Isabel, daughter of Margaret Fell, and stepdaughter of Fox.

== Notes ==
Footnotes

Citations
