= William Fiennes, 1st Viscount Saye and Sele =

English nobleman and politician (1582–1662)

The Right Honourable The Viscount Saye and Sele
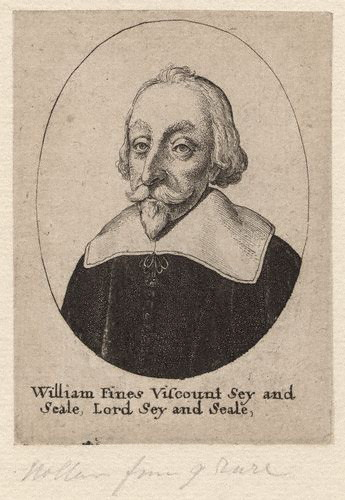
- Engraving of Lord Saye by Wenceslas Hollar, mid-seventeenth century.
- Born: 28 June 1582; Broughton, Oxfordshire, England
- Died: 14 April 1662 (aged 79); Broughton, Oxfordshire, England
- Burial place: Broughton, Oxfordshire
- Spouse: Elizabeth Temple of Stowe
- Children: James Fiennes, 2nd Viscount Saye and Sele; Nathaniel Fiennes; John Fiennes; Bridget Clinton, Countess of Lincoln
- Parent(s): Richard Fiennes, 7th Baron Saye and Sele, Constance Kingsmill

William Fiennes, 1st Viscount Saye and Sele (28 June 1582 – 14 April 1662) was an English nobleman and politician. He was a leading critic of Charles I's rule during the 1620s and 1630s. He was known also for his involvement in several companies for setting up overseas colonies.

== Early life ==
He was born at the family home of Broughton Castle near Banbury, in Oxfordshire, the only son of Richard Fiennes, 7th Baron Saye and Sele, and his wife Constance, daughter of Sir William Kingsmill. He was educated at New College, Oxford. He was a descendant and heir of the sister of William of Wykeham, the college's founder. Fiennes succeeded to his father's barony in 1613.

== 1620s ==
During the latter part of James I's reign, Saye was one of the most prominent opponents of the court. In 1621 he was active against Francis Bacon, and urged that he should be degraded from the peerage. In 1622 he opposed the benevolence levied by the king, saying that he knew no law besides parliament to persuade men to give away their own goods; he spent six months in the Fleet Prison, and then had a period of house arrest. When George Villiers, 1st Duke of Buckingham returned from Spain and proposed to break the Spanish match, the duke and baron became temporary allies. Saye became Viscount Saye and Sele in 1624. He pressed home the attack on Lionel Cranfield, 1st Earl of Middlesex.

In the parliament of 1626, Saye was back in opposition; he defended the privileges of the peerage against the new king Charles I in the cases of John Digby, 1st Earl of Bristol and Thomas Howard, 21st Earl of Arundel, and intervened on behalf of Dudley Digges when Buckingham accused him of speaking treason. In the autumn of the same year, he was among those who refused to pay the forced loan. In the parliament of 1628, he employed with success the right of peers to protest. In the debates on the Petition of Right, he opposed the reservations and amendments of the court party.

== Colonist ==
During the personal rule of Charles I, Saye devoted time and money to schemes of colonisation: his motives were in part financial, but also religious and political.

=== Providence Island ===
In 1630 he established, together with Robert Greville, 2nd Baron Brooke, John Pym, and others from the group of Puritan entrepreneurs, a company to settle the Providence Island colony. It was to be developed on what is now known as Isla de Providencia in the Caribbean Sea, part of the Archipelago of San Andrés, Providencia and Santa Catalina, and a department of the nation of Colombia.

=== New England ===
Saye obtained a patent for a large tract of land on the Connecticut River on 19 March 1632 from Robert Rich, 2nd Earl of Warwick and the New England Company, again in association with Lord Brooke and ten others.

They appointed John Winthrop the Younger to act as governor and established a fort at the mouth of the river, to which they gave the name of "Sayebrook." Next they sent over a shipload of colonists. In 1633, Saye and Brooke also purchased a plantation at Cocheco or Dover, in what is now New Hampshire, from some Bristol merchants.

The two men both contemplated settling in New England, but they demanded that an emigrant hereditary aristocracy be established as a preliminary, from which the governors were to be chosen. After Saye's constitutional idea received a hostile reception, the partners in the colony compromised to obtain colonists.

=== Aftermath ===
Saye concentrated his energies on the settlement of Providence Island, while spreading disparaging reports about New England, including its climate and land. He soon abandoned his enterprises there and surrendered his rights. The New Hampshire settlements were made over to Massachusetts in 1641, and Sayebrook was sold to Connecticut three years later.

Saye was one of the commissioners for the government from Westminster of the plantations appointed on 2 November 1643.

Old Saybrook, Connecticut is named after Viscount Saye and Lord Brooke.

== 1630s politics ==
Leading puritans, including John Pym, who were members of the Providence Island Company met Saye at Broughton Castle to coordinate their opposition to the King. On several occasions, Saye outwitted the advisers of Charles I by his strict compliance with legal forms, earning him the nickname "old subtlety".

Although Saye resisted the levy of ship money, he accompanied Charles on his march against the Scots in 1639; but, with only one other peer, he refused to take the oath binding him to fight for the king "to the utmost of my power and hazard of my life". Then Charles I sought to win his favour by making him a Privy Councillor and Master of the Court of Wards.

He was the uncle and patron of Henry Parker whose early works are close to Saye's direct political concerns.

== Civil War and Restoration ==
When the Civil War broke out, however, Saye was on the Committee of Safety. He was appointed as Lord Lieutenant of Gloucestershire, Oxfordshire and Cheshire, and raised a regiment that briefly occupied Oxford. However, "during his brief occupation of the city he neglected to fortify it against the king, fearing to anger the university" and the Royalists seized Oxford shortly afterwards.

Saye was a member of the Committee of Both Kingdoms. He was mainly responsible for passing the self-denying ordinance through the House of Lords; and in 1647 stood up for the army in its struggle with the parliament.

In 1648, both at the treaty of Newport and elsewhere, Saye was anxious that Charles should come to terms. After the king was executed, Saye retired into private life. In 1656 he recovered £500 damages from James Whinnel, gentleman of Wisbech. He agreed to donate £100 to the town of Wisbech in the Isle of Ely, with the interest to be used for providing clothing for the poor and administered by his son Richard Fiennes.

Saye became a privy counsellor again upon the restoration of Charles II. He died at Broughton Castle on 14 April 1662.

== Family ==
Fiennes married Elizabeth, youngest daughter of John Temple of Stowe, in 1600. She was born in May 1585 and was about fifteen at marriage. Their eldest son James (c. 1603–1674) succeeded him as 2nd viscount; other sons were the Parliamentarians Nathaniel Fiennes and John Fiennes. His daughter Bridget married her remote cousin Theophilus Clinton, 4th Earl of Lincoln, son of the 3rd Earl of Lincoln. Another daughter Ann married Sir Charles Wolseley, 2nd Baronet.

The viscounty of Saye and Sele became extinct in 1781, and the barony was subsequently held by the descendants of John Twisleton (died 1682) and his wife Elizabeth (died 1674), a daughter of the 2nd viscount.

== Ancestry ==
Ancestors of William Fiennes, 1st Viscount Saye and Sele

Edward Fiennes, 5th Baron Saye and Sele
Richard Fiennes of Broughton, 6th Baron Saye and Sele
Margaret Danvers
Richard Fiennes, 7th Baron Saye and Sele
Richard Fermour
Ursula Fermor
Anne Browne
William Fiennes
Sir John Kingsmill of Sidmanton
Sir William Kingsmill of Sidmanton
Constance or Elizabeth Goring
Constance Kingsmill
George Raleigh
Bridget Raleigh
Joan or Jane Coningsby

== Notes ==
Peerage of England
New creation	Viscount Saye and Sele; 1624–1662	Succeeded by James Fiennes
Preceded by Richard Fiennes	Baron Saye and Sele; 1613–1662	Succeeded by James Fiennes
