= Thomas Wenman, 2nd Viscount Wenman =

English landowner and politician

Thomas Wenman, 2nd Viscount Wenman (1596 – 25 January 1665), was an English landowner and politician who sat in the House of Commons at various times between 1621 and 1660.

Wenman was the only son of Richard Wenman, 1st Viscount Wenman, by Agnes, eldest surviving daughter of Sir George Fermor, of Easton Neston, Northamptonshire. He took part in the settlement of Ireland and was granted lands in Garrycastle in the King's County. He also sat as Member of Parliament for Brackley from 1621 to 1622 and 1624 to 1625 and for Oxfordshire in 1626, from November 1640 to 1648 and in 1660. He was appointed by the Long Parliament to be one of the commissioners to carry the propositions for peace to Charles at Oxford in 1643 and was also a commissioner for the Treaty of Uxbridge in 1645 and the Treaty of Newport in 1648. In 1645 he was granted £4 a week by Parliament for damages caused by the King's forces at his Oxfordshire estate.

Lord Wenman married Margaret, daughter of Edmund Hampden. He died without surviving male issue in January 1665 and was succeeded by his younger brother, Philip.

Parliament of England
Preceded by William Spencer; Arthur Terringham	Member of Parliament for Brackley; 1621–1625; With: Edward Spencer	Succeeded by Sir John Hobart; John Crew
Preceded by Sir William Cope; Sir Richard Wenman	Member of Parliament for Oxfordshire; 1626; With: Hon. James Fiennes	Succeeded by Hon. James Fiennes; Sir Francis Wenman
Preceded by Sir John Hobart; John Crew	Member of Parliament for Brackley; 1628–1629; With: John Curzon	Parliament suspended until 1640
Parliament suspended since 1629	Member of Parliament for Brackley; 1640; With: Sir Martin Lister	Succeeded by John Crew; Sir Martin Lister
Preceded by Hon. James Fiennes; Sir Francis Wenman	Member of Parliament for Oxfordshire; 1640–1648; With: Hon. James Fiennes	Not represented in Rump Parliament
Not represented in restored Rump	Member of Parliament for Oxfordshire; 1660; With: Hon. James Fiennes	Succeeded by The Viscount Falkland; Sir Anthony Cope
Peerage of Ireland
Preceded by Richard Wenman	Viscount Wenman; 1640–1668	Succeeded by Philip Wenman
