= George Bouchier =

George Bouchier or Bourchier (died 1643) was a wealthy merchant of Bristol who supported the royalist cause during the English Civil War.

Bourchier entered into a plot with Robert Yeamans, who had been one of the sheriffs of Bristol, and several others, to deliver that city, on 7 March 1643, to Prince Rupert, for the service of King Charles I; but the scheme being discovered and frustrated, he was, with Yeamans, after eleven weeks' imprisonment, brought to trial before a council of war. They were both found guilty and hanged, drawn and quartered in Wine Street, Bristol, on 30 May 1643.

In his speech to the populace at the place of execution Bouchier exhorted all those who had set their hands to the plough (meaning the defence of the royal cause) not to be terrified by his and his fellow-prisoner's sufferings into withdrawing their exertions in the king's service. There is a small portrait of Bouchier in the preface to William Winstanley's Loyall Martyrology, 1665.
