= Treaty of Newport =

1648 failed treaty to end the English Civil War

Treaty of Newport (after the painting by G. Cattermole, 1852)

The Treaty of Newport was a failed treaty between Parliament and King Charles I of England, intended to bring an end to the hostilities of the English Civil War. Negotiations were conducted between 15 September 1648 and 27 November 1648, at Newport, Isle of Wight, on the initial proviso that they would not take longer than forty days (negotiations had effectively broken down by 27 October but continued formally to November). Charles was released on parole from his confinement at Carisbrooke Castle and lodged in Newport.

Charles began proceedings by withdrawing his declarations against Parliament but also insisted that no concessions he made should be valid until a complete scheme of settlement should be arranged; this led to an air of unreality from the beginning. This is heightened by the fact that Charles secretly sent word to James Butler, 1st Marquis of Ormond not to abide by any settlement reached at Newport.

Parliament appointed fifteen Commissioners. Denzil Holles led a faction that represented a more conservative, Presbyterian interest, and were more inclined for a settlement that favoured the Crown. Henry Vane the Younger led a faction that represented a more moderate, Independent interest, and though they were by no means radical, they acted to secure a settlement which would guarantee the rights gained by Parliament in the Puritan Revolution. It was the influence of the Presbyterians that led to the Parliamentary decision to rescind the Vote of No Addresses from earlier in 1648 in order to allow the talks to occur.

Presbyterian and Middle Group MPs were prepared to continue negotiating with Charles in order to reach a permanent settlement. However, Army radicals had lost patience with him and grew angry when Parliament appeared willing to allow him to come to London to complete the settlement and Vane and Henry Ireton decided to return Charles to Hurst Castle on the mainland.

The purged Parliament annulled the Treaty of Newport on 13 December 1648 and preparations for the trial went ahead.

== List of commissioners ==
Presbyterian

1. Denzil Holles
2. John Glynne
3. John Crewe
4. John Potts
5. John Bulkeley

Independent

1. Henry Vane the Younger
2. Nathaniel Fiennes
3. William Pierrepont
4. Samuel Browne
5. Algernon Percy, 10th Earl of Northumberland
6. William Fiennes, 1st Viscount Saye and Sele

non-aligned

1. Philip Herbert, 4th Earl of Pembroke
2. William Cecil, 2nd Earl of Salisbury
3. James Cranfield, 2nd Earl of Middlesex
4. Thomas Wenman, 2nd Viscount Wenman
