= James Fiennes, 2nd Viscount Saye and Sele =

English peer and MP

The Right Honourable James Fiennes, 2nd Viscount Saye and Sele
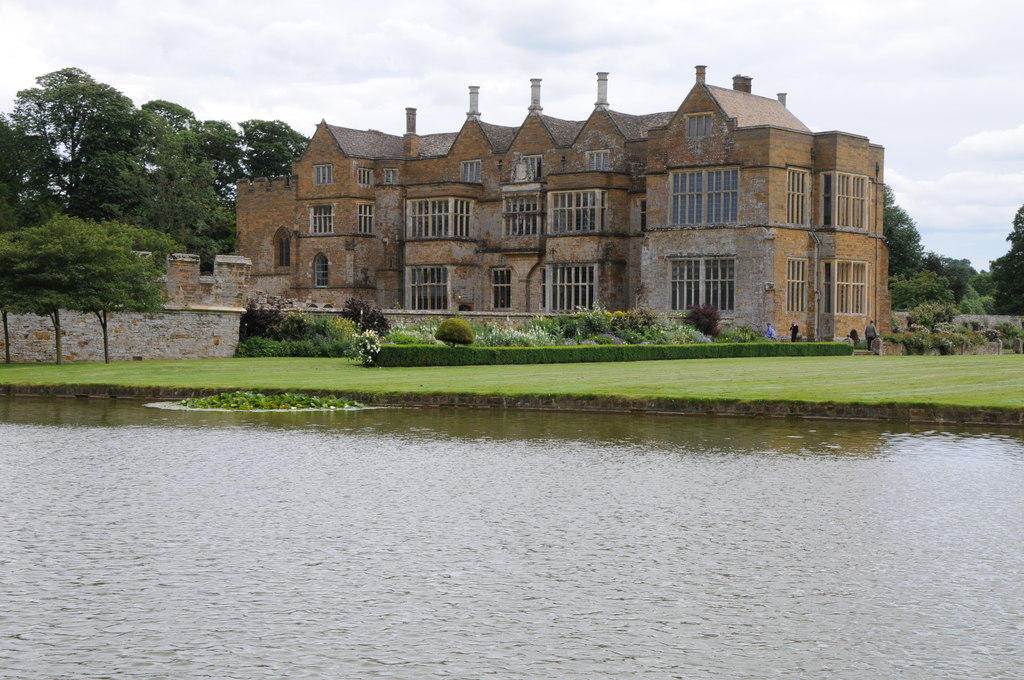
- Broughton Castle, the family home

Lord Lieutenant of Oxfordshire
- In office March 1668 – March 1674

Member of Parliament for Oxfordshire in the Convention Parliament
- In office April 1660 – December 1660

Member of Parliament for Oxfordshire
- In office 1626 through 1629 (Parliament suspended) – April 1640 to December 1648; Excluded by Pride's Purge

Member of Parliament for Banbury
- In office June 1625 – August 1625

Personal details
- Born: c. 1602 Broughton Castle, Oxfordshire
- Died: 15 March 1674 (aged 72) Broughton Castle, Oxfordshire
- Spouse: Frances Cecil (c. 1631–his death)
- Children: Frances; Elizabeth (died 1674)
- Education: Queens' College, Cambridge; Lincoln's Inn
- Occupation: Peer and politician

James Fiennes, 2nd Viscount Saye and Sele (c. 1602 – 15 March 1674) was an English peer and MP at various times between 1625 and 1660, when he succeeded his father and entered the House of Lords.

== Personal details ==
James Fiennes was born c. 1602 at Broughton Castle, Oxfordshire, eldest son of William Fiennes, 1st Viscount Saye and Sele (1582–1662), and his wife Elizabeth Temple (died 1648). His siblings included Nathaniel (1608–1669), Bridget, John (1612–1708), Constance and Elizabeth.

Sometime before 1631, Fiennes married Frances Cecil (died 1684), daughter of Edward Cecil, 1st Viscount Wimbledon. They had three sons, all of whom died as infants, plus two daughters, Frances and Elizabeth (died 1674). In the absence of a direct male heir, his nephew William (1639–1698), son of his younger brother Nathaniel, became the third Viscount Saye and Sele on his death in 1674.

== Career ==
In 1625, Fiennes was elected Member of Parliament for Banbury. He was elected MP for Oxfordshire in 1626 and in 1628 and sat until 1629 when King Charles decided to rule without parliament for eleven years. In April 1640 he was re-elected MP for Oxfordshire in the Short Parliament. He was re-elected MP for Oxfordshire in November 1640 for the Long Parliament and sat until 1648.

In 1660, Fiennes was elected Member of Parliament for Oxfordshire in the Convention Parliament. He succeeded to the viscountcy on the death of his father in 1662. He was Lord Lieutenant of Oxfordshire from 1668 until his death.

== Sources ==
- Cracroft-Brennan, Patrick, ed. (2013), "Saye and Sele, Baron (E, 1603)", Cracroft's Peerage, Heraldic Media
- Dunkin, John (1844), The History and Antiquities of Dartford, with Topographical Notices of the Neighbourhood, John Russell Smith, pp. 296
- * Helms, Mark (1983). FIENNES, Hon. James (c.1602-74), of Broughton Castle, Oxon in The History of Parliament: the House of Commons 1660-1690. CUP. ISBN 978-1107002258.

Parliament of England
Preceded by Sir William Cope, Bt	Member of Parliament for Banbury; 1625	Succeeded by Calcot Chambre
Preceded by Edward Wray; Sir Richard Wenman	Member of Parliament for Oxfordshire; 1626–1629; With: Sir Thomas Wenman 1626; Sir Francis Wenman 1628–1629	Parliament suspended until 1640
Vacant Parliament suspended since 1629	Member of Parliament for Oxfordshire; 1640–1648; With: The Viscount Wenman	Not represented in Rump Parliament
Vacant Not represented in Rump Parliament	Member of Parliament for Oxfordshire; 1660–1661; With: The Viscount Wenman	Succeeded by The Viscount Falkland; Sir Anthony Cope
Honorary titles
Preceded by The Earl of Clarendon	Lord Lieutenant of Oxfordshire; 1668–1674	Succeeded by The Lord Norreys
Peerage of England
Preceded by William Fiennes	Viscount Saye and Sele; 1662–1674	Succeeded by William Fiennes
Preceded by William Fiennes	Baron Saye and Sele; 1662–1674	Abeyant; Terminated in favour of Thomas Twisleton
