= Richard Wenman, 1st Viscount Wenman =

English soldier and politician (1573–1640)

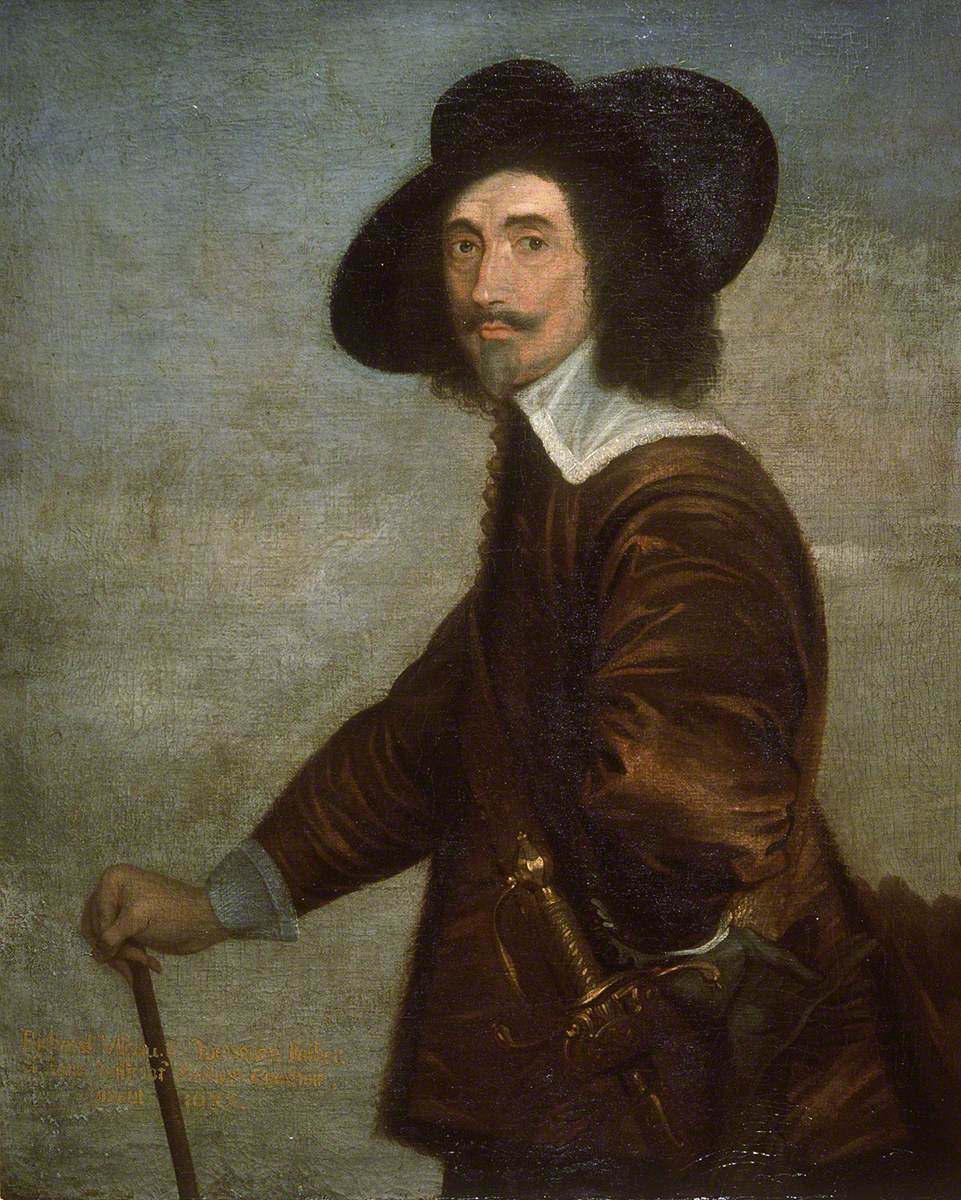
Richard Wenman

Richard Wenman, 1st Viscount Wenman (1573–1640), was an English soldier and politician who sat in the House of Commons between 1621 and 1625. He was created Viscount Wenman in the Peerage of Ireland in 1628.

== Life ==
Wenman was the eldest son of Thomas Wenman (died 1577) of Thame Park, Oxfordshire, and his wife Jane West, daughter of William West, 1st Baron De La Warr, who married at St Dunstan in the West, London on 9 June 1572. His father is mistakenly called Richard by Burke. Following his father's death, his mother remarried to James Cressy of Beaconsfield (died 1581), then (in January 1587/88) to Thomas Tasburgh of Hawridge, Buckinghamshire (died 1602–03), and lastly to Ralph Sheldon, Esquire (1537-1613) of Beoley, Worcestershire. Dame Jane Tasburghe (née West)'s last will and testament was proved in 1621.

Richard Wenman matriculated at the University of Oxford on 8 December 1587 as 'Mr. Case's scholar.' Wenman served as a volunteer soldier and behaved with great gallantry when Cádiz was captured in 1596. He was knighted by Robert Devereux, 2nd Earl of Essex, at Cádiz.

Wenman was elected Member of Parliament for Oxfordshire on 20 December 1620, and was elected again in 1625. In 1627 he was High Sheriff of Oxfordshire. He was created Baron Wenman of Kilmainham, County Meath, and Viscount Wenman of Tuam by letters patent, dated 30 July 1628.

Wenman was a patron of the poet William Basse, who dedicated several poems to him, including his collection Clio, describing him as a modern Maecenas,

Never Maecenas bred more nobly true:
And O what virtue more, than life to give
To verse, whereby all other virtues live?

Wenman died on 3 April 1640, and was buried at Twyford on 7 April.

== Family ==
Wenman married four times. His first wife was Agnes Fermor. By her he had two surviving sons, Thomas Wenman, 2nd Viscount Wenman, and Philip (died 20 April 1696), who succeeded as third viscount; and four daughters. After her death, he married Alice Chamberlayne, widow of Robert Chamberlayne and a lady of some wealth, on 4 November 1618 at St. Bartholomew the Great, London. His third wife, Elizabeth, was buried at Twyford on 27 April 1629. His fourth wife was Mary Keble, daughter of Thomas Keble of Essex, and she was buried at Twyford on 28 July 1638.

Parliament of England
Preceded by Sir Anthony Cope, 1st Baronet; Sir John Croke	Member of Parliament for Oxfordshire; 1621–1622; With: Sir William Cope	Succeeded by Sir William Cope; Sir Henry Poole
Preceded by Sir William Cope; Sir Henry Poole	Member of Parliament for Oxfordshire; 1625; With: Edward Wray	Succeeded by Hon. James Fiennes; Sir Thomas Wenman
Peerage of Ireland
New creation	Viscount Wenman; 1628–1640	Succeeded by Thomas Wenman
