= Twyford, Buckinghamshire =

Village in Buckinghamshire, England

Coordinates: 51.932°N 1.035°W

Twyford
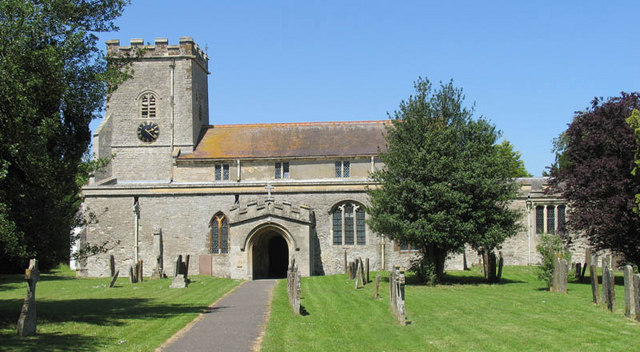
- Parish church of the Assumption

- Location within Buckinghamshire
- Population: 566 (2011 Census)
- OS grid reference: SP6626
- Civil parish: Twyford
- Unitary authority: Buckinghamshire
- Ceremonial county: Buckinghamshire
- Region: South East
- Country: England
- Sovereign state: United Kingdom
- Post town: Buckingham
- Postcode district: MK18
- Dialling code: 01296
- Police: Thames Valley
- Fire: Buckinghamshire
- Ambulance: South Central
- UK Parliament: Mid Buckinghamshire
- Website: Twyford Parish Council

Twyford is a village and civil parish in the Buckinghamshire district of the county of Buckinghamshire, England. It is about 2 miles (3 km) west of Steeple Claydon and 4 miles (6.4 km) northeast of Bicester in Oxfordshire.

Twyford's toponym is derived from the Old English for "double ford". It is a common name in England.

The village has a Church of England parish church, a URC chapel and a Church of England primary school. There is one public house, one general store which is community owned and run by volunteers.

== Parish church ==
The Church of England parish church of the Assumption of the Blesséd Virgin Mary is 12th-century, with four-bay 13th-century nave arcades and a 14th-century west tower. Monuments in the church include a large baroque one in the south aisle commemorating Richard Wenman, 1st Viscount Wenman, and a smaller one to his father Thomas Wenman.

The tower has a ring of six bells. The fifth bell was cast by an unidentified bellfounder in about 1599. W&J Taylor cast the treble bell in 1828 at their then foundry in Oxford. William Blew and Sons of Birmingham cast the fourth bell in 1869. Gillett & Johnston of Croydon cast the treble, second and third bells in 1907. There is also a Sanctus bell that was cast in about 1699.

The church is a Grade I listed building.

== Amenities ==
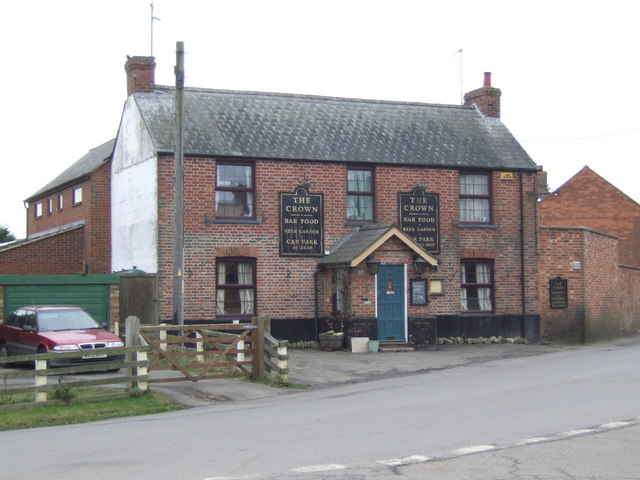
The Crown Inn

Twyford's one public house is The Crown Inn. There used to be three, but The Red Lion was converted and closed in 1994 and The Seven Stars was converted and closed soon after.

Twyford Church of England School is a mixed, voluntary controlled infants' school for the 4–11 age range. The school once taught as few as 25 pupils, but has since recovered to its highest class numbers ever, at just over 100.

Twyford Village Stores is a community shop and coffee shop ran by volunteers. A community shop opened on Main Street, however the community shop then moved into a temporary building after closing in 2010. Twyford Village Stores replaced this building as the location for the community shop in 2014, after being unveiled by John Bercow, the former local MP.

== Notable residents ==
Two brothers who achieved high episcopal office, Euseby Cleaver (1746–1819), Archbishop of Dublin, and William Cleaver (1742–1815), Bishop of Bangor, were born in Twyford, where their father was headmaster of the local boys' school.

In 1944, the Vicar of Twyford, Reverend Sergeant and his wife had a son, John Sergeant, who went on to become a political broadcaster and a contestant in the TV programme, Strictly Come Dancing.
