= Sir Charles Wolseley, 2nd Baronet =

English politician

Sir Charles Wolseley, 2nd Baronet (c. 1630 – 9 October 1714), of Wolseley in Staffordshire, was an English politician who sat in the House of Commons at various times between 1653 and 1660. He held high office during the Commonwealth.

== Life ==
Wolseley was the eldest son of Sir Robert Wolseley, who had been created a baronet by Charles I in 1628, and succeeded to the baronetcy on 21 September 1646. He entered Parliament as Member of Parliament for Oxfordshire in the nominated Barebones Parliament of 1653, and on the establishment of the Protectorate later the same year was appointed to the Council of State. He was subsequently elected for Staffordshire in the First and Second Parliaments of the Protectorate. In 1658, he was appointed to Cromwell's new Upper House. He represented Stafford in the Convention Parliament of 1660, and was pardoned at the Restoration. Thereafter, he retired from public life, and published a number of pamphlets on ecclesiastical matters.

In 1685, Wolseley was arrested on suspicion of complicity in Monmouth's Rebellion, but was subsequently released.

He was buried in Westminster Abbey, and, unlike many of his contemporaries, not disinterred after the reformation. Dean Stanley describes his earthen grave in the southern portion of the Montpensier chapel.

== Family ==
Wolseley married Ann Fiennes, youngest daughter of William, Viscount Saye and Sele and his wife Elizabeth Temple. They had seven sons and ten daughters:

- Robert Wolseley (died 1697), Envoy-Extraordinary to the Governor General of the Spanish Netherlands, died unmarried
- Charles Wolseley, died without issue
- Fiennes Wolseley, died young
- Sir William Wolseley, 3rd Baronet (c. 1660–1728), who as the oldest surviving son succeeded his father
- Sir Henry Wolseley, 4th Baronet (died 1730)
- Captain Richard Wolseley, father of Sir William Wolseley, 5th Baronet
- James Wolseley
- Elizabeth, who married Robert Somervile and was the mother of the poet William Somervile
- Mary, who married Richard Edwards
- Anne, who married John Berry
- Dorothy
- Bridget
- Penelope, died young
- Susan, who married Charles Wedgwood
- Penelope
- Frances
- Constance

Baronetage of England
Preceded by Robert Wolseley	Baronet (of Wolseley); 1646–1714	Succeeded by William Wolseley
