= List of museums in Hampshire =

This list of museums in Hampshire, England contains museums which are defined for this context as institutions (including nonprofit organisations, government entities, and private businesses) that collect and care for objects of cultural, artistic, scientific, or historical interest and make their collections or related exhibits available for public viewing. Also included are non-profit art galleries and university art galleries. Museums that exist only in cyberspace (i.e., virtual museums) are not included.

Name	Image	Town/City	Region	Type	Summary
Aldershot Military Museum		Aldershot	Rushmoor	Military	History of the British Army in Aldershot
Allen Gallery		Alton	East Hampshire	Art	ceramics collection of English, continental and oriental pottery, porcelain and tiles
Andover Museum and Museum of the Iron Age		Andover	Test Valley	Local	local history, natural history, archaeology, art exhibits, culture, industry
Army Physical Training Corps Museum		Aldershot	Rushmoor	Military	photos, militaria and gymnastic equipment used by the Army Physical Training Corps for physically training in the British Army
ArtSway		Sway	New Forest	Art	contemporary visual art centre
Aspex Gallery		Portsmouth	Portsmouth	Art	Contemporary art gallery, located in Gunwharf Quays
Bargate Monument Gallery		Southampton	Southampton	Art	contemporary art gallery
Basing House		Old Basing	Basingstoke and Deane	Historic house	Remains of a Tudor palace, museum displays about the archaeology of Basing House, Tudor and Elizabethan life at Basing, the Civil War and the downfall of Basing
Beaulieu		Beaulieu	New Forest	Multiple	Includes admission to Beaulieu Abbey, Beaulieu Palace House, National Motor Museum, World of Top Gear, James Bond Experience, Secret Army Exhibition, gardens
Beaulieu Abbey		Beaulieu	New Forest	Religious	Remains and artefacts from the 13th century Cistercian abbey
Beaulieu Palace House		Beaulieu	New Forest	Historic house	Former 13th-century Great Gatehouse of Beaulieu Abbey with Victorian additions, gardens
Breamore House		Breamore	New Forest	Multiple	Elizabethan manor house known for paintings and furniture, Breamore Countryside Museum with open air shops and homes, steam powered farm machinery
Buckler's Hard		Bucklers Hard	New Forest	Open air	18th-century Georgian village, includes a maritime museum, historic cottage displays, shipbuilding history, Admiral Horatio Nelson artefacts, World War II efforts
Bursledon Brickworks Museum		Swanwick	Fareham	Industry	Victorian brickworks with steam engine, and working machinery.
Bursledon Windmill		Bursledon	Eastleigh	Mill	Early 19th-century windmill
Butser Ancient Farm		Petersfield	East Hampshire	Agriculture	Working replica of an Iron Age farmstead including simulated pre-Roman roundhouses and a Roman villa
Charles Dickens' Birthplace Museum		Portsmouth	Portsmouth	Historic house	1809 period house where author Charles Dickens was born
Chawton House		Chawton	East Hampshire	Historic house	Restored Elizabethan manor house and garden, home of author Jane Austen's brother Edward Austen Knight, houses the Chawton House Library and Centre for the Study of Early English Women's Writing, 1600–1830
Cumberland House Natural History Museum		Southsea	Portsmouth	Natural history	also known as Portsmouth Natural History Museum, wildlife found in the local riverbank, marshes, woods and urban areas, geology displays, seasonal butterfly house
Curtis Museum		Alton	East Hampshire	Local	Local history, prehistoric tools, Roman and Saxon history and artefacts, toys, culture
The D-Day Story		Southsea	Portsmouth	Military	History of Operation Overlord during the Normandy D-Day landings, features the Overlord Embroidery
Eastney Beam Engine House		Portsmouth	Portsmouth	Technology	Victorian sewage pumping house with two 150 hp James Watt & Co. beam engines
Eling Tide Mill		Eling	New Forest	Mill	Tide-driven watermill dating back to the Middle Ages
Emsworth Museum		Emsworth	Havant	Local	local history, maritime heritage, culture, author P.G. Wodehouse
Explosion! Museum of Naval Firepower		Gosport	Gosport	Military	History of naval firepower from gunpowder to the present
Farnborough Air Sciences Trust Museum		Farnborough	Rushmoor	Aviation	Historic aircraft, jet engines and helicopter rotors, research models of the Concorde, demonstrations of a working wind tunnel, history and science of military and civilian aviation
Flora Twort Gallery		Petersfield	East Hampshire	Art	Works by local artist Flora Twort, historic costumes, changing exhibits of local art
Fordingbridge Museum		Fordingbridge	New Forest	Archaeology	local history, culture, artist Augustus John,
Fort Brockhurst		Gosport	Gosport	Military	Operated by English Heritage, mid-19th-century fort with exhibits of stonework, textiles, jewellery and furniture from many periods from their collections
Fort Nelson		Boarhunt	City of Winchester	Military	1860s fort, features the artillery collection of the Royal Armouries
Furzey Gardens		Minstead	New Forest	Multiple	gardens, art gallery, restored 16th-century thatched forest cottage
Genesis Expo		Portsmouth	Portsmouth	Religious	Creation science display of dinosaurs and dioramas
Gilbert White's House		Selborne	East Hampshire	Historic house	home and garden of 18th-century naturalist Gilbert White, also the Oates Collections about Antarctic explorer Lawrence Oates and his uncle explorer Frank Oates, display of Central American birds
Gliding Heritage Centre		Lasham Airfield	East Hampshire	Aviation museum	web-site Collection of 42 vintage gliders Tours available at Lasham Airfield club-house on Sundays at 2:00pm only
Gosport Discovery Centre		Gosport	Gosport	Multiple	local library, museum of local history, geology, local history, maritime and military heritage, culture, art gallery
The Gurkha Museum		Winchester	City of Winchester	Military	History and memorabilia of the Gurkha service to the British crown, part of Winchester's Military Museums
Highclere Castle		Newbury	Basingstoke and Deane	Historic house	Large Elizabethan country house, park designed by Capability Brown, features Egyptian artefacts from the 5th Earl of Carnarvon
Hinton Ampner		Bramdean	City of Winchester	Historic house	Operated by the National Trust, country house known for its early 20th-century gardens, collection of Georgian and Regency furniture, Italian pictures and objets d'art
Hollycombe Steam Collection		Liphook	East Hampshire	Multiple	Collection of steam-powered vehicles, fairground rides, a display farm and three railways
HorsePower: The Museum of the King's Royal Hussars		Winchester	City of Winchester	Military	History and memorabilia of the King's Royal Hussars, part of Winchester's Military Museums
Hovercraft Museum		Lee-on-the-Solent	Gosport	Transportation	Hovercraft vehicles
Hurst Castle		Milford on Sea	New Forest	Military	One of Henry VIII's Device Forts, features lighthouse museum, coastal gun batteries and searchlights from World War II, military exhibits
Jane Austen's House Museum		Chawton	East Hampshire	Historic house	17th-century house where author Jane Austen wrote Mansfield Park, Emma and Persuasion
John Hansard Gallery		Southampton	Southampton	Art	Part of the University of Southampton, contemporary visual art gallery
Little Woodham		Rowner	Gosport	Living	Recreated mid-17th-century rural village
Manor Farm Country Park		Bursledon	Eastleigh	Living	Victorian period farmstead, schoolroom, wheelwright's shop, blacksmith's forge and 13th-century church
Medieval Merchant's House		Southampton	Southampton	Historic house	Operated by English Heritage, 14th-century period merchant's house
Milestones Museum		Basingstoke	Basingstoke and Deane	Living	Recreated covered network of Victorian and 1930s streets and shops, farm, Thornycroft vehicles, steam and agriculture equipment
Mottisfont Abbey		Mottisfont	Test Valley	Historic house	Operated by the National Trust, includes the Gothic remains of the original 13th-century Augustinian priory with a collection of 20th-century art, gardens
Museum of Army Flying		Stockbridge	Test Valley	Military	History of flying in the British Army
Museum of the Iron Age		Andover	Test Valley	Archaeology	artefacts and recreations of the Danbury hill fort
Museum of Army Chaplaincy		Amport	Test Valley	Military	Located in Amport House, history and memorabilia of the Royal Army Chaplains' Department
Museum of the Adjutant General's Corps		Winchester	City of Winchester	Military	History and memorabilia of the Adjutant General's Corps, part of Winchester's Military Museums
National Motor Museum		Beaulieu	New Forest	Transportation	Automobiles, motorcycles, 1930s garage, motoring history and memorabilia, World of Top Gear, James Bond Experience, other movie vehicles
New Forest Centre		Lyndhurst	New Forest	Multiple	includes the New Forest Museum with exhibits about New Forest Park local history, natural history, culture, geology, forestry, and the New Forest Gallery;
Petersfield Museum		Petersfield	East Hampshire	Local	Local history, culture
Portchester Castle		Portchester	Fareham	History	Operated by English Heritage, remains of a medieval castle and former Roman fort, exhibits about history of the castle, Portchester village, and recovered artefacts
Portsmouth City Museum		Portsmouth	Portsmouth	Multiple	Local history, culture, period rooms displays, life of author Arthur Conan Doyle and the creation of Sherlock Holmes, fine and decorative arts, art gallery
Portsmouth Historic Dockyard		Portsmouth	Portsmouth	Maritime	Includes the National Museum of the Royal Navy Portsmouth, HMS Victory, HMS Warrior (1860), Mary Rose Museum, Dockyard Apprentice Exhibition, Trafalgar Experience, Trafalgar Sail
Rockbourne Roman Villa and Museum		Rockbourne	New Forest	Archaeology	Excavated Roman villa and museum with recovered artefacts
Royal Green Jackets (Rifles) Museum		Winchester	City of Winchester	Military	History and artefacts of the Royal Green Jackets regiment, part of Winchester's Military Museums
Royal Hampshire Regiment Museum		Winchester	City of Winchester	Military	History and memorabilia of the Royal Hampshire Regiment, part of Winchester's Military Museums
Royal Marines Museum		Portsmouth	Portsmouth	Military	History of the Royal Marines
Royal Military Police Museum		Southwick	City of Winchester	Law enforcement	history of the Royal Military Police, open by appointment only
Royal Navy Submarine Museum		Gosport	Gosport	Military	International history of submarine development
Sammy Miller Motorcycle Museum		New Milton	New Forest	Transportation	Restored motorcycles
Sandham Memorial Chapel		Burghclere	Basingstoke and Deane	Art	Operated by the National Trust, features large-scale paintings by acclaimed artist Stanley Spencer that reflect his experiences in World War I
SeaCity Museum		Southampton	Southampton	Multiple	Local history, archaeology, permanent Titanic exhibition
Solent Sky		Southampton	Southampton	Transportation	History of aviation in Southampton, the Solent area and Hampshire, special focus on the Supermarine aircraft company
Southampton City Art Gallery		Southampton	Southampton	Art	Collection covers six centuries of European art history
Southsea Castle		Portsmouth	Portsmouth	Military	One of Henry VIII's Device Forts
Southwick House		Southwick	City of Winchester	Military	Important site for planning of the D-Day operations, open by appointment only
The Spring Arts & Heritage Centre		Havant	Havant	Multiple	arts centre, local history and culture exhibits
St. Barbe Museum & Art Gallery		Lymington	New Forest	Multiple	local and coastal maritime history, including smugglers, salt makers and boat builders, art gallery
Stansted House		Rowland's Castle	East Hampshire	Historic house	Located on the Hampshire/West Sussex border, early 20th-century Edwardian country house and chapel
Stratfield Saye House		Stratfield Saye	Basingstoke and Deane	Multiple	Historic estate house with paintings and furniture collections, home of the Dukes of Wellington since 1817, exhibit of military artefacts and history of Arthur Wellesley, 1st Duke of Wellington
Totton and Eling Heritage Centre		Eling	New Forest	Local	local history, culture
Tudor House and Garden		Southampton	Southampton	Historic house	Tudor-style house dating back to the 12th century
The Vyne		Sherborne St John	Basingstoke and Deane	Historic house	Operated by the National Trust, 16th-century country house with an eclectic mix of fine furniture, portraits, textiles and sculpture from over three centuries, gardens
Twyford Waterworks		Twyford	City of Winchester	Industry	Former pumping station and waterworks, with working steam engines, narrow-gauge railway and other associated equipment
Westbury Manor Museum		Fareham	Fareham	Local	Local history, culture
Westgate Museum		Winchester	City of Winchester	Military	Fortified medieval gateway to the city, later used as a prison and debtor's gaol, features collection of pre-Imperial weights and measures
Whitchurch Silk Mill		Whitchurch	Basingstoke and Deane	Industry	Former textile mill with waterwheel
Willis Museum		Basingstoke	Basingstoke and Deane	Local	Local history, art gallery
Winchester Castle		Winchester	City of Winchester	Historic house	Features the Great Hall, a 13th-century hall and medieval round table
Winchester Cathedral		Winchester	City of Winchester	Religious	Includes historic bibles, art and artefacts
Winchester City Mill		Winchester	City of Winchester	Mill	Operated by the National Trust, restored water mill
Winchester City Museum		Winchester	City of Winchester	Local	local history, archaeology, reconstructed Victorian and Edwardian shops
Winchester Discovery Centre		Winchester	City of Winchester	Multiple	city's library with galleries for local history, culture, art
Winchester Science Centre		Winchester	City of Winchester	Science	Hands-on interactive science and technology centre, planetarium
Winchester's Military Museums		Winchester	City of Winchester	Military	Complex including five independent regimental museums of the King's Royal Hussars, Royal Hampshire Regiment, Royal Green Jackets (Rifles) Museum, The Gurkha Museum and Adjutant General's Corps

== Defunct museums ==
- Eastleigh Museum, Eastleigh closed in 2022.
- The Bear Museum, Petersfield, closed in 2006
- God's House Tower Museum Of Archaeology, Southampton, closed in 2011
- Ringwood Town & Country Experience, Ringwood, closed indefinitely
- The Wool House, closed in 2012

== See also ==
- Category:Tourist attractions in Hampshire
