= Petersfield Museum =

Local museum in Petersfield, Hampshire, England

Coordinates: 51.0030°N 0.9362°W

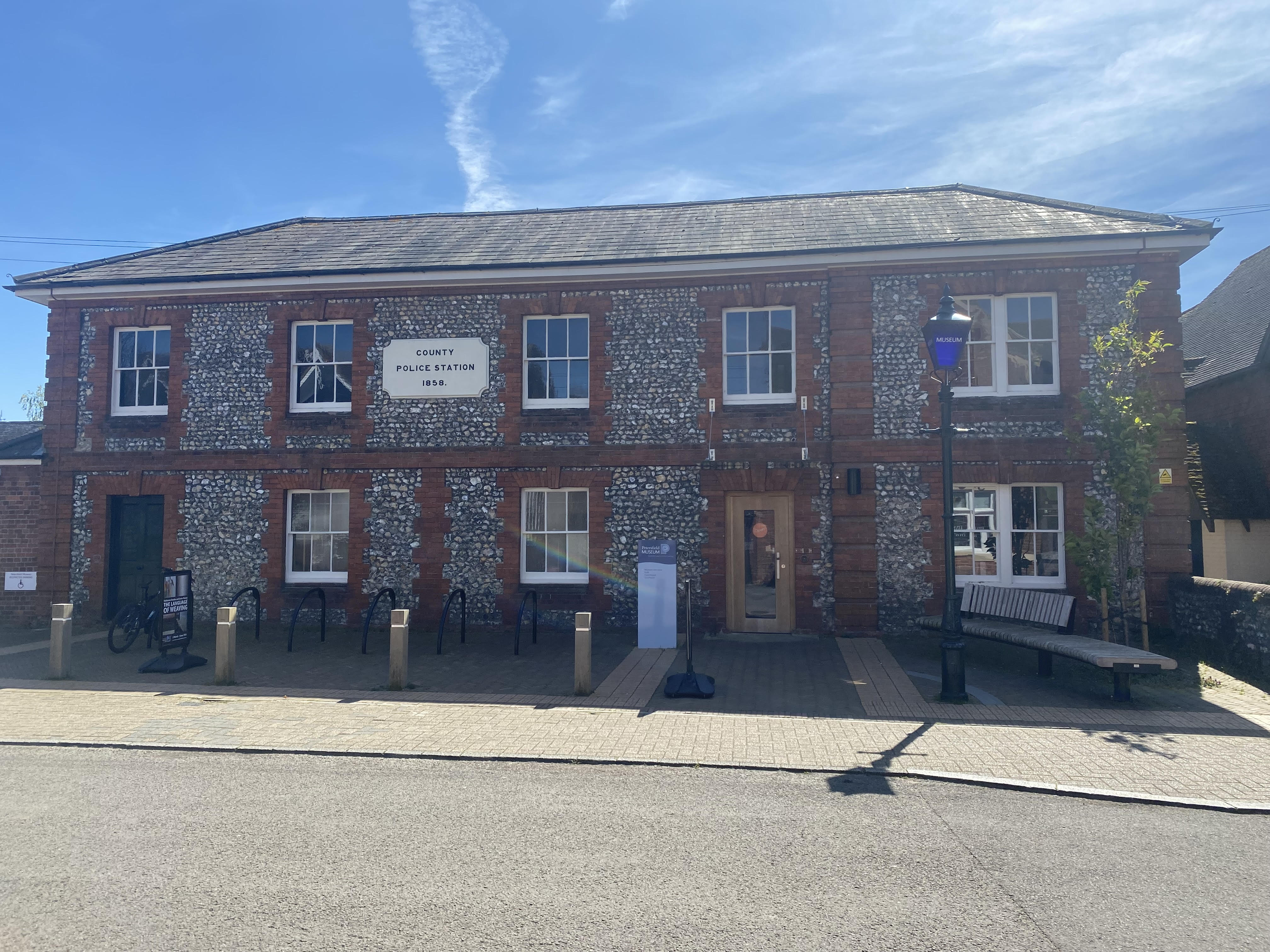
Petersfield Museum and Art Gallery.

Petersfield Museum and Art Gallery is a museum and arts institution in the ancient market town of Petersfield in Hampshire, England. Established in 1999, Petersfield Museum and Art Gallery is an accredited independent museum and is a registered charity that has evolved into a centre for the arts, history and hosts community events.

== Location ==
The Museum and Art Gallery is located in the Old Police Station on St Peter's Road, Petersfield. Originally, this was the site of the Petersfield House, manor to the Jolliffe family until 1793, with the police station being built later in 1858. The police station was designed by the Hampshire Constabulary's architect, Thomas Stopher and his son. The building would have originally had accommodation for a superintendent and two constables, three cells for prisoners, stables and cart house.

Petersfield Museum and Art Gallery also contains Petersfield's magistrate's courthouse, built in 1893, located behind the police station. The 'Petty Sessional Court House' was the original site of Petersfield Museum founded by the 'Petersfield Area Historical Society' in the 1990s.

== History ==
Petersfield Museum opened in 1999 housed in the magistrate's courthouse and led by a group of local historians, 'The Petersfield Area Historical Society'. Since then, the site has expanded to the Old Police Station. Between 2017 and 2021, the Petersfield Museum and Art Gallery underwent a nearly £4 million redevelopment supported by the National Lottery Heritage Fund.

Today, the site includes the original magistrate's courthouse and police station housing the Museum and Art Gallery, Shop, and the Edward Thomas Centre.

== Collections ==
The Museum and Art Gallery contains art, archaeology, historical and reference collections, photographs, archives, oral history and maps relating to Petersfield and surrounding area.

=== Archaeology ===
The majority of the Archaeology Collection comes from the 'People of the Heath' project hosted by Petersfield Museum and Art Gallery between 2014 and 2018. 'People of the Heath' set out to research the Early Bronze Age barrows located in the Petersfield Heath, excavating 14 of the 21 monuments.

=== Fashion and Textiles with the Bedales Historic Dress Collection ===
The Fashion and Textiles Collection contains hand-made garments, ready-to-wear clothing and designer items ranging from the 18th century to modern day. The Collection houses the Bedales Historic Dress Collection which contains historic clothing from the drama department of Bedales School, located in Steep, which were used in theatrical productions since the 1940s. In 2007, Bedales donated over 1000 pieces including ladies, gents and children's clothing and accessories dating from 1720.

=== Flora Twort Art Collection ===
Flora Twort (1893-1985) was an English artist who specialised in watercolours and pastels of the scenes and people. Twort pursued the arts at London Polytechnic and Slade School of Art. Flora Twort later moved to Petersfield and established a studio on the first floor of No. 1 and No. 2 The Square where she also assisted in running The Petersfield Workshop and Bookshop with Hester Wagstaff and Maria Brahms.

Flora Twort's paintings and drawings captured the scenes from her everyday life in Hampshire and activities including Petersfield Market day and the Taro Fair of the 1920s and 1930s. She was a member of the Society of Women Artists and her paintings were exhibited at the Royal Academy of Arts and the New English Art Club.

Following Flora Twort's death in 1985, she left her cottage, studio and examples of her work to Hampshire County Council. It was run as a museum and restaurant by HCC until 2008. In 2009, the Flora Twort Gallery and its collections were transferred to the Petersfield Museum Trust. This collection consists of paintings, sketches and archives relating to her life.

=== Photography Collection and The Don Eades Photographic Archive ===
The Photography Collection has over 10,000 photographs and postcards from the late 1800s to the present day. In 2016, Don Eades - a photographer from Buriton - gave his life's work to Petersfield Museum and Art Gallery. The collection pulls daily life from the 1960s, 1970s and 1980s into focus, from Petersfield's first supermarket to village sports, cycling proficiency and a futuristic factory.

=== Social History Collection ===
The social history collection illustrates the social, economic and cultural history of Petersfield and the surrounding villages. The object collection includes locally made products such as Minibrix from the local Itshide rubber factory, signs from local pubs and shops as well as tools and objects used in the home. Among the highlights are a penny-farthing made on the Isle of Wight and the Coat of Arms from the former magistrates court.

=== Edward Thomas Centre ===
Edward Thomas (1878-1917) was a British poet, writer, essayist and literary critic who lived locally in the village of Steep. It was from here he first started writing his poetry in December 1914 at the age of 36, after an already prolific literary career, and over the next two-and a-half years wrote all his 144 poems. Inspired by the landscapes around him, much of his poetry reflected his love of nature and the impact the War was having on life in England. Thomas' literary social circles included English poet and writer Gordon Bottomley and the American poet Robert Frost. Frost's famous poem, 'The Road Not Taken', was inspired by walks with Thomas during his time in England. Edward Thomas's most well known poem is his poem, Adlestrop. Although being over-age, he enlisted into the Artists Rifles in July 1915, transferred to the Royal Garrison Artillery in October 1916 and was killed on active service at the first Battle of Arras on 9 April 1917.

Petersfield Museum and Art Gallery, together with the Edward Thomas Fellowship, has created the only Edward Thomas Centre in England, which is under-pinned by what is possibly the most important private collection of books by and about Edward Thomas in the country. This collection was the property of the late Tim Wilton-Steer and donated to the Edward Thomas Fellowship by his family.
