= Hester Wagstaff =

English artist, author and jeweller

Hester Marion Wagstaff
- Born: 15 June 1892; Saffron Walden, England
- Died: 27 January 1953 (aged 60); Petersfield, England
- Other name: Waggles
- Education: St Marylebone Polytechnic Institute School of Art
- Occupations: Author, illustrator
- Family: J Archibald Allen (uncle)

Hester Marion Wagstaff (Note: Her surname was sometimes misspelt as Wagstaffe) (15 June 1892 – 27 January 1953) was an English writer, illustrator, artist, jeweller and mapmaker. In 1913, a card-table top that she made while studying at the St Marylebone Polytechnic Institute School of Art was presented to Queen Elizabeth on behalf of the school. She wrote and illustrated several children's books between the 1930s and 1950s, including Doings of Dicky Daw (1940) and three books about a Jolly Robin. She was an accomplished jeweller and co-founded the Petersfield Workshops and Bookshop.

== Personal life and education ==
Hester Marion Wagstaff was born to Jane Pearson and Ernest Hamilton Wagstaff in Leighton Buzzard, England. She had an older sister.

In 1910 Wagstaff won first prize in memory drawing in a Midland Counties Union examination. She attended Leighton Buzzard Evening School and the St Marylebone Polytechnic Institute School of Art, where she became friends with Flora Twort and Cecily Peele.

Wagstaff lived in Petersfield from 1918 until her death. She lived at Oakshott Hanger, a hamlet just outside Petersfield, with Twort, Winifred Stamp and Maria Brahms. She was on the committee of the Group for the Preservation and Improvement of Petersfield from 1945, and was a founding member of the Petersfield Arts and Crafts Society. When Stamp died in 1948, she left her effects to Wagstaff.

== Career ==
In 1912 and 1913 Wagstaff exhibited at the Arts and Crafts Exhibition Society in London. In 1913, as part of a national competition, she was awarded a gold medal for a stained wood-carved tabletop. It was exhibited at the Victoria and Albert Museum and together with a "decorated box to hold theatrical make-up" was seen by Queen Elizabeth who was "much charmed" and expressed an interest in buying them. The school's governors purchased the pieces and presented them to the Queen. The UK's Board of Trade also sent pieces of her work to the 1913 Ghent International Exposition. In 1914 she exhibited an oblong mirror frame as part of The National Competition of Art in London.

Wagstaff was a member of the Society of Women Artists and the Three Arts Club. In the 1940s she exhibited paintings at the Petersfield Arts and Crafts exhibition. Together with Twort, Brahms and Harry Roberts, Wagstaff ran the Petersfield Workshops and Bookshop in Petersfield town centre, where she also sold her jewellery.

After her death, the Petersfield Arts and Crafts Society established the Hester Wagstaff Memorial Prize. It is still awarded annually.

=== Books ===
Wagstaff wrote and/or illustrated the following books:

- A Rook Among the Magpies: And other reminiscences (1933) by J Archibald Allen. Pub. Simpkin Marshall - illustrator
- The Doings of Dicky Daw' (1939) Pub. Hamish Hamilton - author
- The Tale of the Jolly Robin (1945) Pub. Faber and Faber - author and illustrator
- The Tale of the Jolly Robin Family (1945) Pub. Faber and Faber - author and illustrator
- The Adventures of Velvet (1946) Pub. Faber and Faber - author and illustrator
- Fuzzy Wuzzy & Woolly Wonder (1947) Pub. Hamish Hamilton - author
- The Tale of Two Jolly Robins (1947) Pub. Faber and Faber - author and illustrator
- The Adventures of Velvet and Vicky (1950) Pub. Faber and Faber - author and illustrator

=== Maps ===
- Petersfield in 1922 (1922) Pub. Petersfield Bookshop - illustrator
- Eton College (1937) which was subsequently featured in Eton Medley, published in 1948
