= Adlestrop =

Village in Gloucestershire, England

Coordinates: 51.944333°N 1.65°W

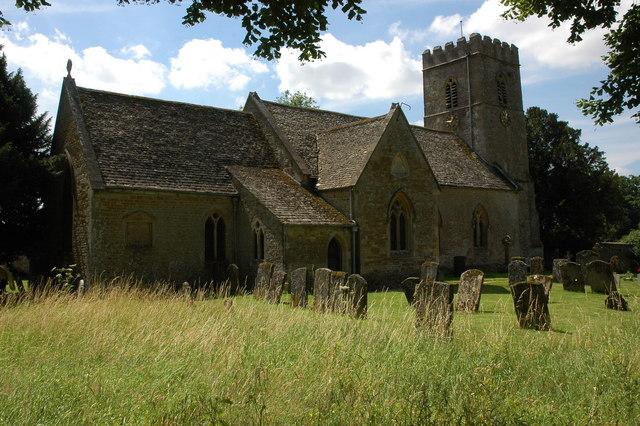
- St Mary Magdalene parish church

- Location within Gloucestershire
- Population: 120 (2011 Census)
- Civil parish: Adlestrop
- District: Cotswold
- Shire county: Gloucestershire
- Region: South West
- Country: England
- Sovereign state: United Kingdom
- Post town: Moreton-in-Marsh
- Postcode district: GL56
- Dialling code: 01608
- Police: Gloucestershire
- Fire: Gloucestershire
- Ambulance: South Western
- UK Parliament: North Cotswolds
- Website: Adlestrop

Adlestrop (/ˈædəlstrɒp/) is a village and civil parish in the Cotswolds, 3 miles (5 km) east of Stow-on-the-Wold, Gloucestershire, England, on the county boundary with Oxfordshire. The River Evenlode forms the southwest boundary of the parish. The village is on a stream that flows southwest to join the river.

The A436 road, which links the A44 road in Oxfordshire with Stow-on-the-Wold, passes through the parish just south of the village. The Cotswold Line railway passes along the Evenlode valley southwest of the village and until 1966 had a station here. The village is best known for the 1917 poem "Adlestrop" by Edward Thomas, which tells of an unexpected stop at the station.

Since 1935 the parish of Adlestrop has included the village of Daylesford. The 2011 Census recorded the parish population as 120.

== Archaeology ==
About 1 mile (1.6 km) northeast of the village is a tumulus about 26 metres (85 ft) long and 16 metres (52 ft) wide. The tumulus is low, only 2 feet 6 inches (0.8 m) high at one end and 5 feet (1.5 m) at the other. It is near the Iron Age hill fort in the adjoining Oxfordshire parish of Chastleton.

Romano-British pottery and a coin of the usurper-emperor Allectus (died 296) have been found at the tumulus. The tumulus is a Scheduled Monument.

== Place-name ==
The Domesday Book of 1086 records the place-name as Tedestrop. A Charter Roll of 1251 records it as Tatletrop and the Codex Diplomaticus Aevi Saxonici records it as Tatlestrop. The name is derived from the Old English þrop for a village, combined with the name of a person called Tātel or Tǣtel.

== Manor ==
King Coenred of Mercia is said to have granted the manor of Adlestrop to Evesham Abbey in AD 708. In the 10th century the manor was assessed at seven hides. The Abbey continued to hold the manor until 1540 when it surrendered all its estates to the Crown in the Dissolution of the Monasteries.

In 1553 the Crown sold Adlestrop manor to Sir Thomas Leigh, who in 1558 was elected Lord Mayor of London. The manor descended in the Leigh family to Chandos Leigh (1791–1850), who in 1839 was created Baron Leigh. Adlestrop remained in the Leigh family in 1960.

== Adlestrop Park ==
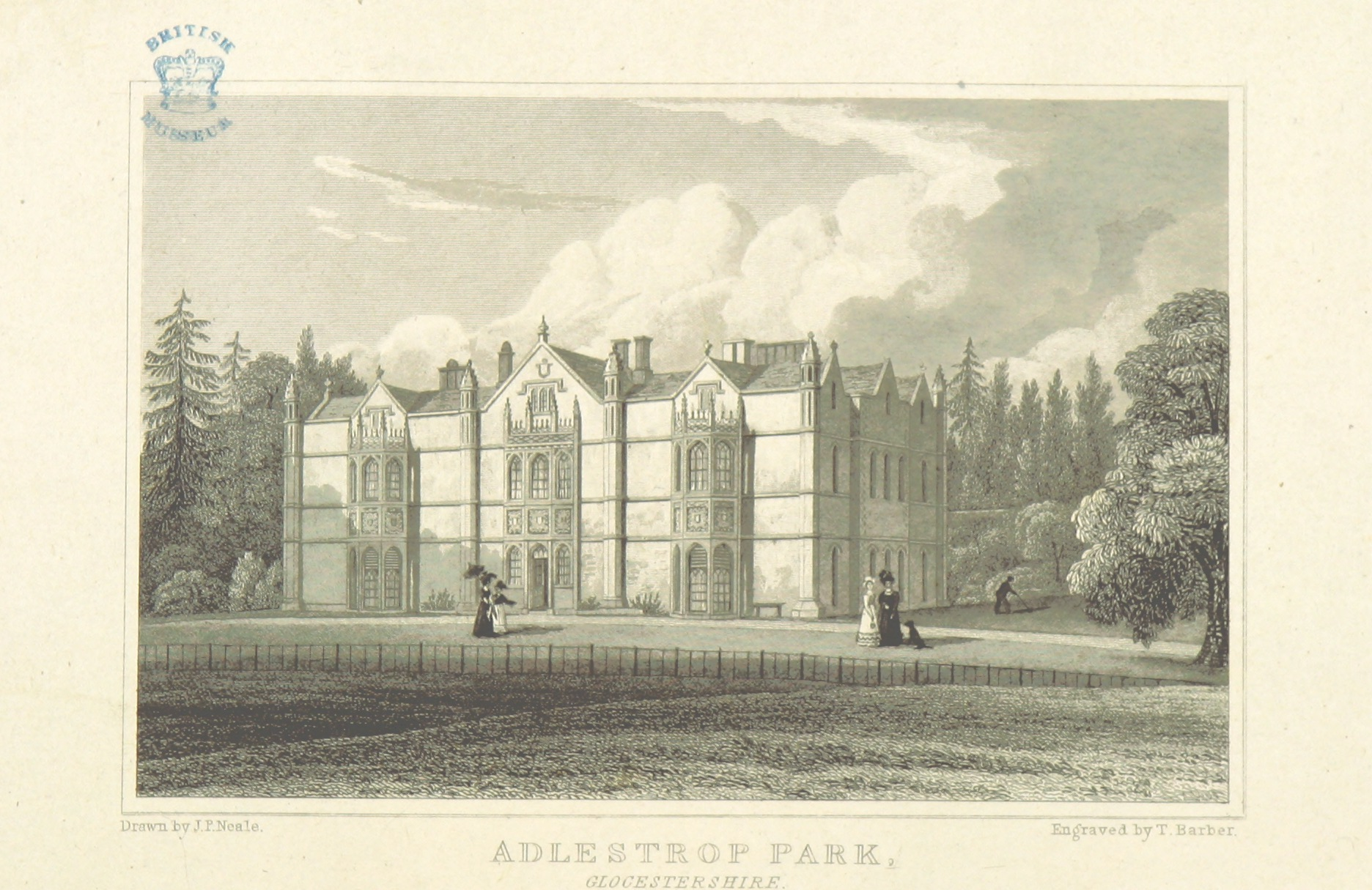
Adlestrop Park in 1818

In 1632 Sir William Leigh, grandson of Sir Thomas, died and left the manor to his son, also called William. The younger William chose to live at Adlestrop, and had a barn near the parish church converted into a manor house.

In 1759–62 much of the house was demolished and rebuilt on a larger scale to designs by the Gothic Revival architect Sanderson Miller. Later Humphry Repton (1752–1818) remodelled the gardens. The house and garden are Grade II* listed.

== Parish church ==
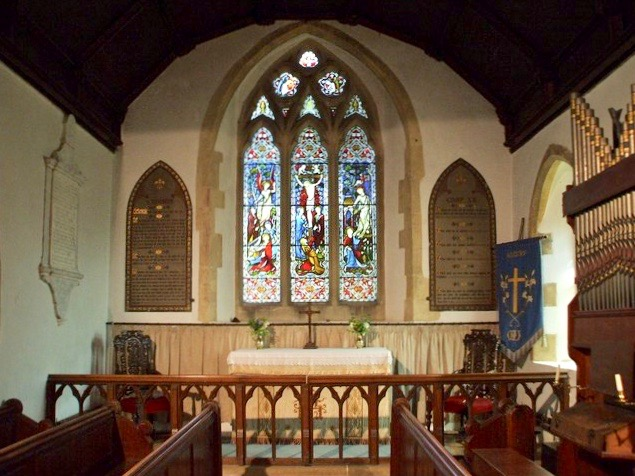
Inside the parish church of St Mary Magdalene, looking east

The Church of England parish church of St Mary Magdalene is cruciform, with a chancel, nave, west tower and north and south transepts. The tower arch may be early 13th-century. The chancel arch is 13th-century but has been rebuilt. The tower is 14th-century. The church was rebuilt in about 1750, but the work was re-done in 1765, possibly by Sanderson Miller. The south transept is 18th-century Gothic Revival. The building was restored again in the early 1860s. The advowson is held by Balliol College, Oxford.

=== Bells ===
The west tower has a ring of six bells hung for change ringing.

Until 2012 they were a ring of five. Abraham I Rudhall of Gloucester cast four of them including the treble in 1711. Thomas II Mears of the Whitechapel Bell Foundry cast the tenor bell in 1838. By about 1975 dry rot and woodworm had made the frame unsafe and the tenor bell was cracked, so the bells were listed as unringable. In 2015 the Whitechapel Bell Foundry re-cast the tenor and treble bells to make three new ones, increasing the ring from five to six. The frame was rebuilt, the bells re-hung and the ring of six was first rung in May 2016.

Before the restoration the bells were:

- Treble (smallest bell), note F: cast in 1711 by Abraham Rudhall
- 2nd bell, note E: cast in 1711 by Abraham Rudhall
- 3rd bell, note D: cast in 1711 by Abraham Rudhall
- 4th bell, note C: cast in 1711 by Abraham Rudhall
- Tenor (largest bell), note B flat (but cracked and toneless): cast in 1838 by Thomas Mears (Gloucester).

== Adlestrop House ==
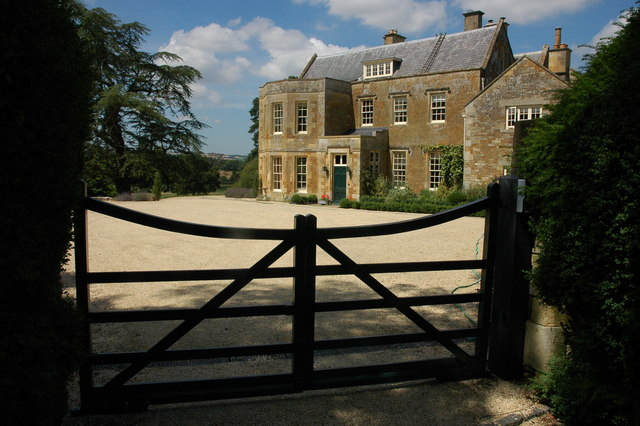
Adlestrop House, formerly the rectory

Adlestrop House was built in the 17th century as the Rectory. It was altered in the 18th century and extended in the 19th and 20th centuries.

Thomas Leigh, a member of the manorial family, was Rector of Adlestrop from 1762 until his death in 1813. One of his cousins was the mother of novelist Jane Austen, who visited the rectory three times between 1794 and 1806. Her novel Mansfield Park may have been inspired by the village.

== Amenities ==
Adlestrop has a post office and village shop that sells groceries and in the summer months serves teas. There is a village hall. Adlestrop Cricket Club plays at Adlestrop Park.

== Railway and former station ==
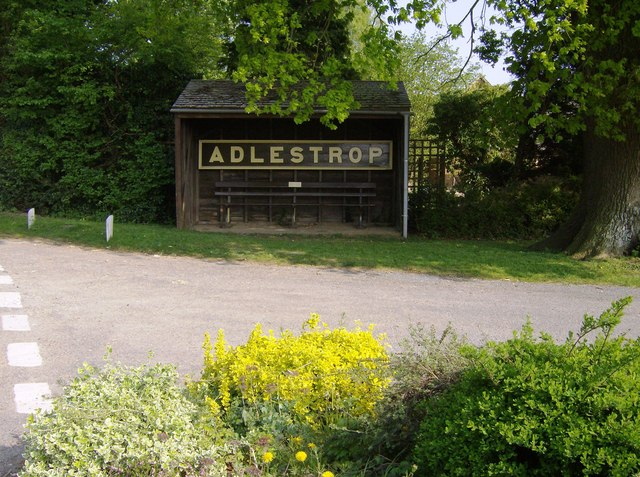
Adlestrop bus shelter with the station sign

In 1853 the Oxford, Worcester and Wolverhampton Railway was built along the Evenlode valley. A station was opened about 1/2 mile (800 m) southwest of Adlestrop village where the main road (now the A436) crosses the river. The station was called "Addlestrop" and Stow Road (note the double "D") until 1862, when it was shortened to "Addlestrop". The Great Western Railway took over the line in 1863 and changed the spelling to "Adlestrop" with a single "D" in 1883.

British Railways closed the station in 1966 but the railway remains open. The nearest station is now at Kingham, about 3 miles (5 km) south of Adlestrop.

Adlestrop was immortalised by Edward Thomas's poem "Adlestrop", which was published in 1917. The poem describes an uneventful journey that Thomas took on 24 June 1914 on the Oxford to Worcester express. The train made a scheduled stop at Adlestrop railway station, which the poet thought was unscheduled. He did not alight from the train, but describes a moment of calm pause in which "a blackbird sang close by, and... all the birds of Oxfordshire and Gloucestershire".

One of the station signs and one of the benches that used to be on the station platform are now in the village bus shelter. A plaque on the bench quotes Thomas's poem. These are all that remain of the former station.

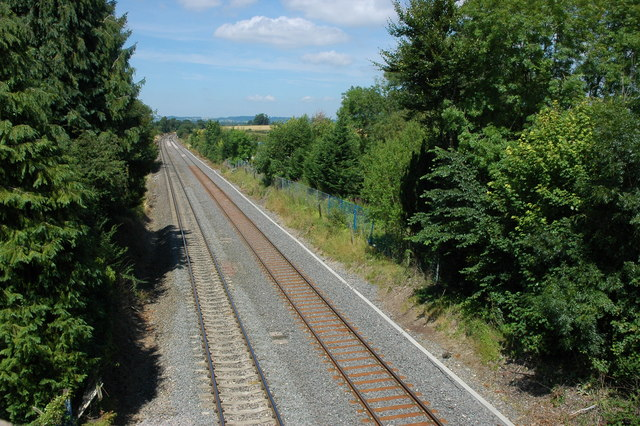
Site of Adlestrop railway station

Adlestrop

Yes. I remember Adlestrop—
The name, because one afternoon
Of heat, the express-train drew up there
Unwontedly. It was late June.

The steam hissed. Someone cleared his throat.
No one left and no one came
On the bare platform. What I saw
Was Adlestrop—only the name

And willows, willow-herb, and grass,
And meadowsweet, and haycocks dry,
No whit less still and lonely fair
Than the high cloudlets in the sky.

And for that minute a blackbird sang
Close by, and round him, mistier,
Farther and farther, all the birds
Of Oxfordshire and Gloucestershire.

The Millom poet Norman Nicholson wrote a poem, 'Do You Remember Adlestrop?' (1981, in the collection 'Sea to the West'). It includes the line 'And Willows, willow-herb and grass'.

== Notable people ==
- Cecil Fiennes (1831–1870), cricketer
- Wingfield Fiennes (1834–1923), cricketer

== Bibliography ==
- Ekwall, Eilert (1960) [1936]. Concise Oxford Dictionary of English Place-Names (4th ed.). Oxford: Oxford University Press. Adlestrop. ISBN 0198691033.
- Elrington, CR, ed. (1965). A History of the County of Gloucester. Victoria County History. Vol. VI. London: Oxford University Press for the Institute of Historical Research. pp. 8–16.
- Harvey, Anne, ed. (1999). Adlestrop Revisited: an Anthology Inspired by Edward Thomas's Poem. Stroud: Sutton Publishing. ISBN 0-7509-2289-3.
- Huxley, Victoria (2013). Jane Austen & Adlestrop: Her Other Family. Adlestrop: Windrush Publishing. ISBN 978-0-9575150-2-4.
- RCHME, ed. (1976). "Adlestrop". Ancient and Historical Monuments in the County of Gloucester Iron Age and Romano-British Monuments in the Gloucestershire Cotswolds. London: Royal Commission on the Historical Monuments of England. p. 1.
- Verey, David (1970). Gloucestershire: The Cotswolds. The Buildings of England. Vol. 1. Harmondsworth: Penguin Books. pp. 79–81. ISBN 0-14-071040-X.
