= Twort =

Twort is an English surname. Notable people with the surname include:

- Flora Twort (1893–1985), English artist and bookshop proprietor
- Frederick Twort (1877–1950), English bacteriologist
