= St Barbe Museum & Art Gallery =

Coordinates: 50.7591°N 1.5428°W

St Barbe Museum + Art Gallery
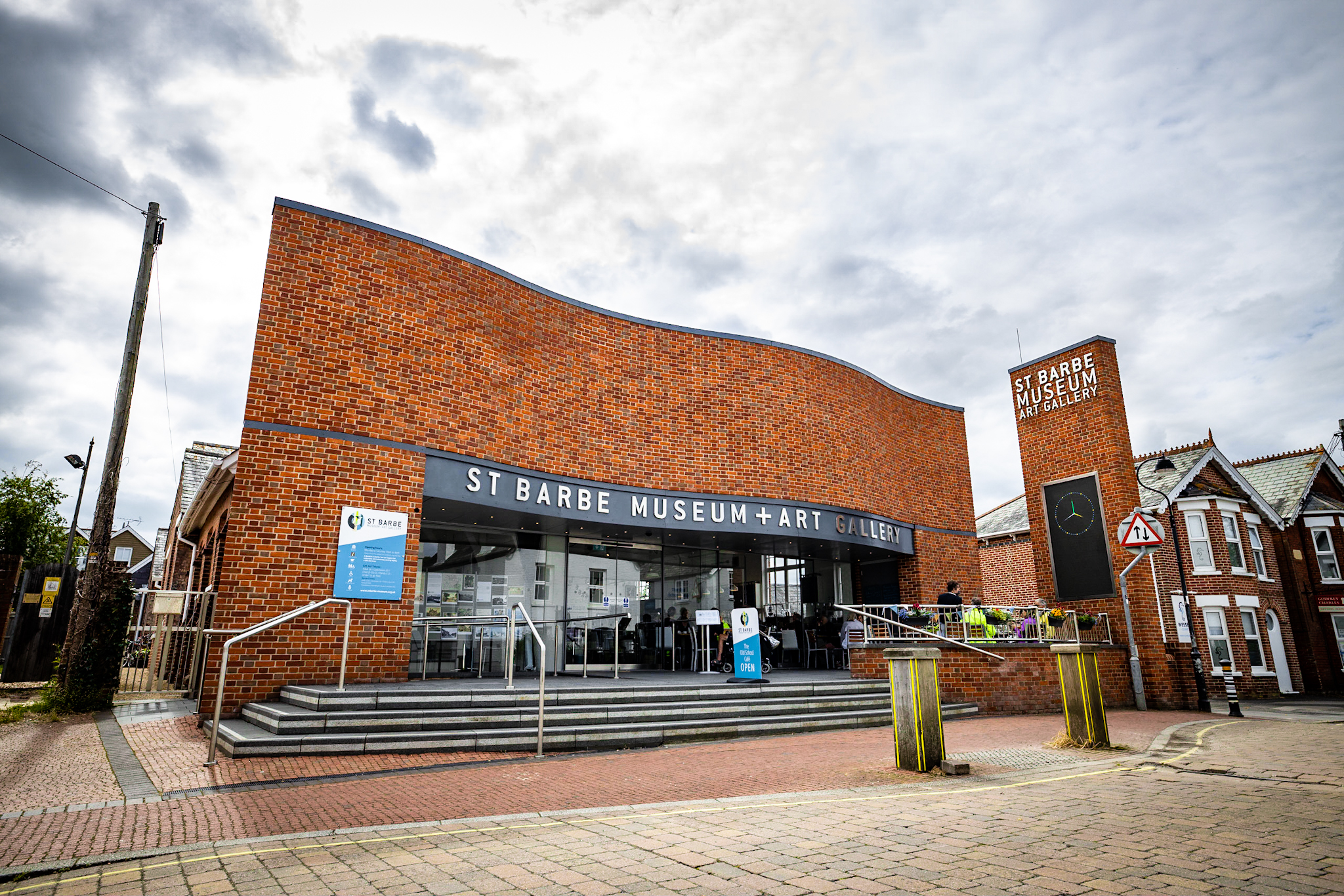
- Established: 1999
- Location: Lymington, Hampshire, UK
- Type: Historical Museum
- Website: https://www.stbarbe-museum.org.uk

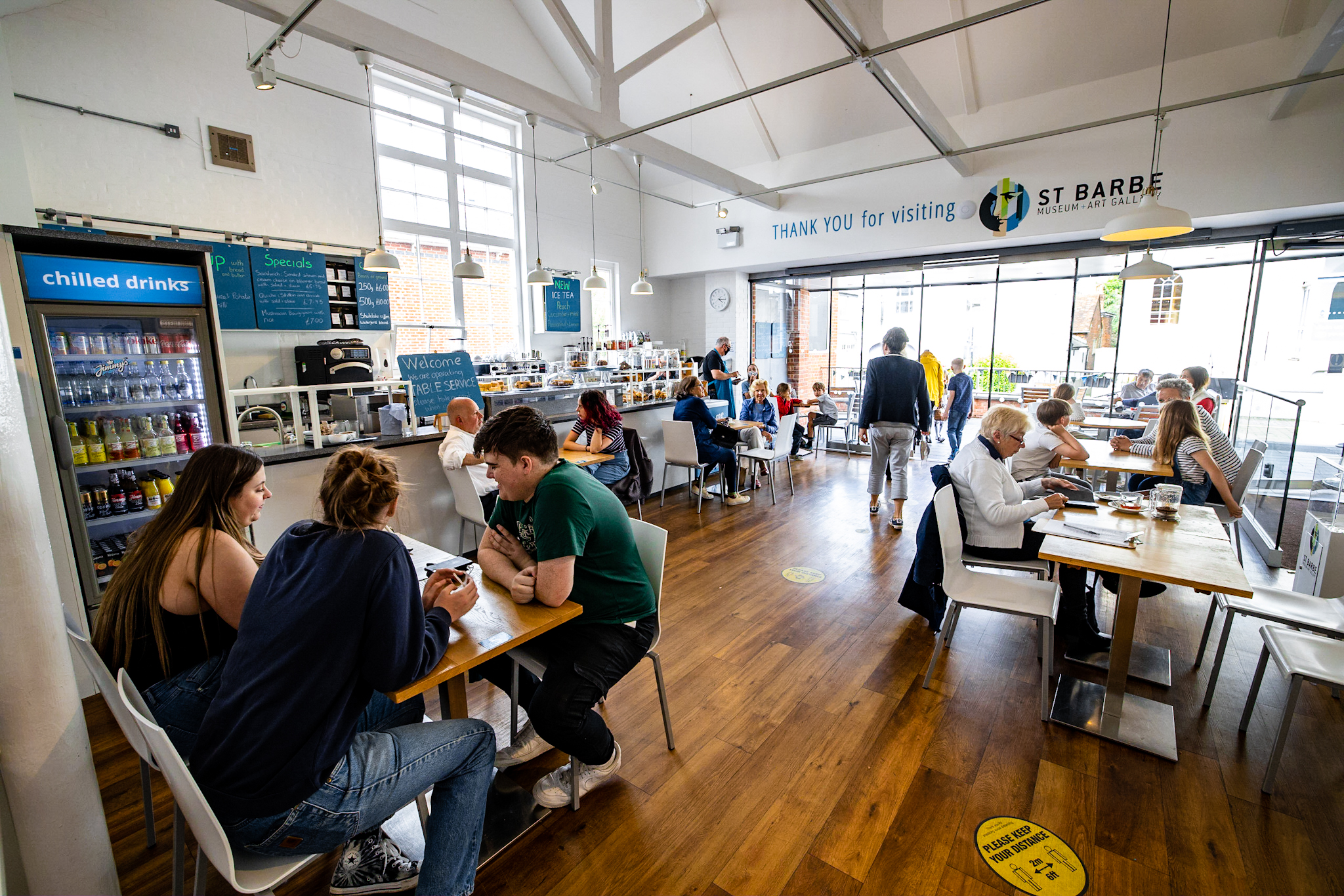
The Old School Cafe

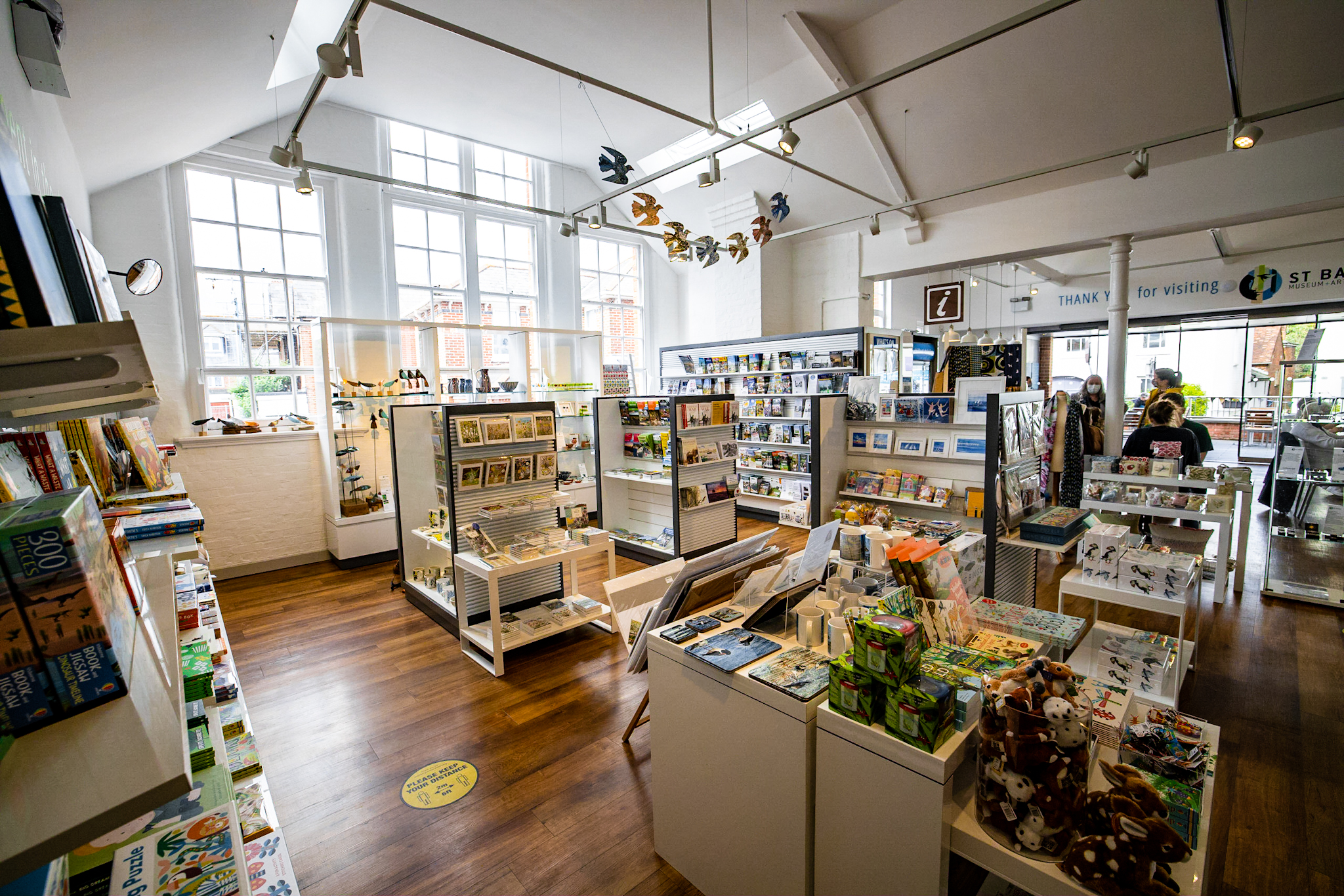
The Gift Shop

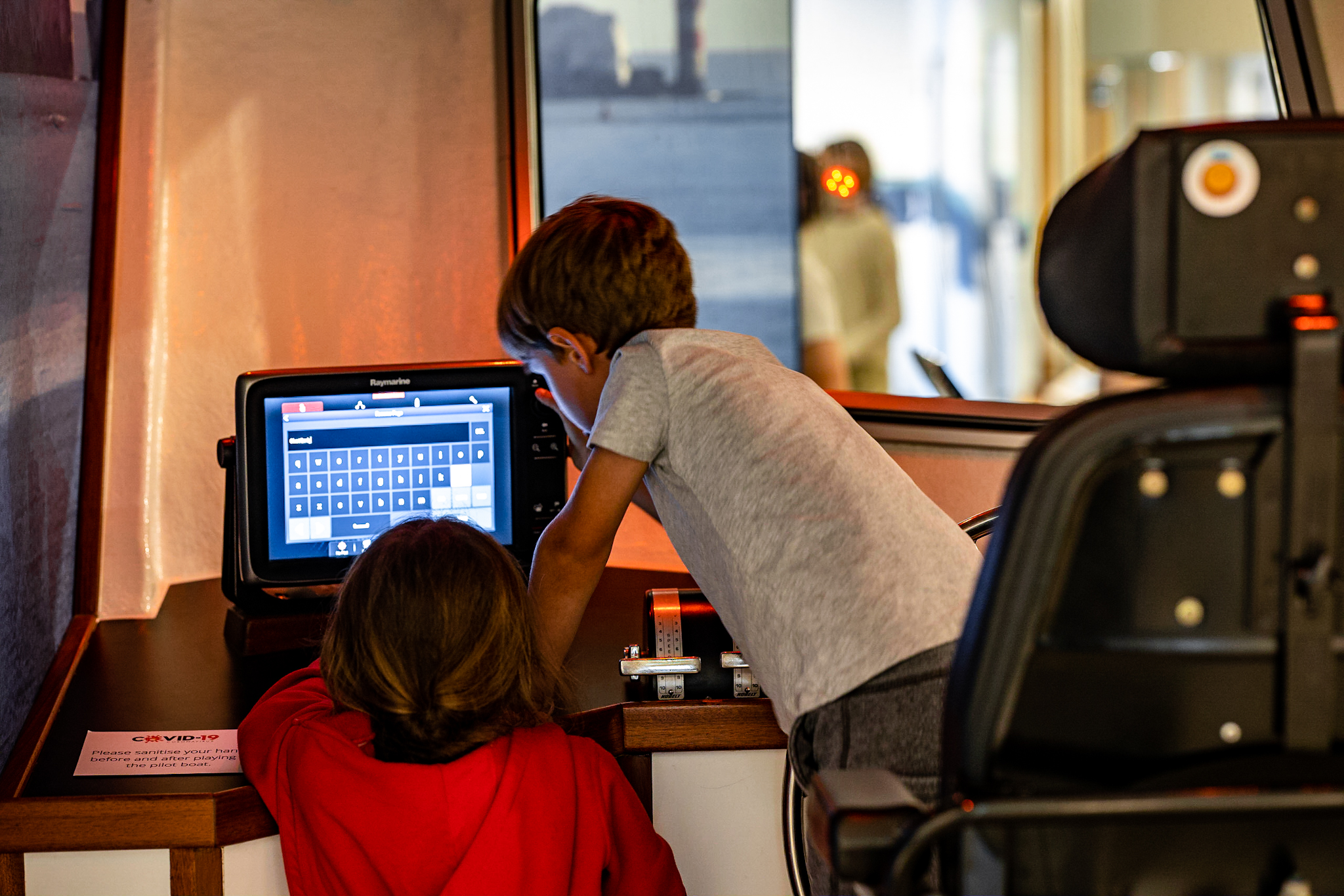
Interactive Exhibit in the Museum

St Barbe Museum + Art Gallery is a local museum and art gallery in Lymington, Hampshire, England.

Enclosed in the building is a small cafe called 'The Old School Cafe', a gift shop, multi-use room named 'The Mac Carthy Room', a museum showcasing artefacts and historical information about the Lymington and the New Forest, and a medium-sized gallery, used for art and historical exhibitions.

St Barbe is situated within the New Forest, Lymington. The New Forest has a very varied coastal and forest landscape with approximately 22 villages, all with its own unique character and culture. The area is classified as significantly rural, with pockets of deprivation and social isolation due to lack of transport and inadequate access to services.

In the summer of 2017 the museum and gallery reopened its doors after a multi-million pound refurbishment, securing the future of the building for future generations. The size of the gallery was increased to hold much larger exhibitions and hold pieces from galleries such as the Tate. A new cafe opened at the front of the foyer, serving hot and cold drinks, cakes, sandwiches and meals. The gift shop is located just behind this, with items sourced from the local area, and parking clocks that can be used around the local area. For a small fee that goes towards maintaining St Barbe, you can access the gallery and museum, with previous exhibitions such as 'Erie', 'Dinosaurs on your Doorstep' and 'Contemporary Cuts'.

St Barbe Museum + Art Gallery is an independent charity. The Museum has been fully accredited since 2013 and has been developing unique exhibitions of historic and contemporary art since 1998. The programme has included works on loan from national, regional and private collections. The museum regularly create opportunities for visitors to see significant artworks from Tate, the British Museum and the V&A. Many exhibitions have had a national profile including Shorelines: Artists on the South Coast (2015) and Dazzle: Disruption and Disguise in War and Art (2018). The latter, part-funded by ACE, achieved primetime TV coverage and editorial.

They are increasingly using their exhibitions to engage with specific audiences and deliver a programme for adults and older people which include: ‘Workshops and talks’, ‘Tea and Memories’ a chance for older residents to look at historic images, photographs and objects to share their memories and ‘Knit and Natter’ a social knitting group which often creates work associated with the exhibitions. Family and Young People activities are delivered throughout the year (weekends and school holidays) which tie in with exhibition themes.

They work in partnership with heritage, arts and local community providers such as Hampshire Cultural Trust, FOLIO, Artswork, SPUD, New Forest National Park Authority, Lymington Community Association, Hampshire Art for Recreation and Therapy and the New Forest Heritage Centre, allowing them to draw on expertise, resources and networks.

== History ==
Since it opened fully in 1999 the museum has developed a reputation for the quality of its displays and its excellent exhibition programme. This achievement has been recognised by full registered status, loans from national museums, including the Tate Gallery and the V&A, inclusion in the National Maritime Museum pilot touring exhibition scheme and, most recently, by the award of a major Heritage Lottery Fund grant (10% match funding provided by NFDC) to develop the museum's lifelong learning services.

The St. Barbe Museum + Art Gallery project first began to take shape in 1988 with the formation of the Friends of Lymington Museum who began to campaign for a museum for the town. The following year the Friends began collecting objects which now form part of a varied collection numbering several thousand objects. In 1992 the Lymington Museum Trust was set up and began the serious business of developing a museum for Lymington and district. The major breakthrough came when New Forest District Council provided an old school building in New Street and Hampshire County Council Museum Service assisted with the employment of a full-time curator. The Museum in a Room, the museum shop and a Visitor Information Centre opened in 1995.

With the aid of a Heritage Lottery Fund grant, work began on creating the present museum displays and art galleries. The latter opened in 1997 and a continuous exhibition programme has been running since April 1998. The museum displays opened in March 1999 and received 2,000 visitors on the first day.

The museum is now concentrating on developing its educational resources and services and the employment of an Education & Access Officer will be a vital part of a project to encourage schools, adult and informal learners to use the museum. The museum is also playing an increasingly important role in the wider New Forest museum and arts community.

== See also ==
- List of museums in Hampshire
