= Adlestrop railway station =

Disused railway station in Adlestrop, Cotswold

Adlestrop
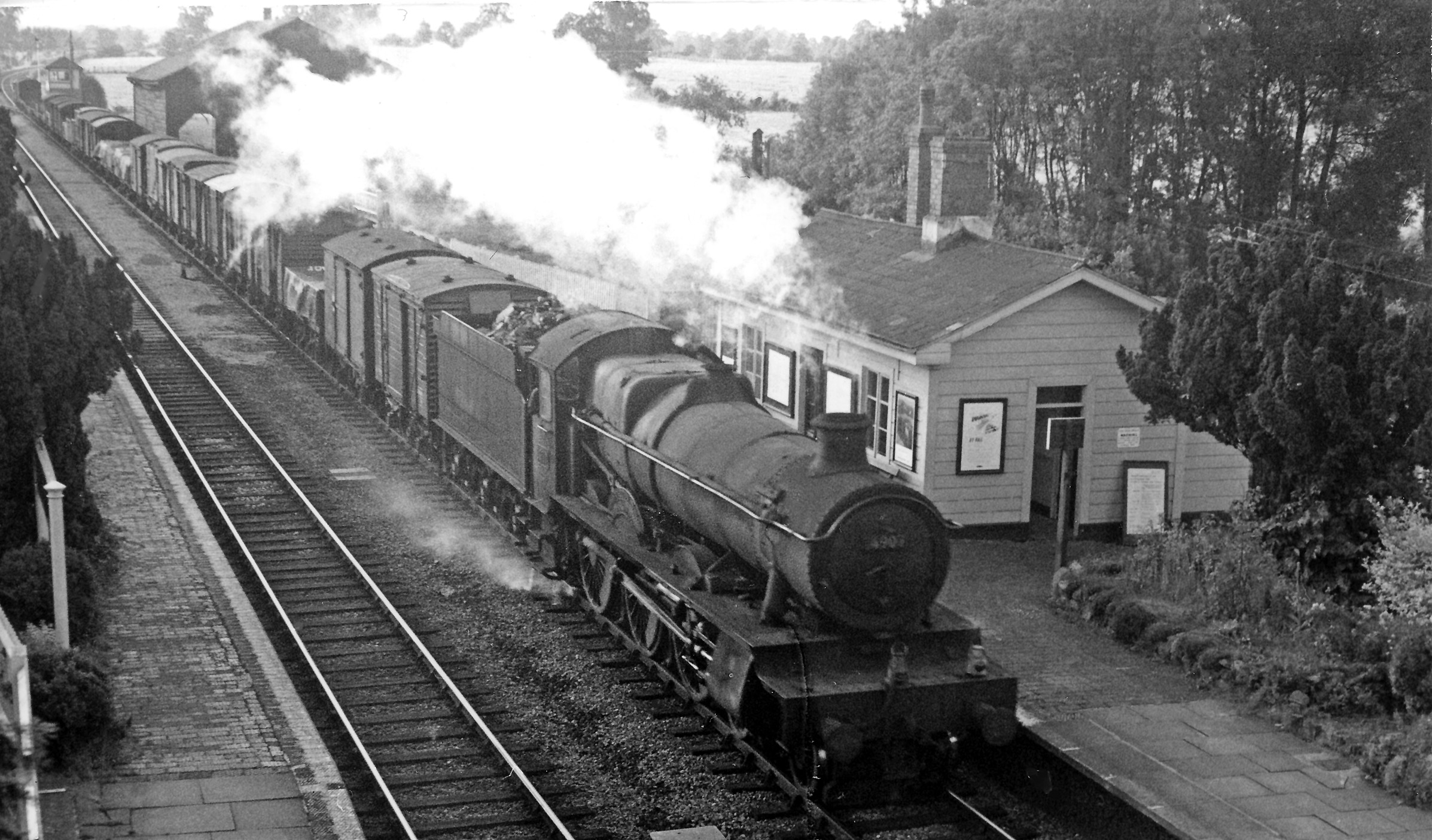
- Adlestrop station in 1961

General information
- Location: Adlestrop, Cotswold; England
- Coordinates: 51.9360°N 1.6591°W
- Grid reference: SP235264
- Platforms: 2

Other information
- Status: Disused

History
- Original company: Oxford, Worcester and Wolverhampton Railway
- Pre-grouping: Great Western Railway
- Post-grouping: Great Western Railway; Western Region of British Railways

Key dates
- 4 June 1853: Opened as Addlestrop and Stow Road
- 1 March 1862: Renamed Addlestrop
- 1 July 1883: Renamed Adlestrop
- 3 January 1966: Closed
Location

Adlestrop railway station was a railway station which served the village of Adlestrop in Gloucestershire, England, between 1853 and 1966. It was on what is now called the Cotswold Line. The station was immortalised in the poem "Adlestrop" by Edward Thomas after his train stopped there on 24 June 1914.

== History ==
Adlestrop station was opened on 4 June 1853 by the Oxford, Worcester and Wolverhampton Railway (OW&W) as part of the 40 mi (64 km) section of the Cotswold Line from Wolvercot Junction to Evesham. The line was originally mixed gauge single track throughout with a narrow gauge passing loop at Charlbury. The line through Adlestrop was dualled on 2 August 1858, after the sections between Wolvercot - Handborough and Handborough to Charlbury were respectively doubled on 18 November 1853 and 1 August 1854. The station had a broad gauge passing loop, but the only broad gauge train to use it was the inspection special, two days before opening. Adlestrop served the rural villages of Oddington and Adlestrop, for which Adlestrop House was the major feature.

Facilities for goods traffic were on the Up side (the side for passengers toward London): a 100 ft (30 m) loading bank which could hold four wagons, a 65 ft (20 m) goods shed with a 30 long cwt (1,500 kg) crane where a further three wagons could be held, with capacity for a further thirteen on the Worcester side of the shed. A signal box was added in 1907, which controlled access to the goods shed as well as to the refuge siding on the Down side which held 46 wagons. A 5-ton weighbridge was located on the Up side near the goods shed and main station building; this was replaced in 1938 by a 10-ton model which cost £160 (equivalent to £10,000 in 2023). The Down platform was 396 ft (121 m) long, while the Up platform was shorter at 270 ft (82 m). The main station building on the Up platform was timber-built and originally designed by Brunel, with the construction being completed by John Fowler. On the Down side a wooden waiting shelter was provided, behind which was the station house constructed in alternating courses of red and grey bricks.

On 1 January 1860 the OW&W became part of the West Midland Railway which, on 1 August 1863, was absorbed by the Great Western Railway. It then passed on to the Western Region of British Railways after nationalisation in 1948. British Railways closed Adlestrop to goods traffic on 26 August 1963 and to passenger traffic on 3 January 1966. The signal box closed on 27 April 1964 and the sidings were made redundant.

Preceding station	Historical railways	Following station
Kingham; Line and station open	Great Western Railway; Oxford, Worcester and Wolverhampton Railway	Moreton-in-Marsh; Line and station open

== The site today ==
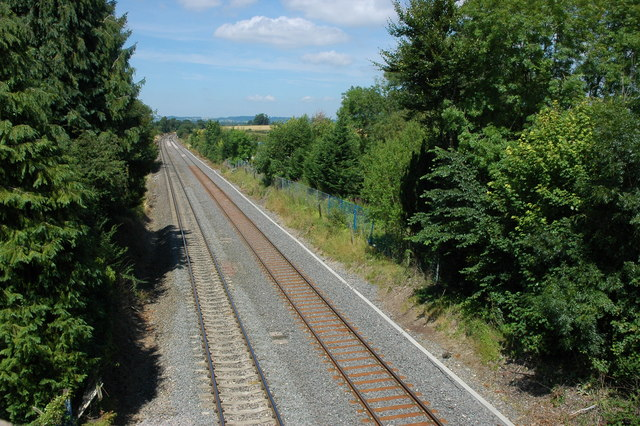
Adlestrop station site in 2008

The station building was demolished soon after closure in 1966. A station seat and one of the two station nameboards were rescued and were subsequently moved to a bus shelter in the village. The other nameboard was also rescued and given to the alma mater of Edward Thomas, Lincoln College, Oxford, and subsequently destroyed. Trains on the Cotswold Line pass the station site in the Evenlode Valley, where all evidence of its existence has vanished. The stationmaster's house is now a private residence, while the former goods yard is a vehicle dump.

== "Adlestrop" poem ==
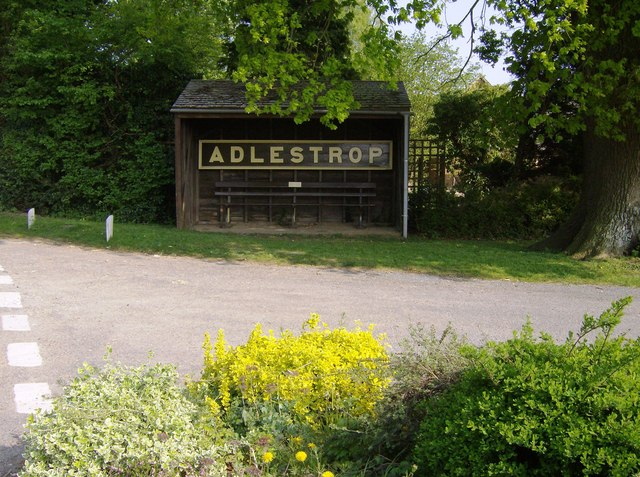
Adlestrop bus shelter with the station sign

Despite the station's demise, it is better-known today than many small stations still open as a result of the short poem "Adlestrop" by Edward Thomas, written in 1914, which recounts the moment in June that year when the train on which the poet was a passenger stopped at Adlestrop. Thomas's field note books show that the stop was made at 12.45 which corresponds to a scheduled down stopping service. Other elements in the poem are based on stops by the same train at Campden and Colwall. A bench bearing a plaque with the poem engraved on it was transferred to a bus shelter in the village.

== Notes ==
=== Sources ===
- Awdry, Christopher (1990). Encyclopaedia of British Railway Companies. Sparkford: Patrick Stephens Ltd. ISBN 1-8526-0049-7. OCLC 19514063. CN 8983.
- Butt, R. V. J. (October 1995). The Directory of Railway Stations: details every public and private passenger station, halt, platform and stopping place, past and present (1st ed.). Sparkford: Patrick Stephens Ltd. ISBN 978-1-85260-508-7. OCLC 60251199. OL 11956311M.
- Clinker, C. R. (October 1978). Clinker's Register of Closed Passenger Stations and Goods Depots in England, Scotland and Wales 1830-1977. Bristol: Avon-Anglia Publications & Services. ISBN 0-905466-19-5.
- Jowett, Alan (2000). Jowett's Nationalised Railway Atlas (1st ed.). Penryn, Cornwall: Atlantic Transport Publishers. ISBN 978-0-906899-99-1. OCLC 228266687.
- Leigh, Chris (1982) [1981]. GWR Country Stations. Shepperton: Ian Allan. ISBN 0-7110-1108-7.
- Potts, C. R. (1985). A Historical Survey of selected Great Western Railway stations (Volume 4). Poole, Dorset: Oxford Publishing Co. ISBN 978-0-86093-191-1.
- Stretton, John (2008). British Railways Past and Present: North Gloucestershire. Kettering, Northants: Past & Present Publishing. ISBN 978-1-85895-257-4.
- Harvey, Anne (1999). Adlestrop Revisited. Stroud, Gloucestershire: Sutton Publishing. ISBN 0-7509-2289-3.
