= Portsmouth City Museum =

Coordinates: 50.791636°N 1.097743°W

Portsmouth Museum
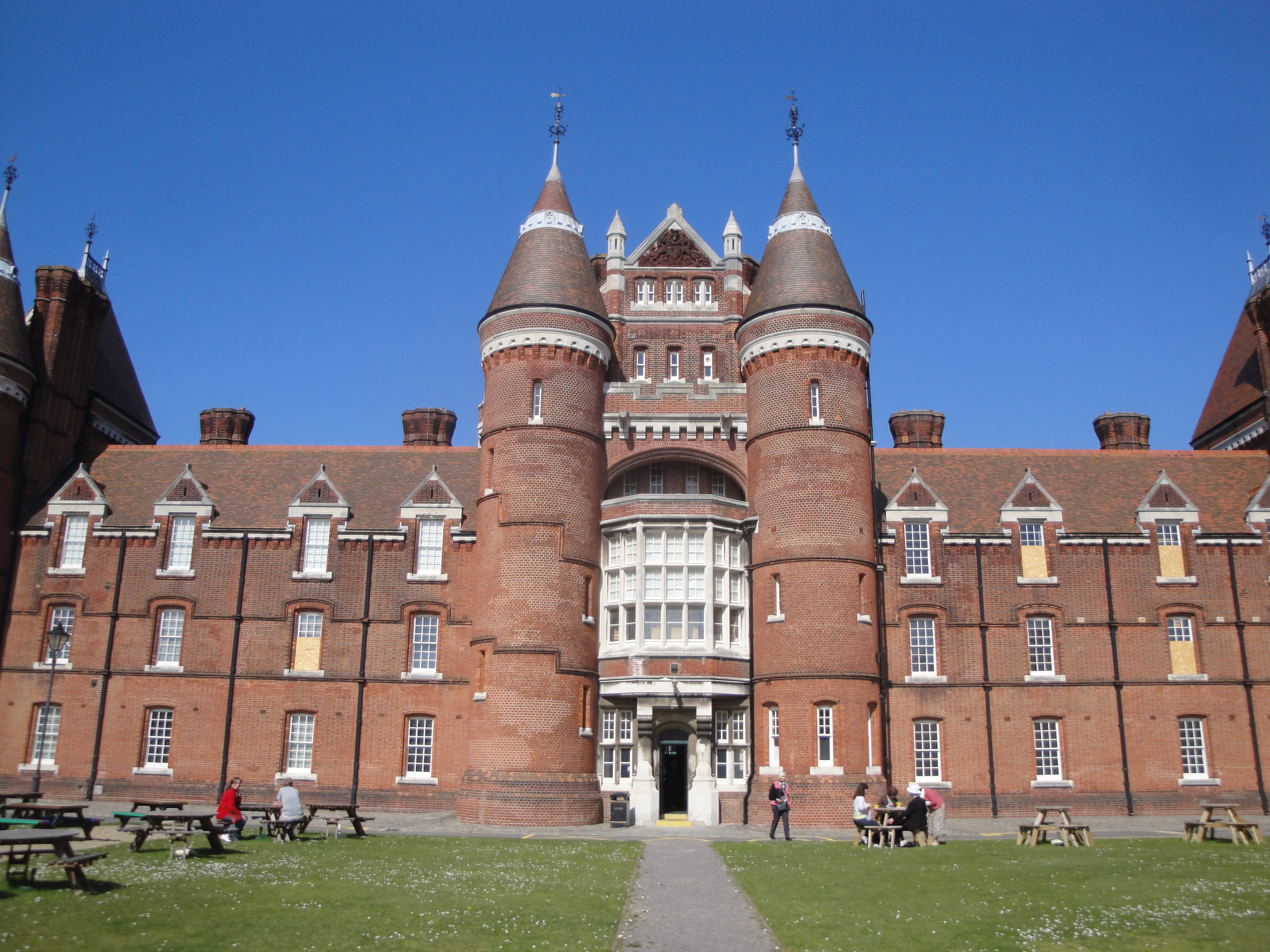
- Portsmouth Museum in March 2012

- Location within Hampshire
- Location: Portsmouth, Hampshire
- Type: Local museum, art gallery
- Website: portsmouthmuseum.co.uk

Portsmouth Museum (aka Portsmouth City Museum) is a local museum in Museum Road in the city of Portsmouth, southern England. It is one of six museums run by Portsmouth Museums, part of Portsmouth City Council. The museum is housed in a Grade II listed building.

== History ==
The building dates from the 1890s and was previously part of the Clarence and Victoria Barracks complex, which apart from the museum block, were demolished in 1967. It became the museum in 1972.

Until 2026, the museum included a display on the author Arthur Conan Doyle and his fictional creation, the detective Sherlock Holmes. Richard Lancelyn Green's Sir Arthur Conan Doyle Collection is one of the most wide-ranging in the world. It includes first editions of books, related letters, film and television memorabilia.

The story of Portsmouth is the name of those galleries which deal with the topic of what it was and is like to live in Portsmouth. These galleries are on the first floor and include 'Living in Portsmouth,' ‘No Place Like Pompey’ and ‘Portsmouth at Play.’ The first section looks back at life in the home, with reconstructions of rooms typical of specific people at different periods in history. The Football in the City display includes memorabilia from the 1939 and 2008 FA Cup Finals.

Fine and decorative arts are on display throughout Portsmouth Museum. Displays change but there is always a mixture of works on display drawn from the permanent collections. There are a selection of paintings, prints, sculpture, ceramics, furniture, glass and textiles, relating to Portsmouth from the 17th century to the 1950s.

The museum is currently closed until the 26th of October 2026 at which point it will host an exhibition as part of the Portsmouth 100 celebration.

== Architecture ==
The red brick building has stone dressings and tile roofs. The front of the four-storey building is of 17-bays. On each side are projecting towers.

== See also ==
- List of museums in Hampshire
