= Oakshott =

Hamlet in Hampshire, England

Coordinates: 51.0434°N 0.9373°W

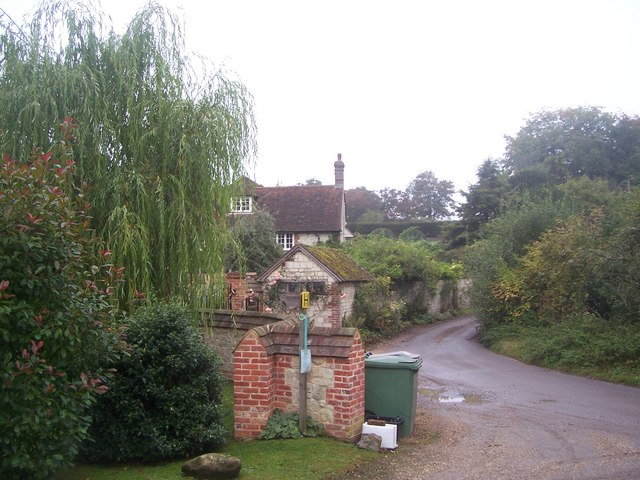
- Entering Oakshott hamlet

- Location within Hampshire
- OS grid reference: SU745276
- Civil parish: Hawkley
- District: East Hampshire
- Shire county: Hampshire
- Region: South East
- Country: England
- Sovereign state: United Kingdom
- Police: Hampshire and Isle of Wight
- Fire: Hampshire and Isle of Wight
- Ambulance: South Central

Oakshott is a hamlet in the East Hampshire district of Hampshire, England. It lies one mile (1. 6 km) south of the village of Hawkley and 2.5 miles (4 km) north of Petersfield.

The nearest railway station is Petersfield, 2.5 miles (4 km) south of the hamlet.
