= Overlord Embroidery =

Embroidery commemorating the D-Day invasion of Normandy

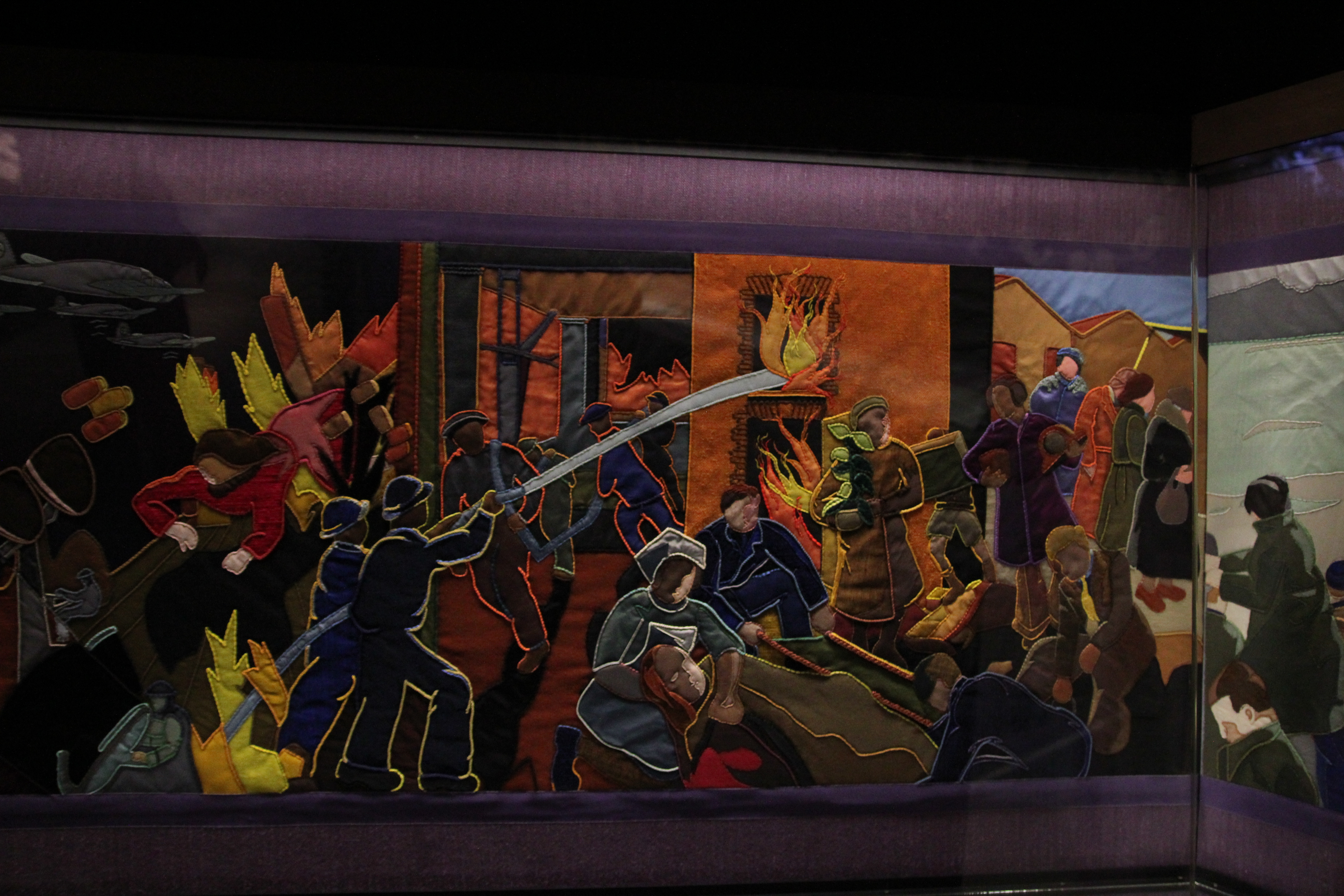
Part of the Overlord Embroidery showing The Blitz

The Overlord Embroidery, echoing the Bayeux Tapestry created 900 years before to commemorate the reverse invasion of England from Normandy, is a narrative embroidery that depicts the story of the D-Day Landings of 6 June 1944 and the subsequent Battle of Normandy. The story is told across 34 hand stitched panels running in total to 83 metres in length. The embroidery was created between 1968 and 1974, and is now on permanent display at The D-Day Story, Southsea, Portsmouth.

== Creation ==
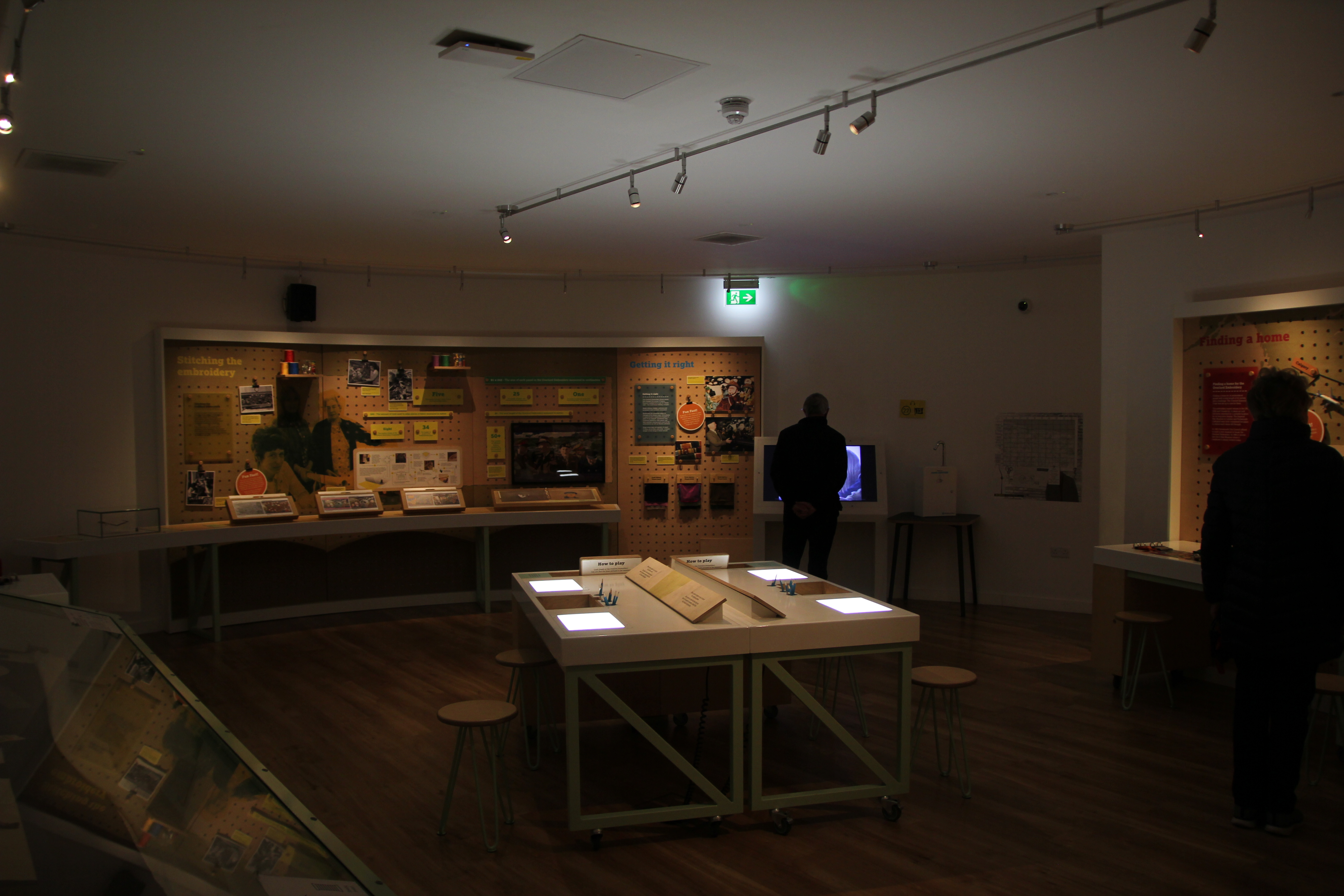
Part of the D-Day Story museum is dedicated to the creation of the embroidery.

The piece was commissioned by Lord Dulverton in 1968 and made by the Royal School of Needlework from designs by artist Sandra Lawrence.

In a speech delivered on 6 June 1978 Lord Dulverton described his motivation behind the commission.

The Embroidery is a tribute to our Country and Countrymen over the part played in defeating a great evil that sprang upon the Western World. It is not, and was never intended to be, a tribute to war, but to our people in whom it brought out in adversity so much that is good, determination, ingenuity, fortitude and sacrifice. It focusses upon one historic and explicitly important campaign, to which the world conflict had led and made possible; and the Bayeux Tapestry nearly 900 years before D-Day certainly beckoned it to be made.

— Lord Dulverton

Lord Dulverton established a committee which included retired senior officers to advise on the project. In preparing her designs Sandra Lawrence studied archive photographs as research. Her subsequent sketches were then submitted to the committee for approval. After approval, she would then paint a colour version to the same size as the planned embroidery panel (2.4x0.9 metres). Then she would then use tracing paper to record the outlines of all the details. The original paintings from the design stage hang at the Pentagon, Washington D.C.

The team from the Royal School of Needlework used the technique called appliqué to bring the designs to life. Then attached to linen using a method known as pricking and pouncing. That is pricking thousands of tiny holes in a tracing paper template, placing them on a panel and applying a fine powder known as pounce. This makes a trail of dots which are joined with a pencil to reveal the design.

The embroidery was completed in January 1974. Since 1984 it has been housed in the D-Day Museum (now renamed The D-Day Story) in Southsea, Portsmouth.

== Description ==
The embroidery tells the story of Operation Overlord, which was the code name for the Allied invasion of Normandy in June 1944. The narrative begins well before the invasion, with war-time production and The Blitz. It continues through the entry of the United States into the war, and the planning and preparation of the invasion. The majority of the work covers the crossing of the English Channel by the invasion fleet and the combat once the troops landed on the French coast. The embroidery ends with a scene of British infantry advancing as German troops retreat across the Seine.

There are 34 panels which together measure 83 metres (272 feet) in length. The Overlord Embroidery is one of the longest works of its kind in the world, at 10 metres (33 feet) longer than the Bayeux Tapestry, but shorter than the Prestonpans Tapestry. Twenty embroiderers worked for five years to create the embroidery. Battledress khaki and gold braid were appliquéd onto the panels.
