= Adlestrop (poem) =

1917 poem by Edward Thomas

"Adlestrop" is a poem by Edward Thomas. It is based on a railway journey Thomas took on 24 June 1914, during which his train briefly stopped at the now-closed station in the Gloucestershire village of Adlestrop.

Thomas only began writing poetry in the winter of 1914/15, but in his notebook he recorded the occasion on the day of the journey in detail, noting that the train, from Paddington to Malvern, had stopped at Adlestrop at 12:15, with a further stop for signals at Campden. He noted down the grass, the willows, the willowherb and meadowsweet, the blackbirds and silence interrupted by the hiss of steam at these two stops. The poem itself was written later: he began making notes for it the following January, and created several versions of the poem before it was ready for publication. Since then, the poem has become a symbolic turning point in Thomas's literary career, and is used as such in the title of Jean Moorcroft Wilson's 2015 biography of the poet.

Although not strictly a war poem, this particular piece has gained popularity in anthologies due to its reference to a peaceful era and location, which existed only a short time before the outbreak of the First World War. Thomas enlisted the following year, and was killed in 1917, just before the poem was due to be printed in his collection Poems, published by Henry Holt and Company. It was published in the New Statesman, three weeks after he died. Thomas's earlier career had mainly been as a writer of prose, his first collection of poems having been published only in 1916. Many attribute the shift in his creative direction to the influence of Robert Frost.

One hundred years to the day after the original journey, an "Adlestrop Centenary Special" Cotswold Line train was arranged, carrying 200 passengers from Oxford to Moreton-in-Marsh and stopping at Adlestrop in the place where the station formerly stood. Adlestrop village also held a celebration to mark the centenary, with a public reading of the poem by Robert Hardy.

An anthology of poems and prose responding to and examining the poem, Adlestrop Revisited, edited by Anne Harvey, was published by The History Press.

The text of the poem is used on the album Adlestrop by Gilroy Mere, and its mood informs the album - the sounds of trains, birds, and evoking the English summer - which is themed around rural railway stations that were closed in the 1960s.

Adlestrop

Yes. I remember Adlestrop
The name, because one afternoon
Of heat, the express-train drew up there
Unwontedly. It was late June.

The steam hissed. Someone cleared his throat.
No one left and no one came
On the bare platform. What I saw
Was Adlestrop—only the name

And willows, willow-herb, and grass,
And meadowsweet, and haycocks dry,
No whit less still and lonely fair
Than the high cloudlets in the sky.

And for that minute a blackbird sang
Close by, and round him, mistier,
Farther and farther, all the birds
Of Oxfordshire and Gloucestershire.
