= Eastleigh Museum =

Former museum in Eastleigh, England

Coordinates: 50.9682°N 1.3538°W

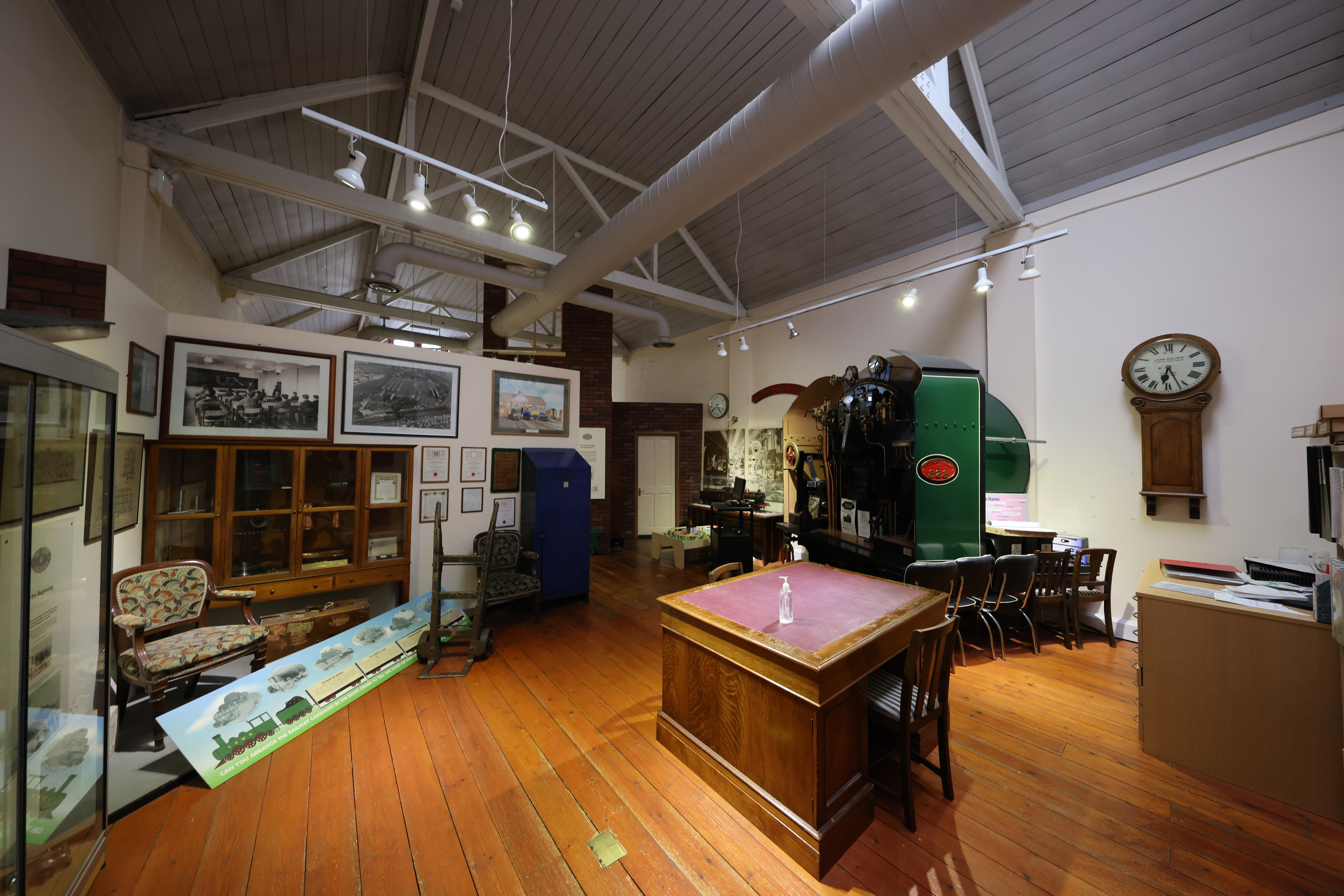
Eastleigh Museum gallery

Eastleigh Museum was a museum situated in Eastleigh, a town in Hampshire, England, which opened in October 1986. In 2014, ownership of the Eastleigh Museum was transferred to the Hampshire Cultural Trust as part of a larger transfer of museums from Hampshire County Council and Winchester City Council.

The town was originally developed as a railway town by the London and South Western Railway from 1884. The museum exhibits explored how the railway led to growth in the area. The main attraction was the story of a typical railway engineer and his family, Mr and Mrs Brown, during the 1930s. The exhibition showed Mr and Mrs Brown's living room. There were also temporary exhibitions and interactive activities and games. The museum had a shop and café.

The museum closed at the end of March 2022. The building was put up for sale in October 2025.
