= The D-Day Story =

War Museum in Portsmouth, England

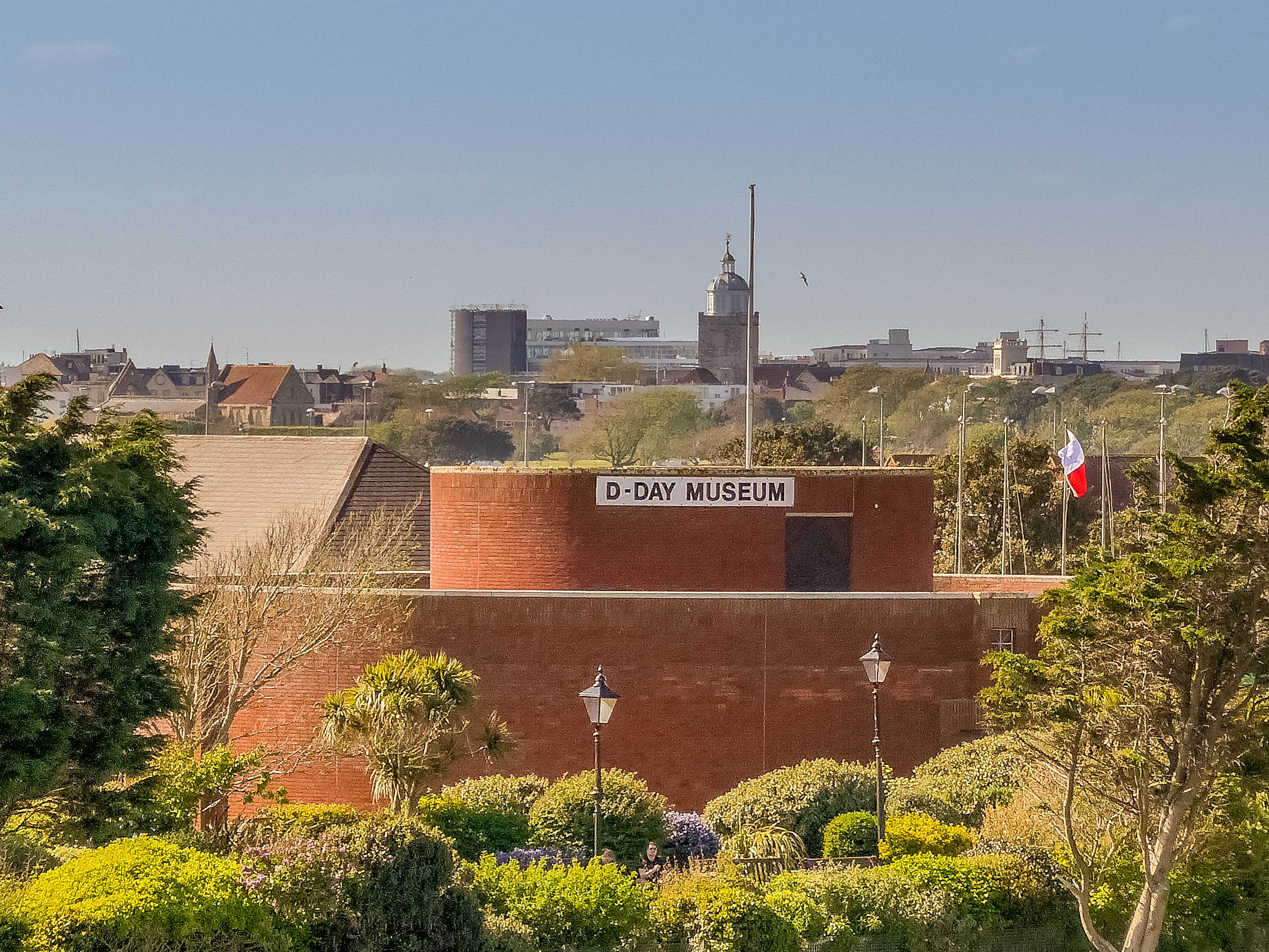
- View from Southsea seafront

- Location within Hampshire
- Former name: The D-Day Museum
- Established: 1984
- Location: Clarence Esplanade, Portsmouth, United Kingdom
- Coordinates: 50°46.788′N 1°05.360′W
- Type: War Museum
- Key holdings: Overlord Embroidery
- Collections: Military; 20th Century
- Public transit access: D-Day Museum (Bus); Portsmouth Harbour (Train)
- Parking: On Site (charges apply)
- Website: theddaystory.com

The D-Day Story (formerly the D-Day Museum) is a visitor attraction located in Southsea, Portsmouth in Hampshire, England. It tells the story of Operation Overlord during the Normandy D-Day landings. Originally opened as the D-Day Museum in 1984 by Queen Elizabeth The Queen Mother, it reopened as the D-Day Story, following a refurbishment funded by a £5 million Heritage Lottery grant, in March 2018. The museum building was designed by the then city architect Ken Norrish.

== Contents ==
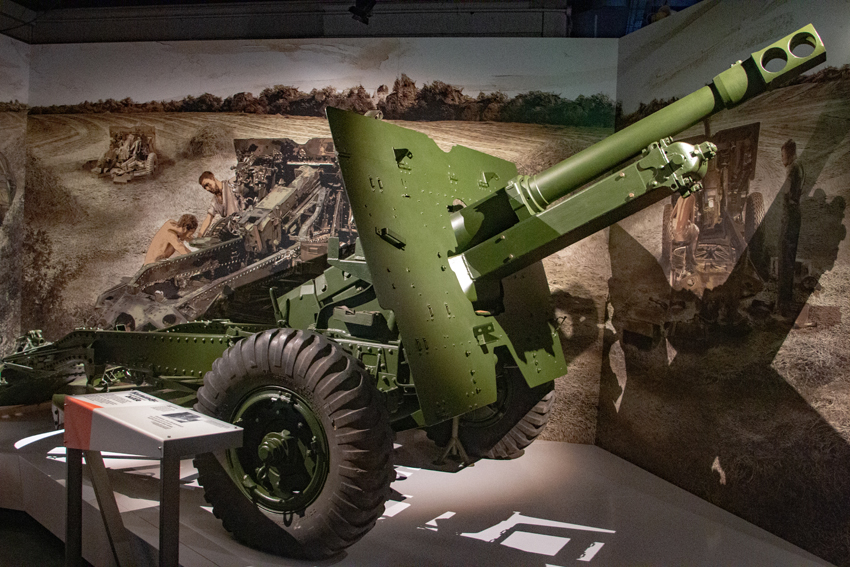
25pdr field gun display

The story is told in three parts: Preparation; D-Day and the Battle of Normandy; Legacy and the Overlord Embroidery.

The Legacy gallery features the Overlord Embroidery, commissioned by Lord Dulverton to remember those who took part in D-Day and the Battle of Normandy. The embroidery took twenty members of the Royal School of Needlework seven years to complete and measures 272 feet (83 m) long. It consists of 34 different panels. Film clips of veterans talking about their experiences give visitors further insight into what took place.

Since August 2020, the ticket to the D-Day Story has included access to landing craft tank LCT 7074, which is displayed outside the museum. She is the last remaining D-Day landing craft of her kind. On LCT 7074 visitors can explore the tank deck, the upper deck, and the bridge deck. A Sherman Grizzly tank and a Churchill Crocodile tank are displayed on the tank deck. Other vehicles in the collection include a Sherman BARV and a DUKW amphibious vehicle. A replica landing craft personnel can be seen as part of an audio-visual display inside the museum. There are reconstructions of the operations room at Southwick House, a 1940s sitting room and an Anderson shelter. Audio guides in English and other languages are available for the museum galleries and the Overlord Embroidery.

== Refurbishment ==
The museum closed in March 2017 for one year to undergo a £5 million refurbishment and allow for conservation work on exhibits. New exhibits include the "pencil that started the invasion" – the pencil used by Lt. Cdr. John Harmer to sign the order for Force G, the naval forces assigned to Gold Beach, to sail to Normandy.
