= Flora Twort =

English painter

Flora C. Twort
- Born: June 24, 1893; Yeovil, Somerset, England
- Died: September 20, 1985 (aged 92); Petersfield, England
- Style: Pastels, watercolour

Flora Caroline Twort (24 June 1893 - 20 September 1985) was an English painter who specialised in watercolours and pastels of the scenes and people of Petersfield, Hampshire.

== Early life and education ==
Flora was born at Yeovil, Somerset, the daughter of Albert Samuel Twort and Jane (nee Rapley. Her father was a surveyor of taxes with the Inland Revenue, an employment that required constant relocation. By March 1898, he and his family had moved to Truro in Cornwall, where they remained for several years, before moving to Lambeth, and then Hampstead.

Twort began painting at the age of four, and was educated at the South Hampstead High School, London School of Art, the Regent Street Polytechnic and the Slade School of Art.

Twort was a friend of Nevil Shute, who in 1925 proposed marriage to her, unsuccessfully, though they remained lifelong friends and she became godmother to his daughter Shirley Anne. For a short period in 1939, Shute and his family lived at The Old Mill at Langstone, which she owned.

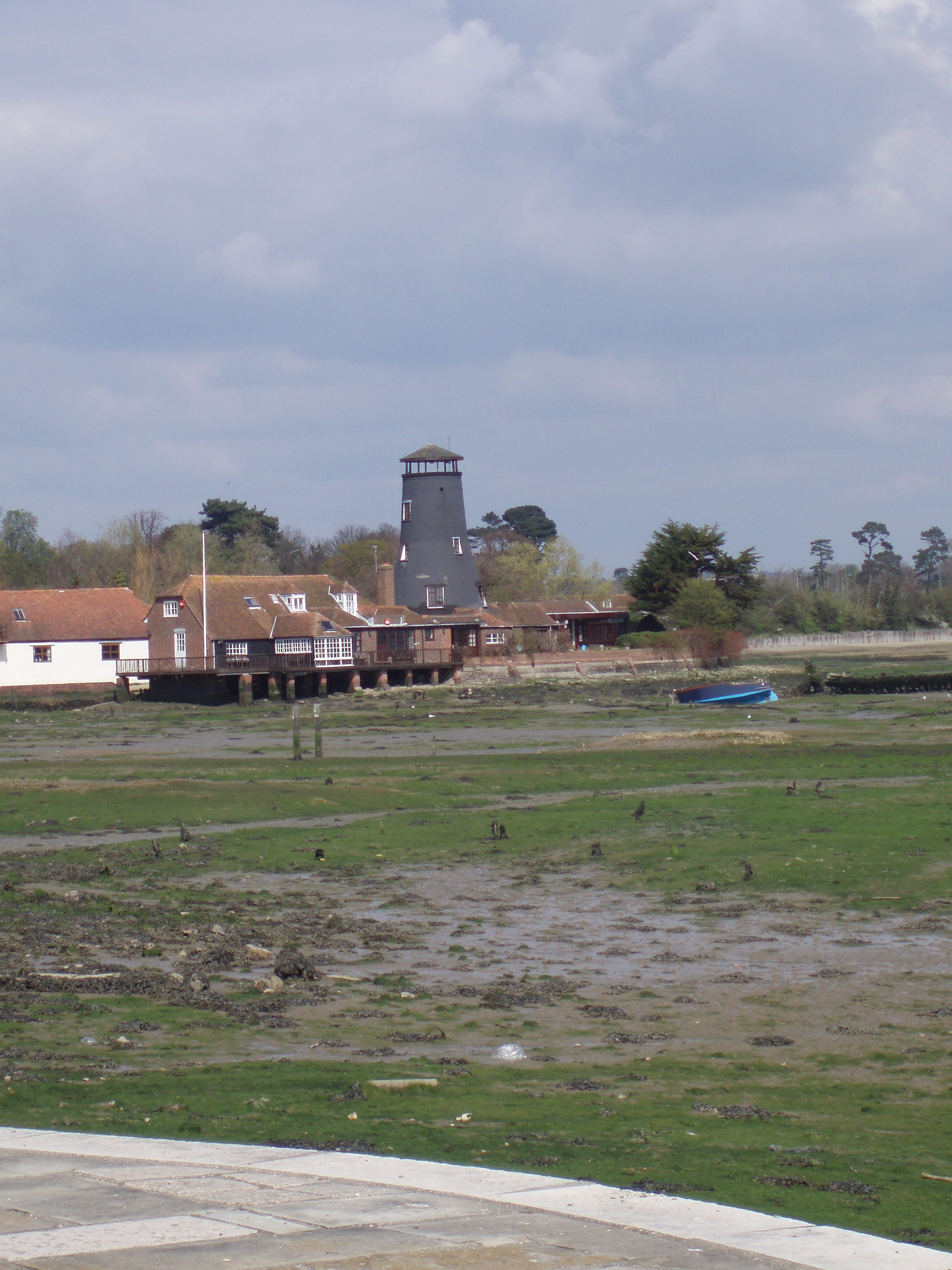
The Old Mill, Langstone

== Career ==
At the end of World War I she moved to Petersfield, where she ran a secondhand bookshop at Numbers 1 and 2 The Square, in partnership with two other young women. The shop also sold handmade jewellery, pottery and textiles and gained a reputation as one of the finest book shops in the South of England. In 1934 she joined the Society of Women Artists.

Her pictures, usually watercolours, typically contain local scenes of Petersfield which are filled with people and animals, with such subjects as The Square on Market Day, or the fair on Petersfield Heath. She also produced drawings in pencil, crayon, charcoal and pastel, including portraits.

Her studio was above this shop until 1948, when the three partners decided to give up the shop and Twort moved to a studio in the nearby Church Path. Her work was exhibited in the Royal Academy and other London galleries. She continued to paint until she was 81.

On her death in 1985 she bequeathed her studio cottage and pictures to Hampshire County Council. A selection of her pictures is now displayed in her old studios, which have become the Flora Twort Gallery; the selection is changed twice per year. Hampshire County Council has also put 600 of her pictures online.
