= Twisleton =

Twisleton is a surname, and may refer to:

- Charlotte Twisleton née Wattell (1770-1812), English actress
- Edward Turner Boyd Twisleton (born 1809), British Poor Law Commissioner, son of Thomas Twisleton
- Francis Morphet Twisleton (1873–1917), New Zealand soldier
- Frederick Benjamin Twisleton (1799–1887), also Frederick Fiennes, 16th Baron Saye and Sele, son of Thomas Twisleton
- Sir George Twisleton, 1st Baronet (c.1605–1635)
- George Twisleton (1618–1667), English politician
- John Twisleton (c.1614–1682), English Cromwellian baronet
- Philip Twisleton (died 1678), English New Model Army officer
- Thomas Twisleton (1770/1–1824), English Archdeacon of Colombo, son of Thomas Twisleton, 13th Baron Saye and Sele
- Thomas Twisleton, 13th Baron Saye and Sele (c.1735–1788), British Army officer

== See also ==
- Twisleton-Wykeham-Fiennes family
