= Fiennes =

Fiennes or Ffiennes may refer to:

== Places ==
- Fiennes, a commune of the Pas-de-Calais département in northern France.

== People ==
A toponymic surname pronounced /ˈfaɪnz/ and borne by a prominent English family, descendant from Eustace I Fiennes, a nobleman in the 11th century from the region of Fiennes, then in County of Boulogne and part of Flanders. Better-known family members are:

- James Fiennes, 1st Baron Saye and Sele (1395–1450)
- Richard Fiennes, 7th Baron Dacre (1415–1483)
- Bessie Fiennes (1498–1540), née Bessie Blount, a mistress of Henry VIII
- William Fiennes, 1st Viscount Saye and Sele (1582-1662)
- Nathaniel Fiennes (1608–1669), politician
- Celia Fiennes, (1662–1741), travel writer
- Geoffrey Twisleton-Wykeham-Fiennes, 18th Baron Saye and Sele (1858–1937)
- Gerry Fiennes (1906–1985), British railway manager
- Martin Fiennes, 22nd Baron Saye and Sele (born 1961)
- Sir Maurice Alberic Twisleton-Wykeham-Fiennes (1907–1974), businessman, father of Mark Fiennes,
- Nathaniel Fiennes, 21st Baron Saye and Sele (1920–2024)
- Mark Fiennes (1933–2004), photographer and illustrator. Father of:
  - Ralph Fiennes (born 1962), actor
  - Martha Fiennes (born 1964), film director and producer. Mother of:
    - Hero Fiennes Tiffin (born 1997), actor and model
  - Magnus Fiennes (born 1965), composer and record producer
  - Sophie Fiennes (born 1967), film director and producer
  - Joseph Fiennes (born 1970), actor
- Ranulph Fiennes (born 1944), adventurer
- Susannah Fiennes (born 1961), artist
- William Fiennes (author) (born 1970), writer

See Category:Fiennes family for a larger list.

- Henri Léopold de Fiennes (1898–1985), American film director known as Henry Hathaway

== Given name ==
- Fiennes Cornwallis (1831–1867), a British Army officer
- Fiennes Cornwallis, 1st Baron Cornwallis (1864–1935), son of the above
- Fiennes Cornwallis, 3rd Baron Cornwallis (1921–2010), grandson of the above
- Fiennes Barrett-Lennard (1880–1963), British colonial judge and soldier

== See also ==
- Fynes

For members of the Fiennes family:

- Baron Saye and Sele
- Viscount Saye and Sele
- Twisleton-Wykeham-Fiennes family
- Lord Dacre
