= Martin Fiennes, 22nd Baron Saye and Sele =

English peer and businessman

Martin Guy Fiennes, 22nd Baron Saye and Sele, DL (né Twisleton-Wykeham-Fiennes; born 27 February 1961), styled as Lord Saye and Sele, is an English peer and businessman.

== Family and education ==
Fiennes is the second son of Nathaniel Fiennes, 21st Baron Saye and Sele (1920−2024), who changed the family's surname from Twisleton-Wykeham-Fiennes to Fiennes by deed poll in 1965, and Mariette Helena Salisbury-Jones (born 1935) and a grandson of Sir Guy Salisbury-Jones. He became heir to the barony of Saye and Sele in 2001 following the death of his older brother, Richard, from epilepsy. His twin sister is the artist Susannah Fiennes and his youngest brother is the writer William Fiennes; another brother, Thomas, died in a road accident in 1968 at the age of three.

A member of the Twisleton-Wykeham-Fiennes family, he is a cousin of the actor Ralph Fiennes and the explorer Sir Ranulph Fiennes.

After attending Eton College, Fiennes studied at Brasenose College, Oxford, before completing an MBA at Ashridge Management College.

On 28 September 1996 he married Pauline Kang Chai Lian, with whom he has three sons: Guy Fiennes (b. 1997), Ned Richard Ling Fiennes (b. 1999) and Ivo Fiennes (b. 2000).

== Career ==
Fiennes works in venture capital and joined Oxford Science Enterprises in 2015. He also manages the family seat, Broughton Castle, and in 2018 was appointed Deputy Lieutenant of Oxfordshire.

He succeeded his father as Lord Saye and Sele in 2024.

Peerage of England
Preceded by Nathaniel Fiennes, 21st Baron Saye and Sele	Baron Saye and Sele; 2024−present	Succeeded by
