= Geoffrey Twisleton-Wykeham-Fiennes, 18th Baron Saye and Sele =

English soldier and Liberal politician

The Right Honourable The Lord Saye and Sele
- Portrait by Walter Stoneman, c. 1916

Comptroller of the Household
- In office 1 November 1912 – 25 May 1915
- Monarch: George V
- Prime Minister: H. H. Asquith
- Preceded by: The Earl of Liverpool
- Succeeded by: Charles Henry Roberts

Personal details
- Born: 3 August 1858 Kensington, London
- Died: 2 February 1937 (aged 78) Broughton Castle, Oxfordshire, England
- Party: Liberal
- Spouse(s): Marion Lawes (1863–1946)

Geoffrey Cecil Twisleton-Wykeham-Fiennes, 18th Baron Saye and Sele (3 August 1858 – 2 February 1937) was an English soldier and Liberal politician from the Twisleton-Wykeham-Fiennes family. He served as Comptroller of the Household between 1912 and 1915.

== Early life and education ==
Saye and Sele was born in Kensington, the eldest son of John Twisleton-Wykeham-Fiennes, 17th Baron Saye and Sele, and his wife, Lady Augusta Sophia Hay, daughter of Thomas Hay-Drummond, 11th Earl of Kinnoull. Sir Eustace Twisleton-Wykeham-Fiennes, 1st Baronet, was his younger brother. He was educated at Eton College.

== Military career ==
Twisleton-Wykeham-Fiennes was gazetted into the 108th Foot of the Oxfordshire Militia on 22 January 1879, the date of the Battle of Isandlwana. His father, who was anxious for his eldest son to see active service in the Anglo-Zulu War, had him transferred to the 2nd Battalion of the Royal Scots Fusiliers, and he was sent to South Africa to "avenge" the massacre at Isandlwana.

Twisleton-Wykeham-Fiennes acted as secretary to Sir Henry Bulwer, then the Governor of Maritzburg, and accompanied the column that captured Sikukuni. The next year, he joined the 1st Battalion of his regiment at Secunderabad, British India, and returned to England eight months later.

He was promoted to captain in 1887. In 1890, he made adjutant of the 3rd (Militia) Battalion, of which he was later to be Hon. Colonel, and retired in 1899.

On 2 June 1902, he was appointed Lieutenant-Colonel in command of the 3rd (Militia) Battalion of the Royal Scots Fusiliers, based in Ayr. He was appointed an Honorary Colonel of the Battalion in 1907. During the First World War, he served as an Area Commandant in Flanders. He was also a Lieutenant-Colonel in the 3rd Battalion of the Middlesex County Regiment.

== Business and political career ==
After retiring from the Army in 1899, Twisleton-Wykeham-Fiennes entered private industry, spending the next few years as a salesman for a well-known brewing firm. He travelled frequently to South Africa, Malta, and Mediterranean stations occupied by British troops.

In 1907, he succeeded his father in the barony and entered the House of Lords, where he was a staunch Liberal. He promoted a School Attendance Bill and a Bill dealing with the abuses of the traffic in worn-out horses. From 1912 to 1915 he served under H. H. Asquith as Comptroller of the Household. He was an active member of the Home Counties Liberal Federation, and was chairman of the National Land and Home League. He was also on the Standing Joint Committee of the Oxfordshire County Council, and in 1930 he became High Steward of the City of Oxford.

== Family ==
Twisleton-Wykeham-Fiennes married Marion Ruperta Murray, daughter of Major Robert Bartholomew Lawes, on 20 February 1884. They had five sons and two daughters:

- Geoffrey Rupert Cecil Twisleton-Wykeham-Fiennes, 19th Baron Saye and Sele (27 December 1884 – 18 February 1949), died unmarried
- Ivo Murray Twisleton-Wykeham-Fiennes, 20th Baron Saye and Sele OBE MC (15 December 1885 – 21 October 1968) married Hersey Cecilia Hester Butler, daughter of Capt. Sir Thomas Dacres Butler, and had issue
- Evelyn Idonia Twisleton-Wykeham-Fiennes (12 January – 28 July 1887)
- G. Capt. Hon. Laurence John Evelyn Twisleton-Wykeham-Fiennes (4 October 1890 – 16 May 1962), died unmarried
- Ingelram Robert Nathaniel (5 January 1895 – 28 December 1896)
- Hon. Allen Rupert Ingelram Twisleton-Wykeham-Fiennes MC (25 September 1897 – 10 October 1920), killed in a motorcycle accident
- Hon. Cicely Marion Violet Joan Twisleton-Wykeham-Fiennes (22 November 1900 – 14 August 1985), married John William Dunne, son of Gen. Sir John Hart Dunne

He died at the family seat of Broughton Castle in Oxfordshire in February 1937, aged 78, and was succeeded in the barony by his eldest son, Geoffrey. Lady Saye and Sele died 27 July 1946, aged 82.

Political offices
Preceded by The Earl of Liverpool	Comptroller of the Household; 1912–1915	Succeeded by Charles Henry Roberts
Peerage of England
Preceded by John Twisleton-Wykeham-Fiennes	Baron Saye and Sele; 1907–1937	Succeeded by Geoffrey Twisleton-Wykeham-Fiennes
