= Charlotte Wattell =

English actress

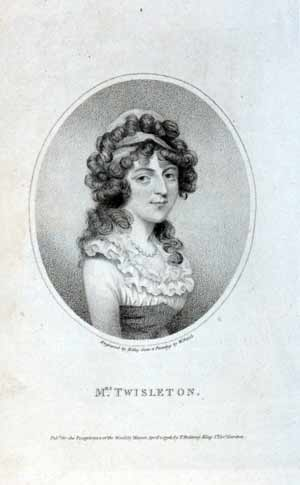
Charlotte Wattell in 1796

Charlotte Wattell (5 October 1770 – December 1812) was an English actress of the late 18th and early 19th-centuries and the first wife of the churchman Thomas James Twisleton.

Born in London in 1770 as Charlotte Anne Frances Wattell, the daughter of John Wattell (died 1824) and Caroline née Stonehouse (1743-1829), the sister of Sir John Stonehouse, she was the first wife of Thomas Twisleton.

== Marriage and the stage ==
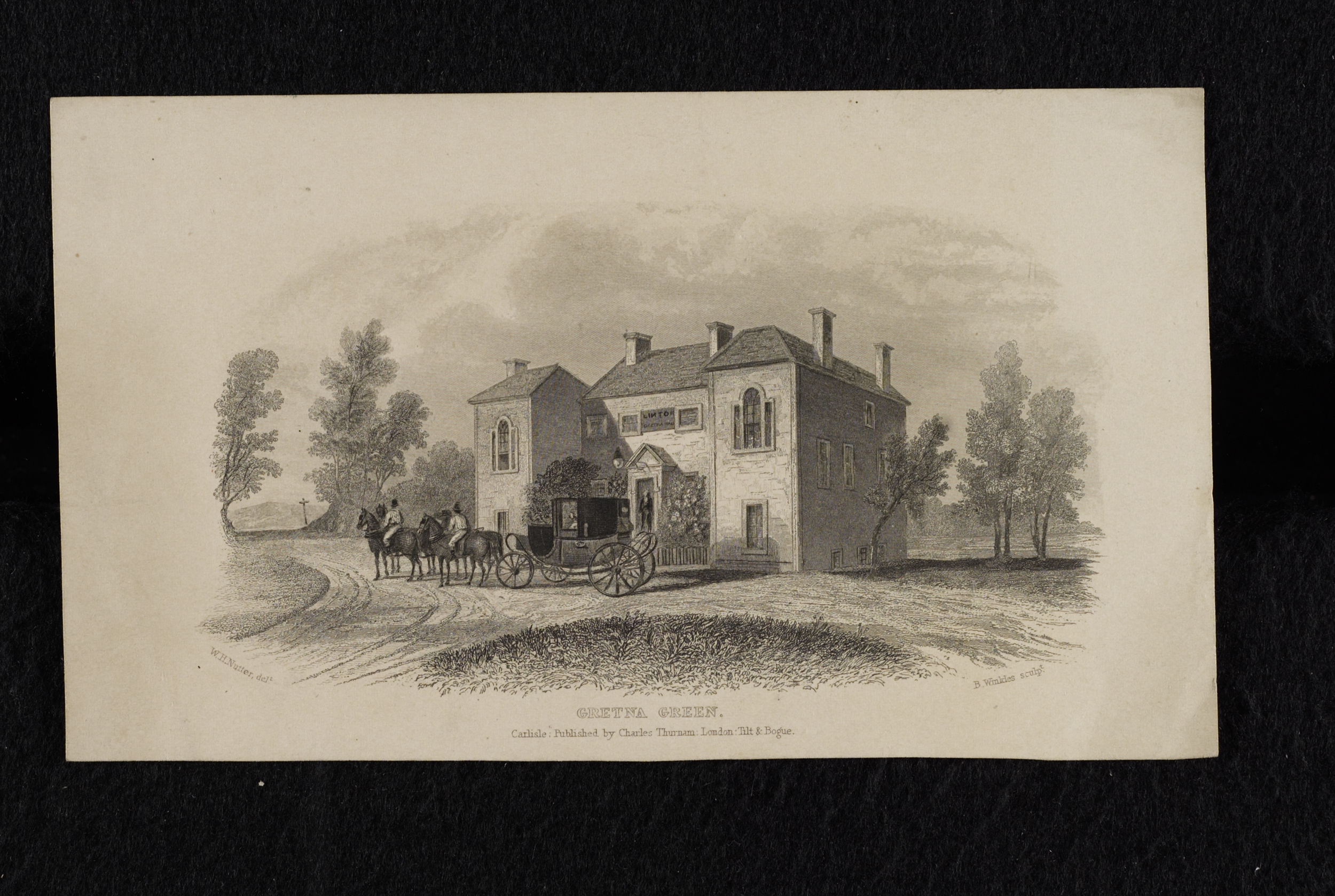
Historic view of Gretna Green to where Twisleton and Wattell eloped in 1788

Her first marriage was at about the age of 17, the result of an elopement with Thomas James Twisleton, the second son of Thomas Twisleton, 13th Baron Saye and Sele; he was also aged 17 and a pupil at Westminster School when their mutual interest in amateur dramatics brought them together. He had already acted in school plays in Latin and had also appeared in more recent works with his mother and sister and other amateur actors at Adlestrop House. In May 1788 he and Wattell had played together as Mentevole and Julia in an amateur performance of Julia by Robert Jephson, at Freemasons' Hall, London, and in September of that year they eloped and were married at Gretna Green in Scotland, going through a more regular wedding ceremony after at St. Marylebone Church in London on 4 November 1788. The newspapers at the time reported on the marriage of the second son of a lord to a minor provincial heiress, and this interest only increased when the couple continued acting in amateur dramatics, before turning professional. They performed together at Adlestrop House and elsewhere for a year or so, attracting public attention. If reports from the time are true, the couple were under no financial necessity to act as Charlotte Wattell had a considerable fortune, as recorded in one newspaper on 8 October 1788: "Mr Twistleton, by his marriage with Miss Wattle, has got possession of an amiable little girl, that must make any man the happiest of Triflers: -- the lady's age is about eighteen and her fortune about £4,000".

== The professional stage ==
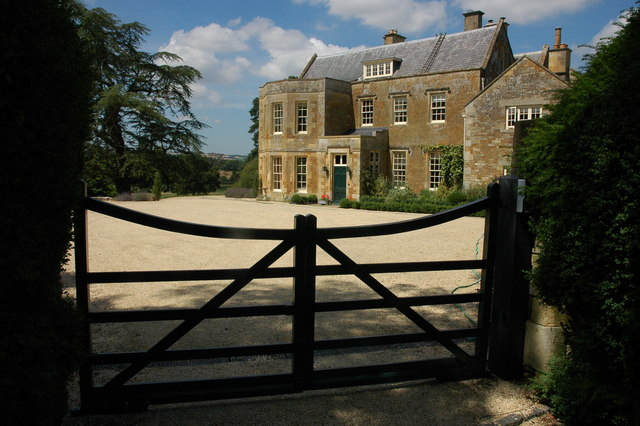
The couple acted together as amateurs at Adlestrop House before turning professional

Twisleton was a friend of the Leigh family who were related to Jane Austen, and in 1789 the newly married couple performed in amateur theatricals at Adlestrop House, the home of the Leighs, with Charlotte playing Matilda and Thomas as Edwin in Francklin's tragedy Matilda, and this is considered a contribution to the use by Jane Austen of amateur theatricals as a plot device in her novel Mansfield Park.

Wattell had four sons and a daughter, with all the sons dying young: Julia Eliza Twisleton (1789–1832); Francis Henry Thomas Twisleton (1790–1792); Thomas Twisleton (1791-1791); Fienes Twisleton (1792–1792), and Henry Charles Twisleton (1794–1798). Later, Thomas Twisleton would only acknowledge Julia Eliza as his child. Julia Twisleton was to marry Captain James Brown in 1808.

== Separation and divorce ==
A change of heart by Twisleton about acting with his wife, in early 1794, perhaps brought on by pressure from his now widowed mother, precipitated a change of direction in his life, involving taking a degree at St. Mary Hall, Oxford, and preparing for the Church, the traditional career path for the second son of a lord. He experienced money problems and the couple separated in June 1794, with Twisleton petitioning Parliament for a bill of separation. Meanwhile, Charlotte made her debut as Belvidera in Venice Preserv'd at Covent Garden in February 1794.

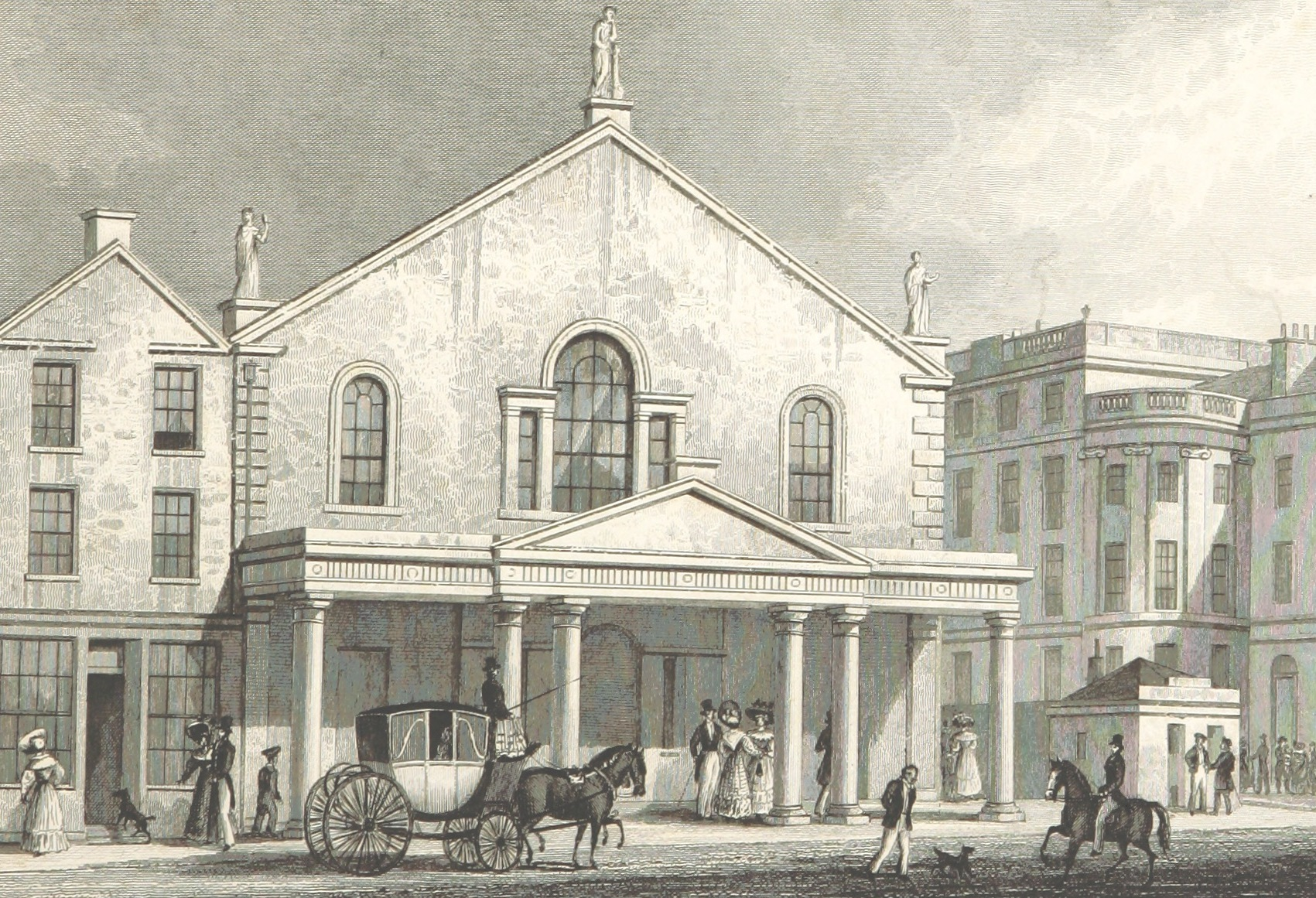
The Theatre Royal in Edinburgh where Wattell appeared in 1796

On separating from her husband Charlotte Wattell continued with her stage career, appearing with Kemble as Calista in The Fair Penitent and as Leonora in Lovers Quarrels at the Theatre Royal in Edinburgh in January 1796, and she remained in Edinburgh until March 1796; it was in Edinburgh that she met John Stein, a merchant, who would father her son Charles Twistleton (1797-after 1863). The Monthly Mirror states that Mrs. Twisleton was performing in Hull from May to July 1796.

On 3 March 1798 the newspapers reported that Thomas Twisleton had obtained a divorce at Doctors' Commons, claiming that his wife had been openly living as husband and wife with John Stein (1769-1854), who was MP for Bletchingly (1796-1802), since at least June 1796, with Charlotte Wattell referring to herself as Mrs. Stein, and that in 1797 she had given birth to a son with Stein, who, as he had been born before her divorce from her husband, she had named Charles Twisleton.

"A petition was presented from Mrs Twistleton's mother against an allegation contained in the preamble of the Bill, respecting a child born seven months after a deed of separation had taken place between Mr Twistleton and his wife; but the Counsel had already been instructed to omit that part of the allegation.

The usual forms were then gone through, and a witness proved that a Mr. Steele and Mrs Twistleton had lived together as man and wife. A deed of separation was then read, by which Mr Twistleton had settled an annuity of £100 per annum upon his wife during her life, and in consequence of which an actual separation took place . . . . previous to any criminal conduct on her part. Mr Twistleton, agreeable to the late adopted standing orders for Divorces, was called to the Bar, and examined upon oath as to his motives for having granted this deed of settlement, which, he said, was on account of her extravagance threatening him with ruin; and her extreme partiality for the Stage depriving him of all domestic happiness, and on which she actually appeared, much against his will."

== Later life ==
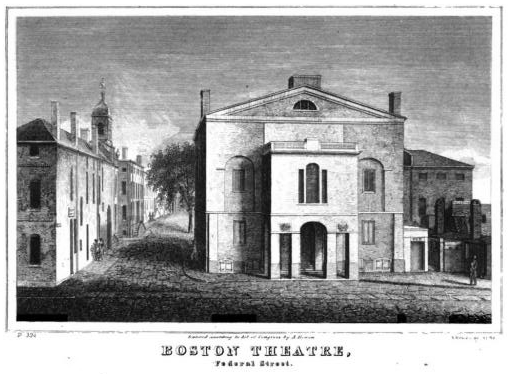
Wattell appeared at the Federal Street Theatre in Boston

She married Thomas Sandon on 11 July 1799 in St. George's church in Hanover Square, London. The couple acted together as 'Stanley' under which name they appeared together in York in 1800. It is not known what became of Sandon, but Charlotte Wattell is recorded as acting as Mrs. Stanley at the Federal Street Theatre in Boston in Massachusetts, and was later seen on stage in Halifax in Nova Scotia on 5 March 1811. The Columbian Centinel of 26 December 1812 recorded that Mrs Stanley had recently died in Burlington, Vermont aged about 42.

While touring North America she left her son Charles Twisleton behind. By this time his father John Stein had fallen on hard times but contributed what he could to his son's upkeep. The death of his mother in 1811 when he was aged 14 forced Charles onto his own resources and he went to sea, as a result of which father and son lost contact. In 1848 Charles Twisleton attempted to claim the Barony of Saye and Sele, but his claim was rejected by Doctor's Commons, the elderly John Stein having been located and admitting paternity.
