= John Twisleton-Wykeham-Fiennes, 17th Baron Saye and Sele =

English cricketer

The Right Honourable The Lord Saye and Sele JP DL
Personal information
- Full name: John Fiennes Twisleton Wykeham Fiennes
- Born: 28 February 1830; Adlestrop, Gloucestershire, England
- Died: 8 October 1907 (aged 77); Broughton, Oxfordshire, England
- Batting: Unknown

Domestic team information
- Years: Team
- 1850–1852: Marylebone Cricket Club

Career statistics
Competition	First-class
Matches	5
Runs scored	33
Batting average	4.71
100s/50s	–/–
Top score	11*
Catches/stumpings	–/–
- Source: Cricinfo, 14 September 2020

John Twisleton-Wykeham-Fiennes, 17th Baron Saye and Sele JP DL (28 February 1830 – 8 October 1907) was an English peer and first-class cricketer.

== Biography ==
The son of Frederick Fiennes, he was born in February 1830 at Adlestrop, Gloucestershire. He was educated at Harrow School, before matriculating at Christ Church, Oxford in 1849. He later played first-class cricket for the Marylebone Cricket Club from 1850 to 1852, making five appearances. Fiennes scored 33 runs in his five matches, with a high score of 11 not out.

In June 1852, he was appointed a deputy lieutenant for Oxfordshire. Fiennes also served in the army with the Queen's Own Oxfordshire Hussars, enlisting in 1852 as a cornet. He was promoted to lieutenant in April 1858 and captain in April 1860. He succeeded his father as 17th Baron Saye and Sele upon his death in May 1887. Fiennes was later present at the Coronation of Edward VII at Westminster Abbey in 1902. Among the offices was a county alderman and justice of the peace for Oxfordshire, in addition to being a justice of the peace for Warwickshire, Middlesex and Westminster. Fiennes died in October 1907 at Broughton, Oxfordshire. He was succeeded as Baron Saye and Sele by his son, Geoffrey Twisleton-Wykeham-Fiennes.

Peerage of England
Preceded by Frederick Twisleton-Wykeham-Fiennes	Baron Saye and Sele; 1887–1907	Succeeded by Geoffrey Twisleton-Wykeham-Fiennes
