= Richard Fiennes =

Richard Fiennes may refer to:

- Richard Fiennes, 7th Baron Dacre (1415–1483), English knight
- Richard Fiennes, 6th Baron Saye and Sele (1520–1573), MP for Oxfordshire (UK Parliament constituency), 1547
- Richard Fiennes, 7th Baron Saye and Sele (1555–1613), MP for Oxfordshire, Banbury and Whitchurch, 1584–1586
- Richard Fiennes, see Lundy#Civil war
