= Nathaniel Fiennes, 21st Baron Saye and Sele =

English peer, businessman and British Army officer (1920–2024)

The Right Honourable The Lord Saye and Sele DL

Personal details
- Born: Nathaniel Thomas Allen Twisleton-Wykeham-Fiennes; 22 September 1920
- Died: 20 January 2024 (aged 103)
- Spouse: Mariette Salisbury-Jones (m. 1958)
- Children: 5, including Susannah and William
- Parent: Ivo Twisleton-Wykeham-Fiennes, 20th Baron Saye and Sele (father)
- Education: Eton College
- Alma mater: New College, Oxford
- Military career
- Allegiance: United Kingdom
- Branch: British Army
- Service years: 1941–1950
- Rank: Major
- Unit: Rifle Brigade
- Conflicts: Second World War; Palestine Emergency
- Awards: Mentioned in despatches (2)

Nathaniel Thomas Allen Fiennes, 21st Baron Saye and Sele, DL (né Twisleton-Wykeham-Fiennes; 22 September 1920 – 20 January 2024), styled as Lord Saye and Sele, was an English peer, businessman, chartered surveyor and army officer.

== Early life and education ==
Twisleton-Wykeham-Fiennes was born on 22 September 1920, the son of Ivo Murray Twisleton-Wykeham-Fiennes, 20th Baron Saye and Sele, and Hersey Cecilia Hester Butler. Despite a family connection with Winchester College, he was educated at Eton and then at New College, Oxford. While still a student at Eton, he played cricket at minor counties level for Oxfordshire, making a single appearance in the 1938 Minor Counties Championship against Cornwall. Whilst studying at Oxford, Fiennes did not play first-class cricket for Oxford University Cricket Club, given the suspension of first-class cricket during the Second World War.

== Army career ==
During the Second World War Fiennes served in the Rifle Brigade (Prince Consort's Own). He received an emergency commission in the Rifle Brigade on 19 April 1941, and was promoted war-substantive lieutenant on 1 October 1942 and temporary captain on 3 September 1943. In March 1945 he was mentioned in despatches for service in North-West Europe.

In April 1945 Fiennes and his regiment, the 8th Battalion of the Rifle Brigade, were among the first troops to reach Bergen-Belsen concentration camp. In 2020 he recalled for the Daily Telegraph: "We turned down a small track, and it opened into a sight you would never want to see again ... People being chopped up, people on the ground, pits with three or four hundred dead bodies in each ... It was like something from a nightmare, and the smell was overpowering." He met with Bergen-Belsen survivor Mala Tribich (originally from Piotrków Trybunalski, Poland) at his family seat, Broughton Castle, shortly before the 75th anniversary of the liberation of the camp, and was ready "to grovel before [Tribich], because I have such a respect and admiration for her. She is the most remarkable lady ... all these survivors are." Tribich, who was 14 and ill with typhus when Bergen-Belsen was liberated, had previously survived the ghetto in her hometown and Ravensbrück concentration camp.

After the war, Fiennes remained in the army, receiving promotion to war-substantive captain and temporary major on 15 January 1946. On 22 May 1948 he received a regular commission as a lieutenant in the Rifle Brigade (seniority from 22 May 1943), with promotion to captain effective from the same date (seniority from 22 November 1947). He was stationed in Palestine during the Palestine Emergency in 1946–1947, for which he was again mentioned in despatches in January 1949. He resigned his commission on 8 February 1950, leaving with the honorary rank of major.

== Later work ==
Fiennes was a trustee of the Ernest Cook Trust, which works for the preservation of English country houses and estates, from 1959 until 1995, serving as chairman from 1964 until 1990. He was also a Fellow of Winchester College from 1967 to 1983, and president of the Banbury Historical Society from 1958 until his death.

He became a chartered surveyor and was a partner in the company Laws and Fiennes before becoming a regional director within Lloyds Bank from 1983 to 1990.

In 1979 Fiennes was appointed Deputy Lieutenant (DL) of Oxfordshire.

== Family ==
In 1958 Fiennes married Mariette Helena Salisbury-Jones (1935–2026), daughter of Major-General Sir Arthur Guy Salisbury-Jones, and had five children:

- Hon. Richard Ingel Fiennes (born 19 August 1959, died 13 April 2001)
- Martin Guy Fiennes, 22nd Baron Saye and Sele (b. 27 February 1961)
- Hon. Susannah Hersey Fiennes (b. 27 February 1961)
- Hon. Thomas Nathaniel Fiennes (11 October 1965 − 3 September 1968)
- Hon. William John Fiennes (b. 7 August 1970)

In 1965 he changed his surname by deed poll to Fiennes thereby relinquishing the surnames Twisleton and Wykeham.

Fiennes's brother Ingelram was killed on 30 August 1941 when his Wellington bomber was shot down, and his other brother, Oliver, was a clergyman who served as Dean of Lincoln from 1969 to 1989.

When his father died on 21 October 1968, Fiennes succeeded him as 21st Baron Saye and Sele. He died on 20 January 2024, at the age of 103.

== Links and sources ==
- RootsWeb
- RootsWeb
- Fiennes Times
- Val Bourne, 'Broughton Castle: a garden for poets – and film stars', The Daily Telegraph, 22 May 1999
- Debrett's People of Today (12th edn, London, 1999), p. 1739
- Portraits of Nathaniel Fiennes, 21st Baron Saye and Sele at the National Portrait Gallery, London

Peerage of England
Preceded by Ivo Twisleton-Wykeham-Fiennes	Baron Saye and Sele; 1968–2024	Succeeded by Martin Fiennes
