= Gerry Fiennes =

British railway manager and businessman

Gerry Fiennes

Gerard Francis Gisborne Twisleton-Wykeham-Fiennes OBE, MA (Note: This British person has the barrelled surname Twisleton-Wykeham-Fiennes, but is known by the surname Fiennes.) (7 June 1906 – 25 May 1985) was a British railway manager who rose through the ranks of the London and North Eastern Railway and later British Rail following graduation from the University of Oxford. British Rail fired him in 1967 for publishing an outspoken and critical book, I Tried to Run a Railway.

== Early life and family ==
He was educated at Winchester College and Hertford College, Oxford and then joined the London and North Eastern Railway as a Traffic Apprentice in 1928.

A grandson of Wingfield Fiennes, He was related to the actors Ralph and Joseph Fiennes, and the explorer Sir Ranulph Fiennes.

== Railway career ==
After his apprenticeship his subsequent appointments included:

- Assistant Yardmaster, Whitemoor Yard, Cambridgeshire, 1932
- Chief Controller, Cambridge, 1934.
- Various appointments at York, London Liverpool Street station, Edinburgh, and Shenfield.
- De facto District Operating Superintendent, Cambridge, during the early wartime.
- District Operating Superintendent, Nottingham, 1943.
- District Operating Superintendent, Stratford, east London, 1944.
- Operating Superintendent, Eastern Region, British Rail, 1956–57.
- Line Traffic Manager, London King's Cross station, 1957–61.
- Chief Operating Officer, British Railways Board, 1961–63.
- Chairman of the Western Region Board and General Manager, Western Region BR, 1963–65.
- Chairman of the Eastern Region Board and General Manager, Eastern Region, BR, 1965–67.

Starting in 1930 as a Traffic Apprentice, Fiennes gained a broad yet deep understanding of railway operations and economics. Fiennes' principles were that "the railway is judged by the comfort, speed, convenience, safety, punctuality and economy of its services". Consequently, he was prepared to discontinue services which could not be made to cover their costs and believed that unprofitable lines should be kept open only if there was a political will to underwrite the losses. On the other hand, Fiennes believed strongly in growing traffic and using resources intensively through aggressive scheduling and that, in order to compete with air and road, the average end-to-end speed of passenger trains had to be at least 75 miles per hour (120 km/h). Such speeds required much higher power locomotives than British Railways was ordering in large numbers at the time. As Line Traffic Manager of the East Coast Main Line in the late 1950s he was largely responsible for pushing for the purchase by BR of the 22 English Electric/ Napier "Deltic" locomotives in 1959 (in service 1961–82). These were deemed necessary as they were capable of prolonged running at 100 miles per hour (160 km/h), in order to provide the non-electrified East Coast route with a level of service comparable with that of the electrified West Coast Main Line.

As Chief Operating Officer at the British Railways Board at a time when a fleet of 100,000 freight wagons managed an average of just 20 journeys per year, he devised the "Merry-go-Round" (MGR) concept for continuous operation of coal and ore trains with loading and unloading on the move but was unable to overcome procrastination by his superiors and by the National Coal Board (which would have to invest in modern loading facilities) for several years. When finally introduced, MGR brought about drastic increases in efficiency and reductions in cost of bulk transport by rail. In one case, a proposed investment in 550 conventional wagons of 24.5 tonnes' capacity was replaced with 44 MGR wagons of 32.5 tonnes' capacity.

By the end of 1965, Fiennes was General Manager of the Western Region of British Railways. At the start of 1966, he was transferred to the same post on the Eastern Region, where he was to oversee the amalgamation of that Region with the North Eastern Region. This amalgamation had been approved in principle in December 1965 (not being formally approved until November 1966), and took effect on 1 January 1967.

On the Eastern Region in the mid-1960s he demonstrated that large savings could be made on unprofitable lines by use of the idea of a basic railway with less costly infrastructure, using track singling, unstaffed stations with larger car parks and fares collected on the trains.

He was dismissed from British Rail in 1967 for publishing the autobiographical book I Tried to Run a Railway, which was outspoken about the management of British Rail and government policy changes and particularly critical of the frequent management re-organisations that the railways had gone through since nationalisation.

== Later life ==
Following his main railway career, Fiennes was a director of Hargreaves Group between 1968 and 1976. He was a director of the railway publishers Ian Allan Ltd, who had published his book, and for whose rail industry magazines he had previously written extensively. He served as Mayor of Aldeburgh, Suffolk, in 1976. Fiennes continued his association with railways by accepting an invitation to join the board of directors of the independent, narrow gauge, Ffestiniog Railway Company, in north Wales, on which he served between 1968 and 1974. Between 1970 and 1974 he was the company's nominee to the Board of Directors of the Ffestiniog Railway Society, the voluntary supporters' organisation.

== Bibliography ==
- G F Fiennes (1967). I tried to run a Railway (First ed.). London: Ian Allan Ltd.
- G F Fiennes (1973). I tried to run a Railway (Revised ed.). London: Ian Allan Ltd. ISBN 9780711004474.
- Fiennes, Gerard (1986). Fiennes on Rails: Fifty years of Railways. Newton Abbot, Devon: David & Charles. p. 7. ISBN 0-7153-8926-2.
