= William Fiennes (author) =

English author (born 1970)

The Honourable William Fiennes
- Born: William John Fiennes; 7 August 1970 (age 56); Oxfordshire, England
- Education: Eton College; Oxford University
- Occupation: Author
- Parent(s): Nathaniel Fiennes, 21st Baron Saye and Sele; Mariette Salisbury-Jones
- Relatives: Susannah Fiennes (sister); Martin Fiennes, 22nd Baron Saye and Sele (brother)
- Writing career
- Genre: Memoir
- Notable works: The Snow Geese; The Music Room
- Notable awards: 2003 Hawthornden Prize
- Website: William Fiennes

William John Fiennes FRSL (born 7 August 1970) is an English author best known for his memoirs The Snow Geese (2002) and The Music Room (2009).

== Early life and education ==
Fiennes was born into the aristocratic Twisleton-Wykeham-Fiennes family and raised in 14th-century Broughton Castle in Oxfordshire, the youngest of five children of Nathaniel Fiennes, 21st Baron Saye and Sele (1920−2024) and Mariette Salisbury-Jones (1935 - 2026). The artist Susannah Fiennes and the 22nd Baron Saye and Sele are his twin siblings, and his maternal grandfather was the soldier and courtier Guy Salisbury-Jones. One of William's brothers died in a road accident at the age of three, before William was born, and another brother, Richard, developed epilepsy, which caused aggression and mood swings (and eventually his death at the age of 41).

Fiennes was educated at the Dragon School in Oxford, Eton College, and Oxford University, where he received both undergraduate and graduate degrees.

== Writing ==
Fiennes' first book, The Snow Geese (2002), is his account of how he followed snow geese from Texas to their summer breeding grounds on Baffin Island, and a meditation on the idea of home. Mark Cocker reviewed it for The Guardian, writing: "The Snow Geese is the debut of a striking talent". It was shortlisted for the 2002 Samuel Johnson Prize and won the 2003 Hawthornden Prize, the 2003 Somerset Maugham Award and the 2003 Sunday Times Young Writer of the Year Award.

His second book, The Music Room (2009), is his memoir of growing up in an English castle with an elder brother, Richard, who suffered from severe epilepsy which caused mood swings and intermittent aggression, but who could also be very loving and creative. The Music Room was called "a small masterpiece, a tribute to the power of place, family and memory" by Nicholas Shakespeare, who reviewed it for the Telegraph. It was shortlisted for the Costa Book Awards, the Duff Cooper Prize, the Ondaatje Prize, the PEN/Ackerley Prize and the Independent Booksellers' Book of the Year Award.

Fiennes has also written for Granta, the London Review of Books, The Observer, the Daily Telegraph and The Times Literary Supplement.

In 2011, Fiennes contributed a short fable, "Why the Ash has Black Buds", to an anthology titled Why Willows Weep. Sales from the book raised funds for The Woodland Trust and its mission to plant native trees throughout Great Britain.

In 2018, he contributed a chapter to the book Beneath the Skin: Great Writers on the Body (Profile Books). The chapter is about two years in his early 20s when the chronic illness Crohn's disease forced him to live with part of his intestines protruding outside of his abdominal cavity through a surgical incision. First diagnosed at the age of nineteen, he has undergone several surgeries and hospitalisations over the years and in 2009, he called his struggle with Crohn's "exhausting and demoralising".

== Other work ==
Fiennes spent two years as Fellow in the Creative Arts at Wolfson College, Oxford and in 2007, he was named Writer-in-Residence at the American School in London and at Cranford Community College, Hounslow. Since 2011, he has taught Creative Writing at Newcastle University.

== Personal life ==
William Fiennes is a second cousin of the explorer Sir Ranulph Fiennes and a distant relative of the travel writer Celia Fiennes (1662–1741). He is a third cousin of the actors Ralph Fiennes and Joseph Fiennes.

He plays cricket as a member of the Authors XI team of British writers and contributed a chapter, "Cricket and Memory" (which concludes with him breaking his collarbone while diving to make a catch), to the team's 2013 book about their first year together, The Authors XI: A Season of English Cricket from Hackney to Hambledon. Team captain Charlie Campbell describes Fiennes in the book as "the best fielder in the side and the most stylish batsman", while teammate Jon Hotten calls him "undoubtedly the nicest man in cricket".

In 2007, Fiennes co-founded the charity First Story, which brings acclaimed authors to secondary schools in low-income communities, where they run writing workshops for students to foster creativity.

He was named a Fellow of the Royal Society of Literature in 2009.
