= William Fiennes =

William Fiennes may refer to:

- William Fiennes (author) (born 1970)
- William Fiennes, 1st Viscount Saye and Sele (1582–1662)
- William Fiennes, 3rd Viscount Saye and Sele (c. 1641 – 1698)
