= Horsmans Place =

Estate in Dartford, Kent, England

Horsmans Place (Note: Also spelt Horsman's Place) was an estate and an early Elizabethan mansion situated in Dartford, Kent, England.

Thomas Horsman, the estate's namesake, inherited the mansion by marriage in 1420.

== Description ==
The Elizabethan mansion was built on the site of an existing building by John Bere in 1551. After the estate had been sold off in small lots and the mansion had suffered years of neglect, it was demolished and replaced by a smaller house in the late 18th century.

The principal front of the mansion faced the west, and was originally approached by an avenue of lime trees from Short-Hill, near the Spital-house. Some of the tree stumps remained until the 1780s. A long gallery ran along the whole front of the mansion, into which the several apartments opened. A large court in front of the mansion nearly extended across the present street, rendering the road narrow and inconvenient; but on rebuilding the house, James Storey set back his walls in a line with the rest of the street. Hasted says on the gateway, entering the court, were the initials of the founder, J. B. [John Bere] and the date 1551.

At the time it was demolished a record of this family appeared on an oaken beam, to the following effect, "soli deo honor et gloria Jhon Beer, in the yer of our Loyd mcccccxxxviii. (Note: mcccccxxxviii is an unusual way to write 1538; it is more usually written mdxxxviii.) On the pulling down of the gate-house, a part of the materials, with some of the letters of the inscription, were purchased by an inhabitant of Horton Kirby, and affixed on the walls of his house, where they were still to be seen in 1844.

== Ownership ==
In the reign of Edward II (1307–1327), the manor was owned by Thomas de Luda. Towards the end of the reign of Edward III (1327–1377) it had passed to John Horsman, and it is likely that he built a large new dwelling. It is after this building that the manor gained its name.

Tomas Horsman, John Horsman's son and heir, died without children at the beginning of the reign of Henry VI. So, he willed the estate to his widow Margaret. She remarried to a Mr. Shardlow, and upon her death c. 1640 bequeathed it to her kinsman Thomas Brown, whose daughter and sole heir Katherine, annexed it to the patrimony of Robert Blague, one of the Barons of the Exchequer. They had a son Barnaby Blague who inherited the estate and sold it to John Bere in 1541.

In 1551, John Bere rebuilt the mansion and gatehouse, and on the latter inscribed his initials, and the time of its erection. He married twice. His first wife was Alice, daughter and heir of William Nysell, of Wrotham; his second wife was Joan, or Johanna Egglefield, by whom he left two sons and two daughters. His eldest son Henry inherited Horsmans Place but died two years later, and the estate passed to his brother Nicholas. Edward Bere, his younger son and last remaining descendant, died leaving the estate to John Twisleton, a grandson and direct descendant of Alice, Edward's aunt. John Twisleton was created a baronet by Lord Protector Oliver Cromwell in 1658, but that baronetcy passed into oblivion at the restoration.

John Twisleton had four wives. By his third wife, Elizabeth (died 1762), eldest daughter and co-heir of James, Viscount Saye and Sele, he left an only daughter, first the wife of George Twisleton, of Wormesly in Yorkshire, and secondly of Robert Mignon. John Twisleton died in 1682, having bequeathed the manor and seat to his nephew, John, eldest son of his younger brother Philip (during the English Civil War a Roundhead colonel).

This John (died 28 July 1721) usually resided at Horsmans Place, and throughout his long life appears to have taken much interest in the welfare of Dartford. The estate passed to his nephew John Twisleton (died in 1757 without issue). There was a court case between two relatives of the last deceased owner, Thomas Cockshutt and John Twisleton (died 1763) over possession of Horsmans Place. The case was tried at Maidstone, in 1758, and John Twisleton was adjudged to be entitled to the estate in Dartford. (Note: John Twisleton (died 1657), appears to have been the last of that family inhabiting Horsmans Place; and in the litigation which followed between the claimants, it is not improbable that it stood empty for several years.)

John Twisleton died leaving three sons, the eldest of whom was killed in Germany the same year. His brothers became entitled to their father’s estates, as heirs in gavelkind. On a partition of the estates, Horsmans Place fell to the share of the second son, Thomas, a colonel in the guards, afterwards Lord Saye and Sele. Thomas sold Horsmans Place in 1768 with the rest of the estates in Dartford, to Thomas Williams and Thomas Smith.

The property comprised a great number of houses and a considerable portion of the lands in Dartford. Williams and Smith broke up the holding and sold it in separate portions at a great profit. They sold the mansion to Richard Leigh (died 1772), serjeant-at-law, upon whose death the house was inherited by his son Richard. (Note: After the court case to decide ownership the house was let to Prosper Brown, who resided there. His daughter Elizabeth, married Serjeant Leigh. Prosper Brown died 20 September 1739, aged 56; his widow subsequently married George Breton, brother of Sir William Breton, Keeper of the Privy Purse (1763–1773) for George II, formerly an officer in his majesty’s army, and resident here in 1769. Mr. Breton died in 1780, and she vacated Horsmans Place the same year. Mrs. Breton survived until 28 February 1785, and was buried in the abbey church, Bath.)

Richard Leigh the younger waited until his mother vacated the premises in 1780, and then while it was advertised to be sold, let the unoccupied mansion fall into a dilapidated state. It was rented in 1784 by James Storey, originally an artillery driver, who came to Dartford while the camp existed on Dartford Heath. Being a very industrious man, he was employed and patronised by several gentlemen in the town and commenced a market garden business in the garden opposite the mansion. He resided in the house for about a year before sub-letting it to the Rev. William Wiseman, master of the Grammar School. When Wiseman left, Storey moved back in, but finding the premises much too large and greatly dilapidated, he obtained Mr. Leigh's consent to replace the mansion with a house of smaller dimensions better adapted for his business. Eventually, James Story purchased the house and remaining land. (Note: Dunkin writing in 1844 refers to "Mr. James Story, the present proprietor", which is 60 years after James Storey initially rented the property.) (Note: With the estate, came the remaining contents of the house. James Story recounted that a long gallery ran along the whole front of the mansion, into which the several apartments opened; and that the walls of this gallery were hung with a vast number of portraits of the Bere and Twisleton families, which had been left there, when the house was sold to Mr. Leigh. That these pictures, greatly damaged by time, were considered valueless by Richard Leigh, and were given to him. James Story repeatedly offered them to picture dealers in London, without being able to find a purchaser. At last he obtained an offer of 40 shillings for the whole collection, which he refused, but after keeping them some time longer, found himself unable to obtain a higher price.)
