= Cecil Fiennes =

English cricketer and clergyman

Personal information
- Full name: Cecil Brownlow Twisleton Wykeham Fiennes
- Born: 20 August 1831; Adlestrop, Gloucestershire, England
- Died: 13 March 1870 (aged 38); Torquay, Devon, England
- Batting: Unknown
- Bowling: Unknown
- Relatives: Wingfield Fiennes (brother)

Domestic team information
- Years: Team
- 1856–1858: Marylebone Cricket Club

Career statistics
Competition	First-class
Matches	9
Runs scored	72
Batting average	4.80
100s/50s	–/–
Top score	12
Balls bowled	316
Wickets	7
Bowling average	21.42
5 wickets in innings	–
10 wickets in match	–
Best bowling	4/26
Catches/stumpings	2/–
- Source: Cricinfo, 15 August 2019

Cecil Brownlow Twisleton Wykeham Fiennes (20 August 1831 – 13 March 1870) was an English first-class cricketer and clergyman.

The son of Frederick Fiennes and his wife, Emily Wingfield, he was born in August 1831 at Adlestrop, Gloucestershire. He was educated at Winchester College, before matriculating at New College, Oxford in 1852, graduating B.A. and M.A. in 1859. He made his debut in first-class cricket for the Gentlemen of England against the Gentlemen of Kent and Surrey at Canterbury in 1855. He played first-class cricket until 1859, making six appearances for the Gentlemen of England and three appearances for the Marylebone Cricket Club. He scored 72 runs in his nine first-class appearances, in addition to taking 7 wickets with best figures of 4 for 26. After graduating from Oxford, he became an Anglican clergyman and was the rector of Hamstall Ridware in Staffordshire. He was the rector of Ashow in Warwickshire from 1866 until his death at Torquay in March 1870. His brother, Wingfield, was also a first-class cricketer.
