= Ivo Twisleton-Wykeham-Fiennes, 20th Baron Saye and Sele =

British peer and army officer

Ivo Murray Twisleton-Wykeham-Fiennes, 20th Baron Saye and Sele, OBE, MC (15 December 1885 – 21 October 1968) was a British peer and army officer.

== Biography ==
He was born to Geoffrey Twisleton-Wykeham-Fiennes, 18th Baron Saye and Sele. He educated at Harrow and the Royal Military Academy, Woolwich.

He served as an officer during the First World War and was mentioned in despatches. He gained the rank of lieutenant colonel in the Royal Artillery. For his service he was awarded the Military Cross (1918) and the French Croix de Guerre (1919). He also fought in the Second World War between 1939 and 1941.

He succeeded as the 14th Lord Saye and Sele [E., 1603], 20th Baron Saye and Sele on 18 February 1949 and appointed an Officer of the Order of the British Empire in 1961.

== Family ==
On 16 October 1919 Twisleton-Wykeham-Fiennes married Hersey Cecilia Hester Butler (1889−1968), daughter of Sir Thomas Dacres Butler, and had three sons:

- Nathaniel Thomas Allen Twisleton-Wykeham-Fiennes, 21st Baron Saye and Sele (1920−2024)
- Ingelram Ivo Twisleton-Wykeham-Fiennes (1922−1941)
- Oliver William Twisleton-Wykeham-Fiennes (1926−2011), Dean of Lincoln

== Notes ==
- Dod's Parliamentary Companion 1958, pp 213 & 214. See also other annual editions.
- Ivo Murray Twisleton-Wykeham-Fiennes, 20th Baron Saye and Sele's entry in Who's Who: https://doi.org/10.1093/ww/9780199540884.013.U54256

Peerage of England
Preceded by Geoffrey Twisleton-Wykeham-Fiennes	Baron Saye and Sele; 1949–1968	Succeeded by Nathaniel Twisleton-Wykeham-Fiennes
