= Oliver Fiennes =

British Anglican priest (1926–2011)

The Very Revd and Honourable Oliver Fiennes
- Dean of Lincoln
- Church: Church of England
- Diocese: Diocese of Lincoln
- In office: 1969 to 1989
- Predecessor: Michael Peck
- Successor: Brandon Jackson

Orders
- Ordination: 1954

Personal details
- Born: Oliver William Twisleton-Wykeham-Fiennes; 17 May 1926
- Died: 8 June 2011 (aged 85)
- Denomination: Anglicanism
- Education: Eton College; New College, Oxford

Oliver William Twisleton-Wykeham-Fiennes (Note: This British person has the barrelled surname Twisleton-Wykeham-Fiennes, but is known by the surname Fiennes.) (17 May 1926 – 8 June 2011) was Dean of Lincoln in the latter part of the 20th century.

== Early life and education ==
He was born on 17 May 1926 into a noble family, the youngest of three sons of Ivo Twisleton-Wykeham-Fiennes, 20th Baron Saye and Sele. He was educated at Eton College and won the Sword of Honour as best overall cadet at the Royal Military College, Sandhurst. He was commissioned into the Rifle Brigade on 1 September 1945 as a second lieutenant, but saw no fighting as the Second World War ended soon afterwards. He subsequently went up to New College, Oxford.

== Ordained ministry ==
Ordained in 1954, after a spell as a curate at St Mary Magdalene, New Milton, he became chaplain of Clifton College in 1958. Following this he was rector of Lambeth before his elevation to the deanery. Described by Trevor Beeson as “the last aristocrat to make his mark on the church", in retirement he lived near his old Cathedral in Lincoln until his death in June 2011.

== Notes ==
Church of England titles
Preceded by Michael David Saville Peck	Dean of Lincoln; 1969–1989	Succeeded by Brandon Donald Jackson
