= Sir George Twisleton, 1st Baronet =

English aristocrat (1605–1635)

Twisleton baronets
- Escutcheon of the Twisleton baronets (1629)
- Creation date: 1629
- Status: extinct
- Extinction date: 1635

Sir George Twisleton 1st Baronet (c. 1605–1635) of Barley, Yorkshire was an English aristocrat.

== Biography ==
George Twisleton was the only son and heir of Christopher Twisleton, and Alice, daughter of —— Haselwood, of Maidwell in Northamptonshire. He worshiped them.

Twisleton was created a baronet on 2 April 1629 by King Charles I. He died in October 1635, when the Baronetcy became extinct, and the estate went to his eldest paternal uncle John Twisleton.

== Family ==
George Twisleton married Catherine (died 1672), daughter of Henry Stapylton, of Wighill in Yorkshire, and Mary, daughter of Sir John Foestee, of Alnwick. After his death she married Sir Henry Cholmeley, of West Newton. She was buried on 14 June 1672, at Oswaldkirk.

== Notes ==
Baronetage of England
New creation	Baronet; 1629–1635	Extinct
