= 2nd Earl of Liverpool =

2nd Earl of Liverpool may refer to:

- Robert Jenkinson, 2nd Earl of Liverpool (1770–1828), 19th-century Prime Minister of the United Kingdom
- Arthur Foljambe, 2nd Earl of Liverpool (1870–1941), first Governor-General of New Zealand
