= Wingfield Fiennes =

English cricketer and clergyman

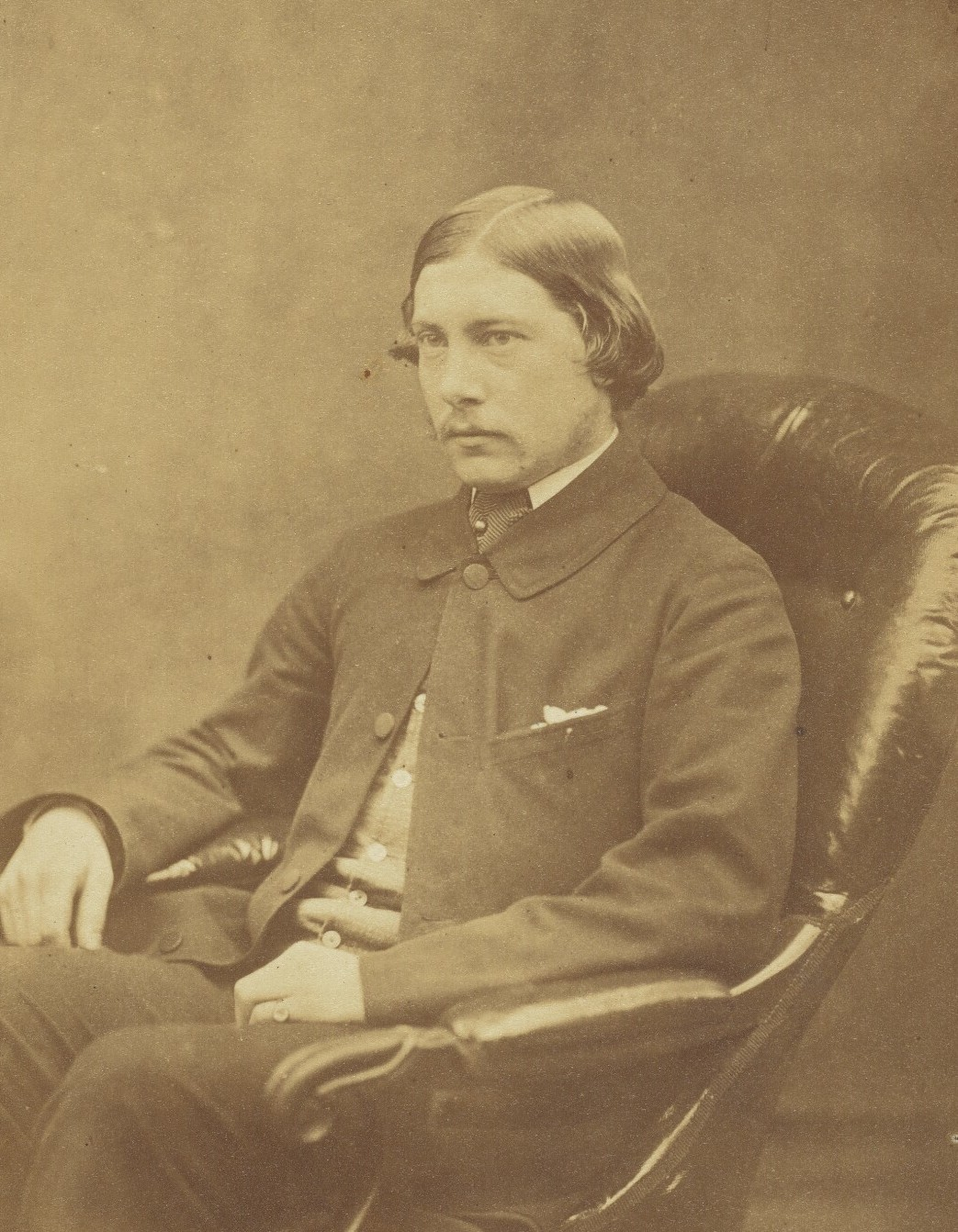
- Fiennes, c. 1850 – 1870

Personal information
- Full name: Wingfield Stratford Twisleton Wykeham Fiennes
- Born: 1 May 1834; Adlestrop, Gloucestershire, England
- Died: 10 October 1923 (aged 89); Banbury, Oxfordshire, England
- Batting: Unknown
- Bowling: Unknown
- Relatives: Cecil Fiennes (brother)

Domestic team information
- Years: Team
- 1856–1858: Oxford University

Career statistics
Competition	First-class
Matches	12
Runs scored	144
Batting average	7.57
100s/50s	–/–
Top score	30
Balls bowled	1,687
Wickets	67
Bowling average	11.62
5 wickets in innings	4
10 wickets in match	2
Best bowling	8/56
Catches/stumpings	9/–
- Source: Cricinfo, 16 August 2019

Wingfield Stratford Twisleton Wykeham Fiennes (1 May 1834 – 10 October 1923) was an English first-class cricketer and clergyman.

== Biography ==
The son of Frederick Fiennes, 16th Baron Saye and Sele and his wife, Hon. Emily Wingfield, he was born at Adlestrop, Gloucestershire. His maternal grandfather was Richard Wingfield, 4th Viscount Powerscourt.

He was educated at Winchester College, before going up to New College, Oxford. While studying at Oxford, he made his debut in first-class cricket for the Gentlemen of England against the Gentlemen of Kent and Surrey at Lord's in 1855, with Fiennes playing in that seasons return fixture at Canterbury. He debuted for Oxford University in 1856 against the Marylebone Cricket Club (MCC) and played in that seasons University Match against Cambridge at Lord's, in addition to playing twice for the Gentlemen of England. He played two matches each in 1857 and 1858 for Oxford, and made an appearance each for the Gentlemen of England in 1858 and 1859. Playing six first-class matches apiece for Oxford University and the Gentlemen of England, he took 41 wickets for Oxford at an average of 10.36, while for the Gentlemen he took 26 wickets at an average of 14.64. He took five wickets in an innings for each side twice, as well as taking ten wickets in a match twice for Oxford. His best innings figures were 8 for 56 for Oxford against the MCC in 1856.

Wingfield was a fellow at New College until 1864. He married Alice Susan Yorke in October 1863, with the couple having five children. After graduating from Oxford, he became an Anglican clergyman and was the perpetual curate of Wentworth in Yorkshire from 1863–65. He was the rector of Silchester in Hampshire from 1865–80, before becoming the rector of Milton Keynes in 1880. He died at Broughton Castle near Banbury in October 1923. His brother, Cecil, was also a first-class cricketer.
