= Thomas Twisleton =

English churchman

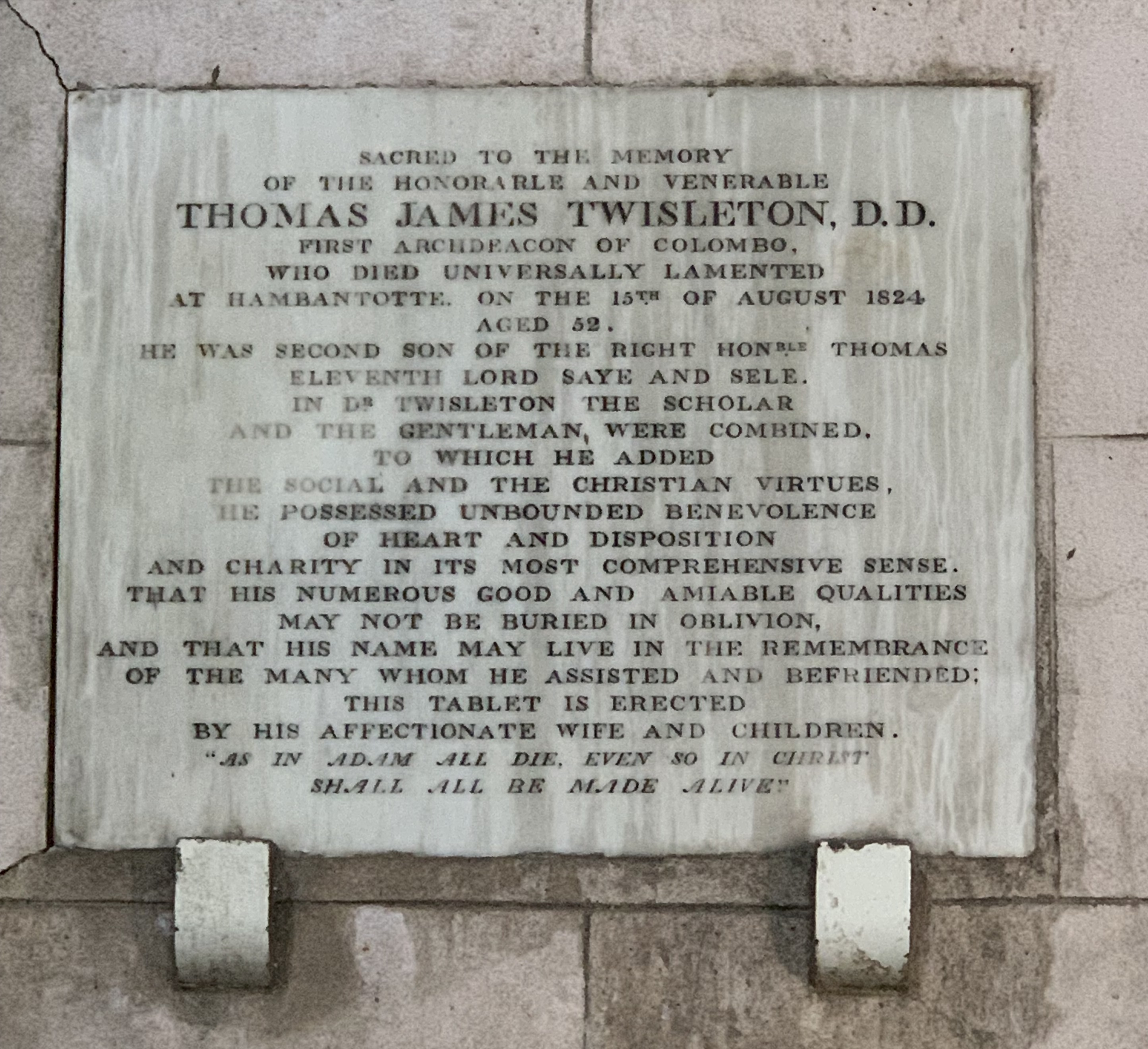

The Hon. Thomas James Twisleton (also Twistleton) (1770–1824) was an English churchman, Archdeacon of Colombo from 1815 to 1824. His early marriage is thought to have contributed to the use by Jane Austen of amateur theatricals as a plot device in her novel Mansfield Park. He was also noted as an amateur cricketer.

== Life ==
He was born on 28 September 1770 at Broughton, Oxfordshire, the youngest son of Thomas Twisleton, later Thomas Twisleton, 13th Baron Saye and Sele. He was educated at Westminster School, where he was a scholar, playing sports, and participated in The Trifler, a periodical, with John Hensleigh Allen and others. He matriculated at St Mary Hall, Oxford on 2 February 1789, aged 18, graduating B.A. in 1794, and M.A. 1796.

Twisleton was ordained in 1795, and became a curate at Charwelton. He was short of money, but was offered livings, appointed in 1796 to Blakesley by Susannah Wight of Blakesley Hall, which he had for the rest of his life; and later to Broadwell with Adlestrop, in the gift of Chandos Leigh, his nephew.

In 1802 Twisleton became secretary and chaplain to the British administration in Ceylon. He was appointed Archdeacon of Colombo in 1815, receiving the Oxford degree of D.D. in 1816. He died in Colombo, on 15 October 1824.

== Cricket career ==
Twisleton was mainly associated with Marylebone Cricket Club (MCC). He made appearances in four important matches, from 1789 to 1796.

== Family ==
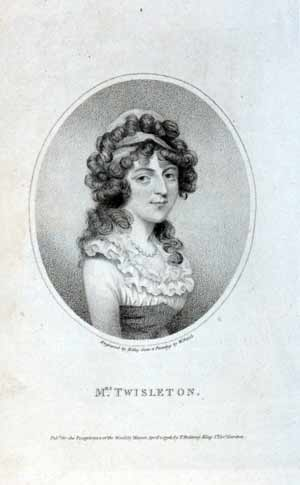
Charlotte Twisleton

Twisleton's first marriage was at age 18 or 19, the result of an elopement with the heiress Charlotte Anne Frances Wattrell. In May 1788, they had played together in an amateur performance, of Julia by Robert Jephson, at Freemasons' Hall, London, as Mentevole and Julia; and in September of that year ran away and were married in Scotland. Twisleton already had acting experience, in theatricals at Adlestrop House, and the couple performed together, there and elsewhere, for a year or so, attracting public attention. A son was born to Charlotte on 5 June 1790. Surviving issue of the marriage was the daughter Julia Eliza (1789–1832), who married Captain James Brown in 1808.

A change of heart by Twisleton about acting with his wife, in early 1794, precipitated a change of direction in his life, involving taking an Oxford degree, and preparing for the Church. He experienced money problems, they separated, and were divorced in 1798.

Twisleton's second wife, whom he married in 1798, was Anne Ashe (died 1847), daughter of Benjamin Ashe of the East India Company. Their children included:

- Frederick Fiennes, 16th Baron Saye and Sele
- Charles Samuel Twisleton (1806–1890), cleric, married Caroline Carr (1799–1873), daughter of Ralph Carr (1768–1837) and his wife Caroline Gregg, daughter of Francis Gregg MP.
- Edward Turner Boyd Twisleton, youngest son.
- Mary Elizabeth, married in 1818 William Gisborne, of the Ceylon Civil Service, third son of Thomas Gisborne and his wife Mary Babington.
