= Michael Peck (priest) =

Michael David Saville Peck (7 January 1914 – 22 April 1968) was Dean of Lincoln from 1965 to 1968.

Peck was born on 7 January 1914, educated at King's College School, Cambridge, Sedbergh and King's College, Cambridge and ordained in 1937. He was a Curate at Holy Cross, Greenford until 1946 and then Vice-Principal of St Chad's College, Durham until 1949. Later he was Vicar of St Mark's, Mansfield and then Archdeacon of Portsmouth before his elevation to the Deanery in 1965. He died in post on 22 April 1968.

== Notes ==
Church of England titles
Preceded by Edward James Keymer Roberts	Archdeacon of Portsmouth; 1956– 1964	Succeeded by Geoffrey Lewis Tiarks
Preceded by David Colin Dunlop	Dean of Lincoln; 1965 – 1968	Succeeded by Oliver William Twisleton-Wykeham-Fiennes
