= Banbury Castle =

- Banbury, Oxfordshire, England

Site information
- Type: Motte and bailey, later concentric pentagonal castle
- Condition: No remains

Location
- Shown within Oxfordshire
- Coordinates: 52.0628°N 1.3348°W
- Grid reference: grid reference SP457407

Site history
- Events: English Civil War

Banbury Castle was a medieval castle that stood near the centre of the town of Banbury, Oxfordshire. Historian John Kenyon notes that the castle is "remarkable for its early concentric shape".

== History ==
Banbury Castle was built in 1135 by Alexander, Bishop of Lincoln, in a motte and bailey design. The castle was later confiscated from Alexander by King Stephen in 1139, but was returned to the bishop later that year and mostly remained in the hands of later bishops until 1547. The castle was protected by a castle-guard drawn from estates around Banbury. The castle was strengthened between 1201–7 during the reign of King John.

The castle was subsequently completely rebuilt; earlier historians had concluded that the rebuilding occurred in the late 13th century, but archaeological excavations in the 1970s demonstrated that the work occurred between 1225–50. The new castle had a concentric pentagonal plan, with thick, embanked walls. The castle had a gatehouse, although later damage means that its design remains uncertain. Historian John Kenyon concludes that Banbury Castle is "remarkable for its early concentric shape", which is usually seen in somewhat later castles such as Harlech or Beaumaris. By the second half of the 13th century the castle was being used as a prison by the bishops of Lincoln.

The castle was bought by Edward Seymour, the Duke of Somerset, in 1547; it passed shortly afterwards to John Dudley, the Duke of Northumberland, who sold it to the Crown in 1551. Shortly after this the prison in the castle diminished in size, vanishing entirely by the 1560s. The prison was recreated in the 1580s, however, for holding recusants, that is to say Roman Catholics who refused to attend Church of England services as was required by law. In 1595 Banbury Castle was leased to Richard Fiennes, 7th Baron Saye and Sele.

When the First English Civil War began in August 1642, Banbury Castle was fortified by a Parliamentarian garrison under Richard Fiennes' son William. After the battle of Edgehill in October, the Royalist army marched south and forced the surrender of the castle and its stock of 1,500 firearms. The fortifications were strengthened and in 1644 the castle was besieged again, this time by Parliamentarian forces under the command of William Fiennes. The royal governor, 18-year-old William Compton, held out between July and October, when Compton's brother, James, relieved the siege. In November, Charles I dined in the castle. In January 1646 Sir Edward Whalley placed the castle under siege again with a force of 3,000 men; the Royalist cause was collapsing, and in May Compton and his force of 300 men surrendered.

After the war the castle itself was slighted, or deliberately demolished, in 1648 to prevent its further use; Fiennes was paid £2,000 by Parliament in compensation. Stones from the castle were later used to build houses in the town.

== Today ==
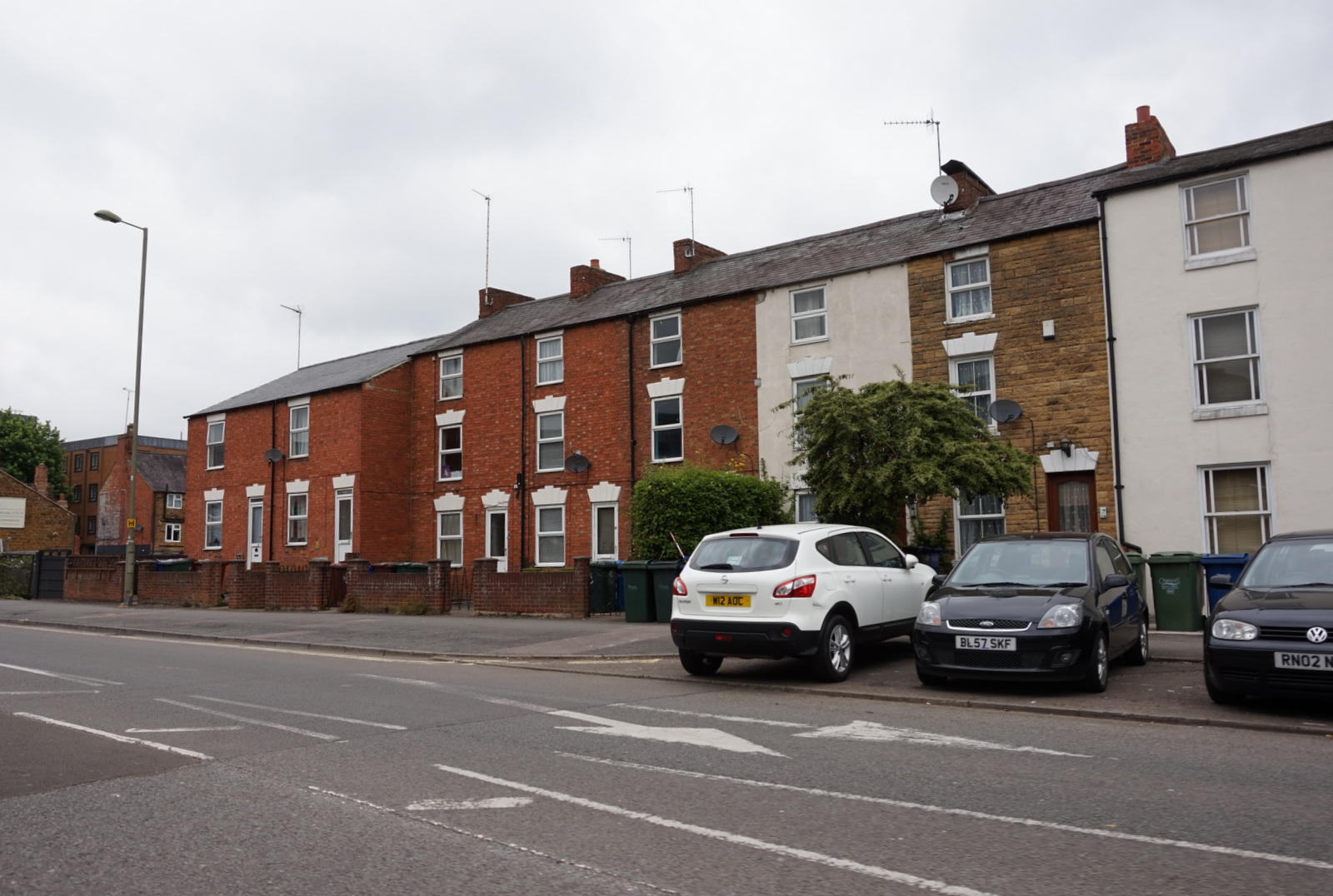
Castle Street in 2016

Nothing can now be seen of Banbury Castle, whose location is marked by Castle Street. The site was excavated in 1973–74.

== See also ==
- Castles in Great Britain and Ireland
- List of castles in England

== Bibliography ==
- Fasham, P. J. (1983). "Excavations in Banbury, 1972: second and final report". Oxoniensia 48. pp. 71–118.
- Fry, Plantagenet Somerset (1980). The David & Charles Book of Castles. Newton Abbot, UK: David and Charles. ISBN 0-7153-7976-3.
- Kenyon, John R. (1990). Medieval Fortifications. London: Continuum. ISBN 978-0-8264-7886-3.
- MacKenzie, James Dixon (1896/2009). The Castles of England: Their Story and Structure. General Books LLC. ISBN 978-1-150-51044-1.
