= Richard Fiennes, 7th Baron Saye and Sele =

English peer and diplomat (c. 1557–1613)

The Right Honourable The Lord Saye and Sele
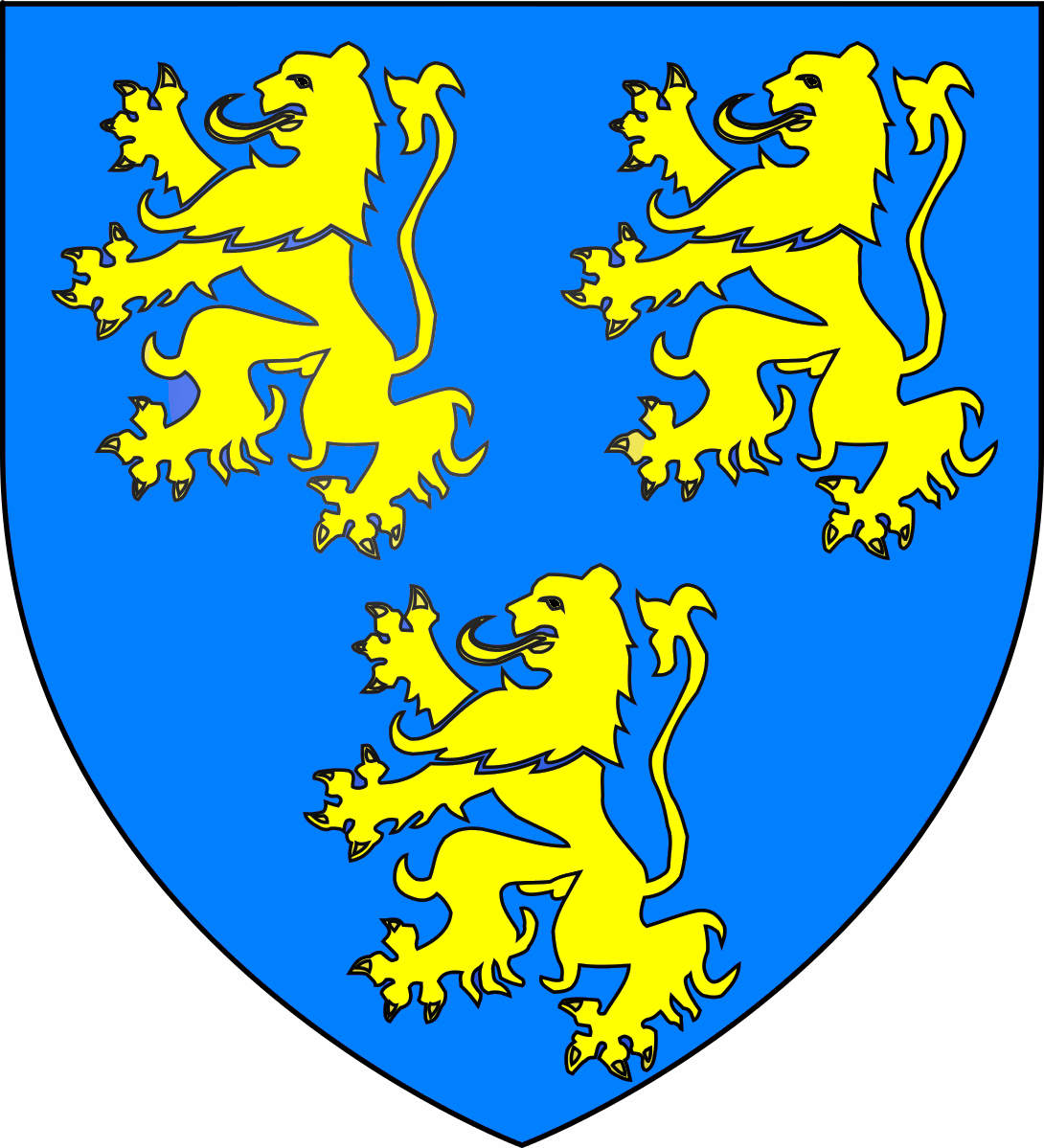
- Arms of Fiennes, Baron Saye and Sele: Azure, three lions rampant

Baron Saye and Sele
- In office c. 1603 – 6 February, 1613
- Preceded by: Richard Fiennes, de jure
- Succeeded by: William Fiennes

Personal details
- Born: c. 1557 Broughton Castle, Oxfordshire, England
- Died: 6 February, 1613 Broughton Castle, Oxfordshire, England
- Education: Winchester College

Richard Fiennes, 7th and 1st Baron Saye and Sele (c. 1557 – 6 February 1613) was an English peer and diplomat.

Fiennes was born at the family seat of Broughton Castle in Oxfordshire, the son of Richard Fiennes, de jure 6th Baron Saye and Sele and Ursula Fermor. Fiennes was admitted as Founder's Kin to Winchester College in 1569.

In 1590, he was charged by the Privy Council to keep sixteen recusants at Broughton. He was knighted by Elizabeth I in 1592 and served as High Sheriff of Oxfordshire in 1594. In 1596, he accompanied his cousin, Henry Clinton, 2nd Earl of Lincoln, on a diplomatic mission to the Landgrave of Hesse. Fiennes was made Keeper of Banbury Castle in 1603. He travelled with Edward Seymour, 1st Earl of Hertford to Brussels in 1605 on his embassy to Albert VII, Archduke of Austria.

Since his father's death in 1573, Fiennes had lobbied the Crown to be recognised as the Baron Saye and Sele, a title that had been dormant since the second baron's death in 1471. Upon the accession of James I, Lord Burghley petitioned the king to recognise Fiennes as the legitimate successor to his ancestor's barony. In 1603, James I issued letters patent confirming Fiennes and the heirs of his body as Baron Saye and Sele. However, because it was erroneously assumed that the barony of 1447 had been created by writ of summons, the succession was altered from that of heirs male to those of heirs general, thereby allowing the title to pass through daughters. Additionally, the 1603 patent effectively created a new title for Fiennes, and barred him from claiming the precedence and privilege of the 1447 creation. Despite the resulting loss of pride for the family, they yielded in order to secure the title.

He married (circa 1581) firstly Constance Kingsmill, the eldest daughter of Sir William Kingsmill of Sidmonton, north Hampshire, and secondly Elizabeth (died 1632) daughter of Henry Coddingham (Auditor of the Mint), and widow of William Paulet. He was succeeded by his eldest son, William, who was created Viscount Saye and Sele.

Peerage of England
Preceded by Richard Fiennes	Baron Saye and Sele; 1573–1613	Succeeded by William Fiennes
