= Edward Twisleton =

Edward Turner Boyd Twisleton
- Born: 24 May 1809; Ceylon
- Died: 5 October 1874 (aged 65); Boulogne, France
- Resting place: Broughton churchyard, Oxfordshire
- Occupation: Poor Law Commissioner 1845–1847

Edward Turner Boyd Twisleton (born 24 May 1809, Ceylon) was the son of Thomas Twisleton. He was educated at Winchester and he matriculated at Oriel College, Oxford in 1826. He became a scholar at Trinity College and graduated with a first class honours. He was called to the bar but did not practice, instead serving on government commissions. He was a British Poor Law Commissioner serving in Ireland between 1845 and 1847. He tackled his work assisting the relief effort with enthusiasm but argued with Charles Trevelyan and Charles Wood over taxes. He resigned his office because he objected to rate-in-aid legislation that he regarded as unfair to the north of Ireland, making them in effect pay for relief twice.

Twisleton died at Boulogne, France, on 5 October 1874 and is buried at Broughton churchyard in Oxfordshire.
