= Thomas Dacres Butler =

British Army officer (1845–1937)

Sir Thomas Butler
- Born: 3 October 1845
- Died: 29 December 1937 (aged 92)
- Military career
- Allegiance: United Kingdom
- Branch: British Army
- Rank: Captain
- Awards: Knight Commander of the Royal Victorian Order

Sir Thomas Dacres Butler KCVO JP (3 October 1845 – 29 December 1937) was a British Army officer and senior civil servant.

== Biography ==
Butler was born in Hambledon, Hampshire, the son of Colonel Thomas Butler and Arabella Dacres. He attended the Royal Military College, Sandhurst and commissioned into the 52nd (Oxfordshire) Regiment of Foot. He gained the rank of captain in 1873. He was admitted to the Middle Temple on 18 April 1882. Butler served as Secretary to the Lord Chamberlain in the Royal Household before becoming Yeoman-Usher of the Black Rod, the deputy of Black Rod, in 1892. He served in the House of Lords in this position until 1929, notably overseeing the installation of electric lighting to the House in 1904. He was invested as a Knight Commander of the Royal Victorian Order in 1918.

His philanthropic work included support to Royal Sussex County Hospital, St Thomas' Hospital and Paddington Green Children's Hospital. He was also a Vice President of the Royal College of Nursing.

Butler married Nina Helen Elliot, daughter of Admiral Sir George Elliot and Hersey Susan Sydney Wauchope, on 12 July 1877. Their second daughter, Hersey, married Ivo Murray Twisleton-Wykeham-Fiennes, 20th Baron Saye and Sele.
