= Frederick Fiennes, 16th Baron Saye and Sele =

British Archdeacon (1799–1887)

The Venerable Frederick Fiennes, 16th Baron Saye and Sele, MA (1799–1887) was Archdeacon of Hereford from 1863 to 1887.

== Life ==
Fiennes was born Frederick Benjamin Twisleton on 4 July 1799, a son of Thomas James Twisleton. He was educated at Winchester and New College, Oxford. He was ordained in 1823 and spent his whole career at Hereford Cathedral. He was appointed Prebendary in 1825; Treasurer in 1832 and Canon Residentiary in 1840.

He succeeded a cousin to the title of Baron Saye and Sele in 1847 and legally changed his surname to Twisleton-Wykeham-Fiennes in 1849, although the name is frequently shortened to Fiennes. As Baron Saye and Sele, he arranged restoration work on the family home of Broughton Castle but the house had to be let to tenants from 1885.

He died on 25 May 1887.

== Family ==
In 1827 Fiennes married Emily Wingfield, daughter of Richard Wingfield, 4th Viscount Powerscourt, and had the following children:

- Emily Wingfield Twisleton-Wykeham-Fiennes (1827–1917)
- John Twisleton-Wykeham-Fiennes, 17th Baron Saye and Sele (1830–1907)
- Cecil Brownlow Twisleton-Wykeham-Fiennes (1831–1870)
- Ivo de Vesci Edward Twisleton-Wykeham-Fiennes (1833–1875)
- Wingfield Stratford Twisleton-Wykeham-Fiennes (1834–1923)
- Frederic Nathaniel Fiennes Twisleton-Wykeham-Fiennes (1836–1896)
- Isabella Elizabeth Catherine Twisleton-Wykeham-Fiennes (1837–1915)

Emily died in 1837, and in 1857 Fiennes was married for a second time, to Caroline Eliza Leigh (1825–1909), daughter of Chandos Leigh, 1st Baron Leigh.

His descendants include the explorer Ranulph Fiennes and actors Ralph Fiennes, Joseph Fiennes and Hero Fiennes Tiffin.

== Notes ==
Church of England titles
Preceded by Richard Lane Freer	Archdeacon of Hereford; 1863–1887	Succeeded by Berkeley Lionel Scudamore Stanhope
