= Susannah Fiennes =

British artist

Susannah Hersey Fiennes (née Twisleton-Wykeham-Fiennes; born 27 February 1961) is a British artist who has worked extensively with King Charles III and is collected in Europe, Asia and America.

== Biography ==
Fiennes is the daughter of Nathaniel Fiennes, 21st Baron Saye and Sele (1920−2024), who changed the family's surname from Twisleton-Wykeham-Fiennes to Fiennes by deed poll in 1965, and Mariette Helena Salisbury-Jones (b. 1935), of Broughton Castle, Oxfordshire. She is the twin sister of the current Baron, Martin Fiennes, and a cousin of the actor Ralph Fiennes. She was educated at Marlborough College and then at the Slade School of Art where she graduated with First Class Honours in 1983.

From 1985 to 1987, she taught art and history of art at Dulwich College, London. Subsequently, she ran a private art class in Westminster, London, from 1987 to 1993. In 1994, she had a painting class at the National Portrait Gallery, London.

In 1995, she came to national attention when she was recommended by a friend to King Charles, who was at the time Prince of Wales. She became the tour artist with the King in Oman. In 1997 she was again chosen to tour with the King, on this occasion to Hong Kong to record the handing over of the territory to China. The King funded the tour and, in return, chose which paintings he wished to keep. She toured with him to Argentina, Uruguay and the Falkland Islands in 1999.

Between 1999 and 2004, she had a studio and home in New York. She currently has studios in Wales and Ireland and teaches at the Royal Drawing School in London.

She has written a series of articles on this for Prospect and The Daily Telegraph. She has also featured in Tatler.

== Exhibitions ==
=== Solo exhibitions ===
- Thomas Williams Fine Art Gallery, London: Making Music 2005
- Somoza-Sims Gallery, Houston, Texas 2000
- Grosvenor Gallery, London 1999
- Raphael Valls Gallery, London 1998
- National Portrait Gallery, London: Chinese Characters 1998
- Cadogan Contemporary Gallery, London 1992 and 1994

=== Group exhibitions ===
Group exhibitions include:

- The Forbes Gallery, 5th Ave, New York City 2000
- Hampton Court Palace, London. Travels with the Prince. 1998
- National Museum of Wales, Cardiff. Princes as Patrons. 1998
- Cadogan Contemporary, London 1990 and 1997
- The National Portrait Gallery, London. BP Portrait Exhibition 1989, 1991 and 1993

== Awards ==
- BP Travel Award (China) 1993
- British Institution Fund Award, Royal Academy (London) 1984
- Boise Travel Scholarship (Italy) 1983

== Collections ==
Her paintings are in several collections including:

- His Royal Highness The Prince of Wales
- The House of Commons, Westminster, London
- Hambros Bank, London, New York, Hong Kong
- The National Portrait Gallery, London
- Royal College of Psychiatrists, London.
- Barings Bank, London
