= Philip Twisleton =

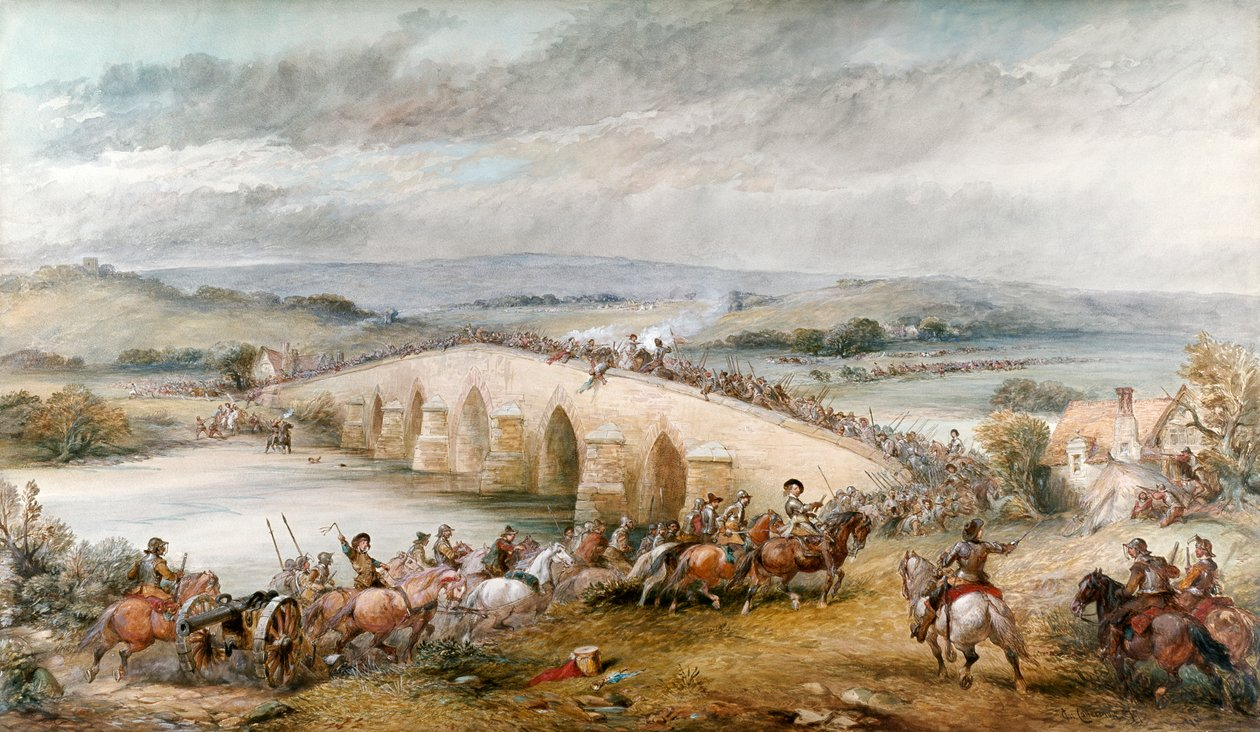
- 1877 painting of the fight for Preston Bridge, part of the Battle of Preston

Personal details
- Born: Uncertain, probably c. 1616 Drax, North Yorkshire
- Died: 13 June 1678 (aged 61) Horsmans Place, Kent
- Spouse: Ann Brograve
- Children: John (died 1721); Thomas

Military service
- Allegiance: Parliamentarian
- Years of service: 1642 to 1660
- Rank: Colonel
- Battles/wars: Wars of the Three Kingdoms; Battle of Gainsborough; Newark; Second Newbury; Battle of Melton Mowbray; Naseby; Winwick; Preston; Dunbar

Philip Twisleton, born c. 1616, died 13 June 1678, was a member of the landed gentry from Yorkshire, who served as a colonel in the New Model Army during the Wars of the Three Kingdoms.

== Biography ==
Philip Twisleton was the son of John Twislkton, of Drax and Barley, Yorkshire, and of Horsmans Place in Dartford, and Margaret, daughter of William Constable. He had an elder brother, John (1614–1682), and a younger, George (1618–1667), who also served in the Parliamentarian army.

Twisleton was colonel of a cavalry regiment in the New Model Army, and was knighted by Oliver Cromwell, the Lord Protector, on 1 February 1658. The knighthood was voided after the Stuart Restoration in May 1660.

== Family ==
Philip Twisleton married Ann, daughter of John Brograve (born 1597) of Hamells and Hannah, daughter of Sir Thomas Barnardiston. They had two sons:

- John (died 1721), the eldest son and heir, who inherited Horsmans Place from his uncle John and died childless.
- Thomas, who became a reverend and had at least one child, a daughter named Mary.

== Sources ==
- Burke, John (1838), A genealogical and heraldic history of the extinct and dormant baronetcies of England, by J. and ..., London: Scott, Webster and Grey, p. 82
- Cokayne, George Edward, ed. (1903), Complete Baronetage 1649–1664, vol. 3, Exeter: William Pollard and Co, p. 5
- Dunkin, John (1844), The History and Antiquities of Dartford, with Topographical Notices of the Neighbourhood, John Russell Smith, pp. 296
- Peile, John (1910), Venn, John Archiabald (ed.), Biographical register of Christ's College, 1505-1905, and of the earlier foundation, God's house, 1448-1505, vol. 2, Cambridge University Press, p. 163
- Shaw, William Arthur (1906), The Knights of England: A complete record from the earliest time to the present day of the knights of all the orders of chivalry in England, Scotland, and Ireland, and of knights bachelors, incorporating a complete list of knights bachelors dubbed in Ireland, vol. 2, London: Sherratt and Hughes
- Reid, Stuart (2004). Dunbar 1650: Cromwell's Most Famous Victory. Osprey Publishing. p. 40. ISBN 9781841767741.
