= Broughton, Oxfordshire =

Village in Oxfordshire, England

Coordinates: 52.042°N 1.388°W

Broughton
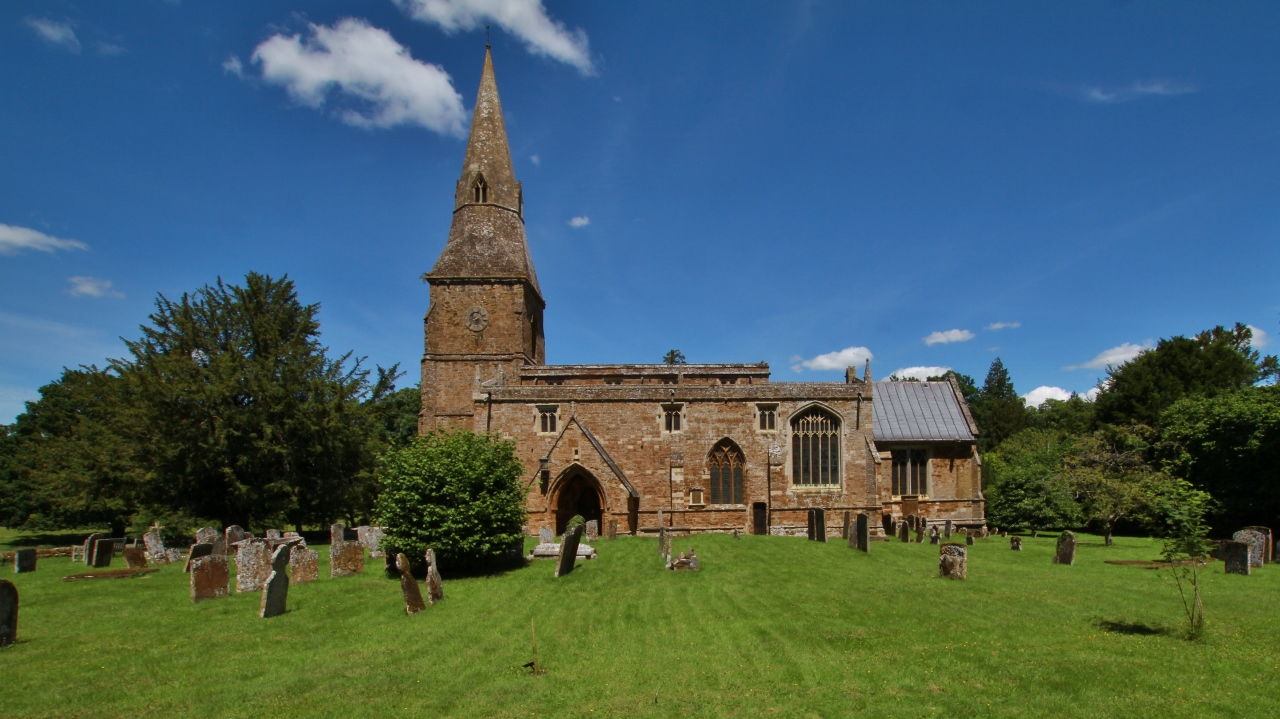
- St Mary the Virgin parish church

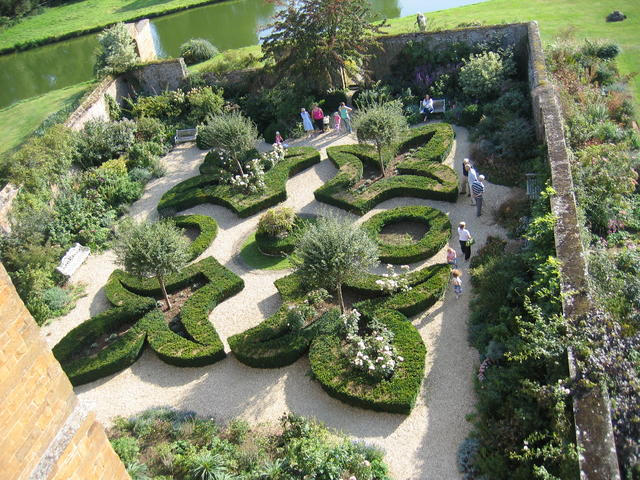
- Formal gardens at Broughton Castle

- Location within Oxfordshire
- Area: 3.94 km^{2} (1.52 sq mi)
- Population: 286 (2011 Census)
  - Density: 73/km^{2} (190/sq mi)
- OS grid reference: SP4238
- Civil parish: Broughton
- District: Cherwell
- Shire county: Oxfordshire
- Region: South East
- Country: England
- Sovereign state: United Kingdom
- Post town: Banbury
- Postcode district: OX15
- Dialling code: 01295
- Police: Thames Valley
- Fire: Oxfordshire
- Ambulance: South Central
- UK Parliament: Banbury

Broughton is a village and civil parish in northern Oxfordshire, England, about 2 1/2 miles (4 km) southwest of Banbury. The 2011 Census recorded the parish's population as 286.

== History ==
The Domesday Book of 1086 records the place-name as Brohtune and an episcopal register from 1224 records it as Broctona. The name is derived from Old English and in this case means tūn ("farm") on a brōc ("brook").

Before the Norman Conquest of 1066 Thorgautr Lagr held the manor of Broughton. By 1086 the parish of Broughton was part of the hundred of Bloxham, held by tenant-in-chief Berengarii de Todeni (Berengar de Tosny), eldest son of Robert de Todeni. Berengar's sister Albreda inherited Broughton, so her husband Robert de Insula was next to manage the profitable manor. The Domesday Book records that in 1086 Broughton parish had two watermills. By 1444 there were at least three, one of which was a fulling mill. By 1685 there was a second fulling mill, and both mills supplied the local woollen industry. Fulling and cloth-dyeing remained local industries until early in the 20th century.

Broughton Castle is a 14th- to 16th-century country house and the ancestral seat of the Lords Saye and Sele (the Fiennes family). It is a Scheduled Monument and Grade I listed building.

In the 17th century Broughton's agriculture was mostly pasture for cattle and sheep, which has given to the parish such field names as Dairy Ground, Grazing Ground and New Close Pasture. Improved crop rotation in the agricultural revolution increased arable farming in the parish, with crops being diversified in the 18th century to include clover, flax, hops, sainfoin and woad. Some of these crops have given place names to the parish such as Sandfine Wood, Sandfine Road and Woadmill Farm. Woad was still grown in 1827, when it was used locally for dyeing wool. Broughton has a pair of Gothic Revival almshouses that were built in 1859.

In 1911, Lady Ottoline Morrell and Philip Morrell moved into Broughton Grange. They stayed until 1915, when they moved to Garsington Manor.

== Parish church ==
The Church of England parish church of St Mary the Virgin is in the grounds of Broughton Castle. The church was built about 1300 in a style that is transitional from Early English to Decorated Gothic. Clerestories were added to the south aisle late in the 14th century and to the nave in the 15th century. The church was restored in 1877–80 under the direction of George Gilbert Scott. It is a Grade I listed building. Broughton Rectory was rebuilt in 1694. It was altered three times in the 19th century: firstly by Richard Pace of Lechlade in 1808, and then with extensions by SP Cockerell in 1820 and HJ Underwood in 1842.

The church has 19th-century stained glass by Lavers and Westlake, Kempe, Clayton and Bell, Burlison and Grylls as well as some Munich glass.ref name="listing"/>

== Amenities ==
Broughton has a pub, the Saye and Sele Arms.

== Sources ==
- Ekwall, Eilert (1960) [1936]. Concise Oxford Dictionary of English Place-Names (4th ed.). Oxford: Oxford University Press. Broughton. ISBN 0198691033.
- Lobel, Mary D; Crossley, Alan, eds. (1969). A History of the County of Oxford. Victoria County History. Vol. 9: Bloxham Hundred. London: Oxford University Press for the Institute of Historical Research. pp. 85–102. ISBN 978-0-19722-726-8.
- Sherwood, Jennifer; Pevsner, Nikolaus (1974). Oxfordshire. The Buildings of England. Harmondsworth: Penguin Books. pp. 490–492, 498. ISBN 0-14-071045-0.
