= Guy Salisbury-Jones =

British Army general

Major-General Sir Guy Salisbury-Jones GCVO CMG CBE MC
- Born: July 4, 1896; London, England
- Died: February 8, 1985 (aged 88); Hambledon, Hampshire, England
- Military career
- Allegiance: United Kingdom
- Branch: British Army
- Rank: Major-General
- Commands: 3rd Battalion, Coldstream Guards
- Conflicts: First World War; Second World War
- Awards: Knight Grand Cross of the Royal Victorian Order, Companion of the Order of St Michael and St George, Commander of the Order of the British Empire, Military Cross, Mentioned in Dispatches

Major-General Sir Arthur Guy Salisbury-Jones GCVO CMG CBE MC (4 July 1896 – 8 February 1985) was a British Army officer and the Marshal of the Diplomatic Corps in the Royal Households of George VI and Elizabeth II between 1950 and 1961.

== Early life and military career ==
Salisbury-Jones was the son of Arthur Thomas Salisbury-Jones. He was commissioned into the Coldstream Guards from the Royal Military College, Sandhurst on 22 December 1915. He saw action on the Western Front in the First World War with the Guards, and was Mentioned in Dispatches and awarded the Military Cross. He ended the war as a Major.

Salisbury-Jones served as the commanding officer of the 3rd Battalion, Coldstream Guards, in Palestine between 1938 and 1939. Following the outbreak of the Second World War he served with British forces in Egypt, before becoming Head of the British Military Mission to Greece in 1940. After the defeat of Allied forces there, he became Head of the Military Mission in South Africa and became Acting Brigadier. Between 1944 and 1945, Salisbury-Jones worked at the Supreme Headquarters Allied Expeditionary Force. He was invested as a commander of the Order of the British Empire in August 1945. After the war, he headed up the British Military Mission to France before ending his military career as military attaché in Paris from 1946 to 1949. From 1948 to 1949 he served as Aide-de-camp to King George VI. He worked in the Royal Household as Marshal of the Diplomatic Corps from 1950 to 1961.

== Wine making and retirement ==
When he retired he looked to combine his love of France with his home in Hambledon, Hampshire. As a result, in 1951 he planted an acre of vines (Seyval Blanc), which was later expanded and in 1954 produced the first crop. This was the first commercial vineyard in the UK for about twenty years and led to the now flourishing production of English wine. In the 1960s and 1970s 'Hambledon' became synonymous with English wine.

He was made a Knight Grand Cross of the Royal Victorian Order on 20 December 1961. He wrote the biography of the distinguished French general, Jean de Lattre de Tassigny.

== Family ==
He married Hilda Violet Helena de Bunsen, daughter of Sir Maurice de Bunsen, 1st Baronet on 10 November 1931. His sister in law was Mary de Bunsen, the Air Transport Auxiliary pilot. His daughter, Mariette Helena, married Nathaniel Fiennes, 21st Baron Saye and Sele. Salisbury-Jones died at Hambledon in 1985.
