= John Twisleton =

English nobleman

John Twisleton (c 1614–1682), of Horsmans Place, Dartford, Kent was created a baronet by the Lord Protector Oliver Cromwell. He was Sheriff of Kent.

== Biography ==
John Twisleton was born about 1614, the son and heir of John Twisleton, of Drax and Barley, Yorkshire, and of Horsmans Place in Dartford, and Margaret, daughter of William Constable. He was admitted to Gray's Inn on 3 August 1629.

The Lord Protector Oliver Cromwell created John Twisleton a baronet on 10 April 1658, (Note: "with remainder in default of issue male of his own 1660. body, to Sir Philip Twisleton, Knt., 2d brother of the said John, and his issue male, and, for default to George Twisleton, (Note: Presumably Col. George Twisleton, M.P. for Anglesey, 1654-55, 1656-58, and 1659) third brother of the said John Twisleton and his heirs male for ever". (Note: Banks's continuation to Dugdale's Catalogue. It seems probable that the words "his heirs male" are a mistake for "the heirs male of his body." The orig. patent is said [Pari. Hist., vol. xxi, p. 220] to be in the hands of his descendants at Rawcliffe, Yorkshire)) This dignity was disallowed after the Restoration in May 1660.

He was Sheriff of Kent for the year starting in 1671. He died on 4 December 1682, in his 69th year, and was buried (as "John Twisleton, Esq.") at Dartford. In the south chancel of Holy Trinity Church, Dartford, is a mural monument of white marble erected to his memory. (Note: On the monumenis the following inscription: Near this place lieth interred the body of John Twisleton, of Horsman's Place, in this Parish, Esq; son and heir of John Twisleton of Drax in the county of York, Esq. who was uncle and heir of Sir George Twisleton of Barley in the said county, Bart. the ancient and paternal seat of the family. This John had four wives: the first, Elizabeth, daughter and heir of Augustin Skinner of Tolshatn in this county, Esq; the second, Lucy, fifth daughter of Samuel Dunch, of Baddesley in the county of Berks, Esq; who also lyeth buried near this place; the third, Elisabeth, eldest daughter and coheir of the right honourable James, Viscount, and Baron Say and Seale, by whom he had issue two sons and a daughter, who died soon after they were born, and lye buried here, and also a daughter now living; his fourth wife was Anne, daughter and heir of John-Christopher Meyern, a German, which survived him. He departed this life, the 4th day of December, in the year of our Lord MDCLXXXII, in the LXIXTH year of his age. "Vir bonus, pius, & justus.")

== Family ==
John Twisleton was married four times:

- He married firstly (Lic. London 27 April 1636, he was 22 and she 19), Elizabeth, daughter and heir of Augustine Skinner, of Tolsham, or Tattsham Hall, Kent.
- He married secondly, Lucy, 5th daughter of Samuel Dunch, of Baddesley, Berkshire. She was buried at Dartford.
- He married thirdly (Lic. Fao. 12 May 1649, she was 18), Elizabeth (died 1674), eldest daughter and co-heir of James, Viscount Saye and Sele. She was buried at Bunhill fields. They had a daughter, Cecil, his only child, who married firstly George Twisleton, of Wormesly in Yorkshire, and secondly of Robert Mignon, and through whom the Baron Saye and Sele is descended.
- He married fourthly, Anne, daughter and hier of John Christopher Meyern, a German. After Twisleton death she married Sir John Platt.
