= Thomas Twisleton, 13th Baron Saye and Sele =

British Army officer

Major-General The Right Honourable The Lord Saye and Sele
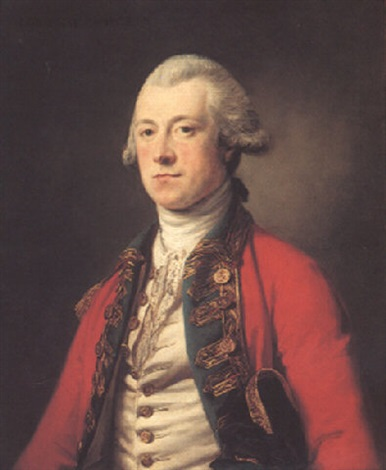
- Portrait by Francis Cotes
- Born: c. 1735
- Died: 1 July 1788
- Military career
- Allegiance: Great Britain
- Branch: British Army
- Rank: Major-General
- Commands: 9th Regiment of Foot
- Conflicts: Seven Years' War; American War of Independence

Major-General Thomas Twisleton, 13th Baron Saye and Sele (c. 1735 – 1 July 1788) was a British Army officer who served in the Seven Years' War and American War of Independence.

== Military career ==
Twisleton was the son of John Twistleton (died 1763) of Broughton Castle, Oxfordshire, and his wife Anne Gardner. He purchased a commission in the Scots Guards in 1754, becoming a captain in 1758.

Twisleton fought in the West German Campaign during the Seven Years' War, and was present at the Battle of Wilhelmsthal in 1762. He saw further active service in the American War of Independence and was promoted to colonel in 1777. In 1780, he oversaw the defence of the Bank of England during the Gordon Riots and was responsible for helping to restore order in London.

In 1781 Twisleton successfully established his claim to the Saye and Sele Barony, and assumed his seat in the House of Lords on 29 June that year. As Lord Saye and Sele, he became colonel of the 9th (East Norfolk) Regiment of Foot in 1782 and served in that position until his early death in 1788. He was promoted to major general in 1782.

== Family ==
Twisleton married in 1767 Elizabeth Turner, eldest daughter of Sir Edward Turner, 2nd Baronet and his wife Cassandra Leigh. Their children were:

- Gregory William
- Thomas James
- Julia Judith (died 1843), who married in 1786 James Henry Leigh MP.
- Mary Cassandra (died 1843), married firstly Edward Jervis Ricketts, and after that marriage was dissolved, Richard Charles Head Graves, son of Richard Graves.

Peerage of England
Preceded by Abeyant since 1674, dormant since 1715	Baron Saye and Sele; 1781–1788	Succeeded by Gregory Eardley-Twisleton-Fiennes
Military offices
Preceded by Edward Ligonier, 1st Earl Ligonier	Colonel of the 9th Regiment of Foot; 1788–1794	Succeeded by Alexander Leslie
