= Baron Saye and Sele =

Title in the Peerage of England

Barony of Saye and Sele
- Quarterly, 1st & 4th: Azure three lions rampant or (for Fiennes); 2nd & 3rd: Argent, a chevron between three moles sable (for Twisleton)
- Creation date: by 24 February 1447; 9 August 1603
- Peerage: Peerage of England
- First holder: James Fiennes
- Present holder: Martin Fiennes
- Heir apparent: Guy Fiennes
- Remainder to: 1st baron's heirs general
- Status: Extant
- Seat: Broughton Castle
- Motto: Fortem posce animum ("Put forward a stout heart")

Baron Saye and Sele is a title in the Peerage of England held by the Twisleton-Wykeham-Fiennes family. The title dates to 1447 but it was recreated in 1603. Confusion over the details of the 15th-century title has led to conflicting order for titleholders; authorities such as Burke's Peerage and Debrett's Peerage do not agree on whether or not the 1447 creation is still extant.

== History ==
The Saye (also spelt Say) family name is an ancient one. According to the Roman de Rou, a "le sire de Saye" took part in the Norman conquest in 1087, after which they gained prominence and land. The name Saye possibly refers to Sai, Normandy. In the 11th century, a William de Say married Agnes, daughter of Hugh de Grandmesnil, but his connection to the later titleholders is not confirmed.

However, the history of the title has been traced to another William de Saye, who was granted lands by Empress Matilda in 1141–42 and, at a later time in The Anarchy, joined his brother-in-law Geoffrey de Mandeville, 1st Earl of Essex, fighting against King Stephen of England. This William was likely killed in the same raid on Burwell Castle that killed Essex.

De Saye arms: Quarterly or and gules

William's eldest son, William II de Saye, had two daughters, one of whom, Beatrice, married Geoffrey Fitz Peter, 1st Earl of Essex (of the second creation). Lands held by the de Maminots — including the Manor of Deptford, known now as Sayes Court — came to the family through Alice, daughter of Hugh II de Maminot, who married William II de Saye's second son, Geoffrey II de Saye. The Sayes also adopted the Maminot arms, quarterly or and gules. Geoffrey II de Saye filed legal suits against his cousin, the new Earl of Essex, for the lands belonging to the Mandeville family. His son Geoffrey III de Saye, who held the Lordship of West Greenwich inherited from his mother, was one of the 25 feudal barons who stood surety for Magna Carta in 1215. His son William III de Saye traveled with and fought for Henry III and is recorded as a witness for the Treaty of York in 1237. William IV de Saye fought for Edward I in his conquest of Wales (1277–1283).

His grandson Geoffrey III de Saye was created feudal baron Saye by writ in 1313. His son Geoffrey IV de Saye, the second baron, married Lady Maud de Beauchamp, daughter of 10th Earl of Warwick. Their son William, the third baron, was knighted in 1361 and married Beatrice, daughter of Sir Thomas de Brewose (Breouse/Brewes/Braose). William died by 7 August 1375, leaving the title to their young son John, who died a few years later.

The title then passed to John's sister Elizabeth, 16. She married Sir John de Falvesle, 1st Lord Falvesley. Following his death she married secondly Sir William Heron, who sat in Parliament as Lord Say by right of his wife. She died in 1399 without heirs, after which the barony became abeyant among her three aunts. Idonea was married to John de Clinton, 3rd Lord de Clinton; Joan married Sir William Fiennes (died 1359); and Elizabeth married Sir Thomas de Aldoun.

Of the three, only Joan had male issue. Her second but eldest surviving son Sir William Fiennes (died 1403) was the father of Sir Roger Fiennes, MP for Sussex and Treasurer of the Household. With the spoils of the Hundred Years' War, Sir Roger built Herstmonceux Castle. His elder son Sir Richard Fiennes was called to Parliament as 7th Lord Dacre in right of his wife, Joan Dacre, 7th Baroness Dacre.

The Barony of Saye and Sele is thought to have been created by letters patent in 1447 for William’s second son, James Fiennes, for his services in the Hundred Years' War. The patent creating the original barony was lost, so it was assumed that the barony was created by writ, meaning that it could descend to heirs-general, and not only heirs-male.

Fiennes-Saye arms

However, several authorities, including Burke's Peerage, agree that the assumption was erroneous, and that the original creation was by letters patent, and thus identify the initial holder as Lordship of Saye and Sele.

His son, the second baron, was summoned to Parliament but killed at the Battle of Barnet in 1471. His son, the de jure third Baron, was known as Lord Saye and Sele but was never summoned to Parliament. The peerage is therefore considered to have become dormant (unclaimed) on the death of the second Baron. His great-great-great-grandson, Richard Fiennes, the de jure seventh baron, claimed the title in 1573. For years, he remained unsuccessful, but in 1603 James I granted him letters patent confirming his right to the title. The patent confirmed that the barony created in 1447 belonged to Richard Fiennes, but on the condition that, for the purposes of precedence or seniority, it would be considered as having been created in 1603, and also provided that no future Baron Saye and Sele would assert the precedence of 1447. The patent, furthermore, allowed the title to pass to heirs-general, based on the erroneous assumption that the barony was created by writ.

William Fiennes, the eighth Baron, was created Viscount Saye and Sele, also in the Peerage of England, in 1624. On the death of his son, the second Viscount, the two titles separated. The barony fell into abeyance between the late Baron's daughters Hon. Elizabeth, wife of John Twisleton, and Hon. Frances, wife of Andrew Ellis. The Viscountcy could only be passed on to male heirs and was inherited by the Baron's nephew, the third Viscount. He was the son of Nathaniel Fiennes, second son of the first Viscount. When his son, the fourth Viscount, died, this line of the family also failed. He was succeeded by his cousin, the fifth Viscount. He was the son of John Fiennes, third son of the first Viscount. He was in his turn succeeded by another cousin, the sixth Viscount. On his death in 1781, there were no more male heirs left of the first Viscount, and the title became extinct.

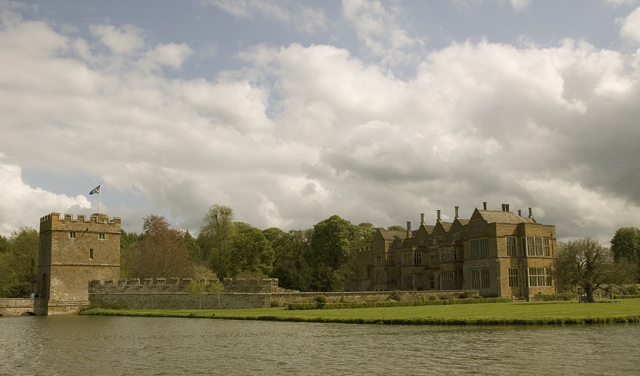
Broughton Castle in Oxfordshire, family seat of the Barons Saye and Sele

By 1715, all of the coheirs to the Barony of Saye and Sele had died save one; Cecil Twisleton, de jure tenth Baroness Saye and Sele. She was the daughter of the aforementioned Hon. Elizabeth, daughter of the second Viscount Saye and Sele. However, the barony was only formally called out of abeyance in favour of her great-grandson, Thomas Twisleton, who became the thirteenth Baron Saye and Sele. He was a General in the Army. His son, the fourteenth Baron, assumed the additional surnames of Fiennes and Eardley in 1825. He was succeeded by his son, the fifteenth Baron, who in his turn was succeeded by his cousin, the sixteenth Baron. In 1849 he assumed the additional surnames of Wykeham-Fiennes (the first Viscount Saye and Sele was a descendant of the sister and heiress of William of Wykeham). His grandson, the eighteenth Baron, served as Comptroller of the Household from 1912 to 1915 in the Liberal government of H. H. Asquith. As of 2024 the title is held by his great-grandson, the twenty-second Baron. In 1965 he relinquished the additional surnames of Twisleton and Wykeham.

Eustace Edward Fiennes, second son of the seventeenth Baron, represented Banbury in Parliament and also served as Governor of the Leeward Islands. In 1916 he was created a baronet, of Banbury in the County of Oxford. Since 1944 the baronetcy has been held by his grandson, explorer Ranulph Fiennes. Actors Ralph Fiennes and Joseph Fiennes are from a cadet branch of the family, being descended from Frederick the sixteenth Baron.

Through the marriage of the second Viscount to a daughter of Edward Cecil, 1st Viscount Wimbledon, the family descends from William Cecil, 1st Baron Burghley, as well as the Plantagenet Kings of England.

== List of titleholders ==
=== Lord Saye (1313) ===
- Geoffrey de Saye, 1st Lord Saye (1281–1322)
- Geoffrey de Saye, 2nd Lord Saye (c. 1305 – 26 June 1359)
- William de Saye, 3rd Lord Saye (17 June 1314 – 1375)
- John de Saye 4th Lord Say (c. 1373 – 27 July 1382)
- Elizabeth de Saye de Falvesley Heron, (5th) Baroness Say and suo jure Baroness Leybourne (24 February 1356 – 8 July 1399)

=== Lord (Baron) Saye and Sele (1447) ===
- James Fiennes, 1st Baron Saye and Sele (c. 1395–1450)
- William Fiennes, 2nd Baron Saye and Sele (c. 1428–1471)
- Henry Fiennes, de jure 3rd Baron Saye and Sele (c. 1460–1476)
- Richard Fiennes, de jure 4th Baron Saye and Sele (12 April 1471 – 1501)
- Edward Fiennes, de jure 5th Baron Saye and Sele (c. 1500–1528)
- Richard Fiennes, de jure 6th Baron Saye and Sele (c. 1520–1573)

=== Baron Saye and Sele (1603) ===
- Richard Fiennes, 7th Baron Saye and Sele (c. 1557–1613)
- William Fiennes, 8th Baron Saye and Sele (1582–1662; created Viscount Saye and Sele 1624)

=== Viscount Saye and Sele (1624) ===
- William Fiennes, 1st Viscount Saye and Sele, 8th Baron Saye and Sele (1582–1662)
- James Fiennes, 2nd Viscount Saye and Sele, 9th Baron Saye and Sele (c. 1603–1674) (eldest son) (barony abeyant as well as dormant 1674; see below for continuation); succeeded in the viscountcy only by his brother Nathaniel's son
- William Fiennes, 3rd Viscount Saye and Sele (c. 1641–1698) (nephew)
- Nathaniel Fiennes, 4th Viscount Saye and Sele (1676–1710) (son)
- Laurence Fiennes, 5th Viscount Saye and Sele (c. 1690–1742) (cousin, son of Col. John Fiennes, 3rd son of 1st Viscount)
- Richard Fiennes, 6th Viscount Saye and Sele (1716–1781)

=== Barons Saye and Sele (1603; reverted) ===
- Cecil Twisleton, de jure 10th Baroness Saye and Sele (d. 1723) (became sole heir in 1715)
- Fiennes Twistleton, de jure 11th Baron Saye and Sele (1670–1730)
- John Twisleton, de jure 12th Baron Saye and Sele (1698–1763)
- Thomas Twisleton, 13th Baron Saye and Sele (c. 1735–1788) (dormancy terminated in his favour)
- Gregory William Eardley-Twisleton-Fiennes, 14th Baron Saye and Sele (1769–1844)
- William Thomas Eardley-Twisleton-Fiennes, 15th Baron Saye and Sele (1798–1847)
- Frederick Benjamin Twisleton-Wykeham-Fiennes, 16th Baron Saye and Sele (1799–1887) Archdeacon of Hereford
- John Fiennes Twisleton-Wykeham-Fiennes, 17th Baron Saye and Sele (1830–1907)
- Geoffrey Cecil Twisleton-Wykeham-Fiennes, 18th Baron Saye and Sele (1858–1937)
- Geoffrey Rupert Cecil Twisleton-Wykeham-Fiennes, 19th Baron Saye and Sele (1884–1949)
- Ivo Murray Twisleton-Wykeham-Fiennes, 20th Baron Saye and Sele (1885–1968)
- Nathaniel Thomas Allen Fiennes, 21st Baron Saye and Sele (1920–2024)
- Martin Guy Fiennes, 22nd Baron Saye and Sele (born 1961)

The heir apparent is the present holder's eldest son, Guy Fiennes (born 1997)

== See also ==
- Twisleton-Wykeham-Fiennes family
- Twisleton-Wykeham-Fiennes baronets, of Banbury
