= Twisleton-Wykeham-Fiennes family =

British noble family

The Twisleton-Wykeham-Fiennes family (/ˈwɪkəm ˈfaɪnz/) are the descendants of the 16th Baron Saye and Sele who was born Frederick Benjamin Twisleton and adopted the surname Twisleton-Wykeham-Fiennes in 1849 by Act of Parliament. He was the grandson of Thomas Twisleton, 13th Baron Saye and Sele and inherited the barony from his first cousin William Thomas Eardley-Twisleton-Fiennes in 1847. The surname is frequently shortened to Fiennes. Members of the family include the explorer Ranulph Fiennes and the actors Ralph Fiennes, Joseph Fiennes, and Hero Fiennes Tiffin.

== Ancestry ==
The ancestry of the family includes James Fiennes, 1st Baron Saye and Sele (1395–1450) and his father William de Fiennes. Richard Fiennes, a nephew of the 1st Baron, became the 7th Baron Dacre after marrying the daughter of the 6th Baron Dacre.

The family are descendants of Thomas Wykeham, the great-nephew of William of Wykeham (c. 1320–1404) who left his fortune to his great-nephew. The inheritance included Broughton Castle which became the home of the Barons Saye and Sele, after Thomas Wykeham's granddaughter married William Fiennes, 2nd Baron Saye and Sele.

The Twisleton-Wykeham-Fiennes family are also descendants of John Twisleton (c. 1614–1682) who married Elizabeth Fiennes, the daughter of James Fiennes, 2nd Viscount Saye and Sele, 9th Baron Saye and Sele. Elizabeth Fiennes's mother was Frances Cecil, daughter of Edward Cecil, 1st Viscount Wimbledon, so the family also descends from William Cecil, 1st Baron Burghley.

The 21st Baron Saye and Sele, Nathaniel Fiennes, changed his surname by deed poll to Fiennes in 1965.

== See also ==
- Twisleton-Wykeham-Fiennes baronets
- Baron Saye and Sele
- Viscount Saye and Sele
