= Broughton Castle =

Medieval manor house in Oxfordshire, England

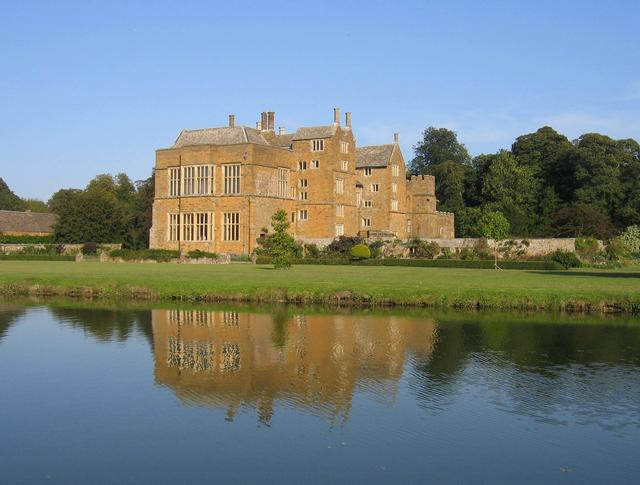

- Location within Oxfordshire
- 52°02′26″N 1°23′31″W
- Type: Fortified manor house
- Location: Broughton, Oxfordshire
- OS grid reference: SP4180938173

History
- Built: 1306; 720 years ago, 1406; 620 years ago Crenellated, 1550; 476 years ago Rebuilt

Site notes
- Owner: Private

Listed Building – Grade I
- Official name: Broughton Castle and attached walls
- Designated: 8 December 1955
- Reference no.: 1248742

National Register of Historic Parks and Gardens
- Official name: Broughton Castle
- Designated: 1 June 1984
- Reference no.: 1001088

Broughton Castle is a medieval fortified manor house in the village of Broughton, which is about two miles (3 km) southwest of Banbury in Oxfordshire, England, on the B4035 road (grid reference SP418382).

It is the home of the Fiennes (in full Twisleton-Wykeham-Fiennes) family, Barons Saye and Sele. The castle sits on an artificial island in pastureland and is surrounded by a wide moat. Across the small bridge lies the parish church of St Mary the Virgin, surrounded by its historic cemetery. A Grade I listed building, it opens to the public during the summer.

== History ==
=== Romano-British period ===
In 2021, Time Team excavated a Roman villa on the site, recently discovered by metal detectorist and amateur archaeologist, Keith Westcott. Previously, a lead-lined sarcophagus containing the burial of a wealthy Romano-British woman was discovered and partly investigated in the 1960s.

Geophysical surveys indicated a large winged or courtyard villa rustica comparable with that nearby at North Leigh. Limited excavations by Time Team showed at least two wings existed. The villa was occupied and developed from the 1st to the 4th c. AD. Large adjoining terraced ponds were used to manage water flows.

Found material, including mosaic tesserae and hypocaust flue tiles, as well as the sarcophagus, suggested a villa of high status on this site.

=== 14th century to present ===
The castle was built as a manor house by Sir John de Broughton in 1300 at a location where the confluence of three streams created a natural site for a moated manor. The house was sold in 1377 to William of Wykeham, Bishop of Winchester, and has remained in the same family since that time. The original house was crenellated in 1406 by Sir Thomas Wykeham. In 1451, it passed by inheritance to the Fiennes family, Barons Saye and Sele. Beginning in 1550, Richard Fiennes transformed the medieval manor into a house in the Tudor style, significantly expanding the building. James I stayed at Broughton Castle on several occasions.

In the 17th century, The 1st Viscount Saye and Sele, known as "Old Subtlety", was one of the leading activists against Charles I. As a result, the castle was used by Parliamentarian sympathisers, such as John Pym and John Hampden, as a meeting place in the decade leading up to the Civil War. The 1st Viscount raised troops to fight against the king at the inconclusive Battle of Edgehill in 1642. In the following days, Royalist troops besieged the castle, quickly overcoming the defenders and occupying the castle for a time. Following the end of hostilities, reconstruction work needed to be undertaken to repair damage inflicted by Royalist cannon. Lord Saye and Sele had evaded signing Charles I's Death Warrant and was able to make his peace with the Crown after the English Restoration.

Broughton fell into decay in the 19th century, but was eventually rescued by The Ven. Frederick Fiennes, 16th Baron Saye and Sele, who served as Archdeacon of Hereford, and who brought in the prominent Victorian architect Sir George Gilbert Scott. At the turn of the century, the house was rented by the Edwardian socialite Lady Algernon Gordon-Lennox, who transformed the gardens and hosted Edward VII at the castle. It was the childhood home of Ivy Cavendish-Bentinck, Duchess of Portland.

It is still the home of the Fiennes family.

== Main rooms ==
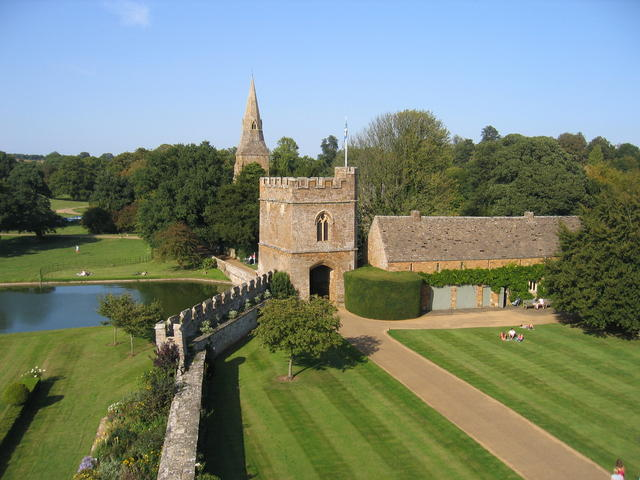
The gatehouse

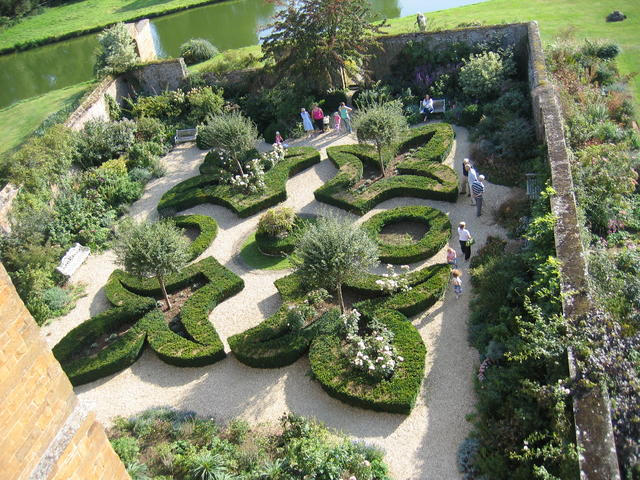
Formal garden

The gatehouse is from 1406, and the block to its left, now the shop and cafe, has Gothic windows facing the moat. The main facade is medieval to the left, but in Elizabethan prodigy house style at the centre and right. The chapel is 14th-century Decorated Gothic, the other main rooms that are opened mainly Elizabethan. The great hall runs along the facade. Upstairs there is a long gallery overlooking the gardens at the rear. The building also had a Solar, but this was later converted into a kitchen wing.

The best bedrooms have two very elaborate chimneypieces, in the Queen's Bedroom (used by Anne of Denmark) a stone one heavily decorated with ornament in a style "proclaiming the Renaissance but simultaneously revealing a still very imperfect comprehension of what it was all about". This was presumably the result of a local carver with access to an ornament pattern book such as those by Hans Vredeman de Vries; the two human heads still look distinctly medieval. The other chimneypiece, in the bedroom James I used, is at another stylistic extreme; a very polished and spacious stucco piece in a style comparable to that of the First School of Fontainebleau, and probably not made by English artists. The central medallion, with a mythological scene, was designed by Rosso Fiorentino, and also appears in the Palace of Fontainebleau. This is flanked by statues of two large nude boys. The Italian artists of the Tudor court Henry VIII used at Nonsuch Palace have been suggested; the pieces were almost certainly made elsewhere and taken to Broughton.

There are several fine plasterwork ceilings, the most spectacular in the Great Parlour on the first floor, and the Oak Room below it. There is 18th-century painted Chinese wallpaper of different tree, bird and flower designs in three bedrooms, in very good condition. At roof level there is a room believed to be that "with no ears", where the 1st viscount plotted with Parliamentary leaders in the years before the English Civil War. The gardens have long herbaceous borders, at their best in summer.

== In film and television ==
Broughton Castle has been used extensively as a filming location for both film and television productions, particularly period dramas, due to its well-preserved medieval and early modern architecture.

=== Film ===
The castle has featured in several notable films, including:

- The Slipper and the Rose (1976)
- The Scarlet Pimpernel (1982)
- Oxford Blues (1984)
- Three Men and a Little Lady (1990)
- The Madness of King George (1994)
- Shakespeare in Love (1998)
- Jane Eyre (2011)
- Ladies First (2026)

=== Television ===
Television productions filmed at Broughton Castle include:

- Elizabeth The Virgin Queen
- Mary & George
- Renegade Nell
- My Lady Jane
- The Crown
- Becoming Elizabeth
- Friends and Crocodiles
- 1975 Morecambe and Wise Christmas Show
- Hilary Mantel's Wolf Hall
- Keeping Up Appearances
- Noel's House Party.

== Concerts ==
In August 1981, British folk rock band Fairport Convention held their annual reunion concert at Broughton Castle, rather than the usual Cropredy location. The concert was recorded, and released on the album Moat on the Ledge (1982).

== Literature ==
Published in April 2009, The Music Room is a memoir by William Fiennes, youngest son of the 21st Baron Saye and Sele, about growing up with an older brother who had suffered brain damage due to epilepsy. The book describes their home, Broughton Castle, without ever naming it. It has been described as "a beautiful poem of a tribute to his family, his parents, the magical, moated castle that was his home".
