= Haddon (surname) =

Haddon is a surname. Notable people with the surname include:

== A ==
- Alfred Cort Haddon (1855–1940), British anthropologist
- April Haddon, fictional character
- Arthur Langan Haddon (1895-1961), New Zealand Church of Christ minister
- Arthur Trevor Haddon (1864-1941), British painter

== C ==
- Caroline Haddon (1837-1905), philosophical writer
- Celia Haddon (born 1944), British journalist and writer

== D ==
- Damita Haddon (born 1971), American gospel singer
- Dayle Haddon (1948–2024), Canadian model and actress
- Deitrick Haddon (born 1973), American gospel singer

== E ==
- Elizabeth Haddon (1680–1762), American colonist and Quaker

== F ==
- Frederick William Haddon (1839-1906), Australian journalist and newspaper editor

== H ==
- Harry Haddon (1871-after 1896), English professional footballer

== J ==
- James Haddon (fl. 1556), English clergyman
- Jenny Haddon (born 1933), English writer of romance novels under the name Sophie West

== K ==
- Kathleen Haddon (1888-1961), British scholar of string-figures

== L ==
- Laurence Haddon (1922–2013), American television actor
- Lloyd Haddon (born 1938), American hockey player

== M ==
- Mark Haddon (born 1962), English novelist

== O ==
- Oriwa Tahupotiki Haddon (1898-1958), New Zealand Methodist minister

== P ==
- Peter Haddon (1898-1962), English actor

== R ==
- Robert Joseph Haddon (1866-1929), English born Australian architect
- Robert Tahupotiki Haddon (1866-1936) New Zealand Methodist minister
- Ryan Haddon (born 1971), journalist and TV producer

== S ==
- Sam E. Haddon (born 1937), United States federal judge

== T ==
- Thomas Haddon (1913-1993), British soldier
- Trevor Haddon (1864-1941), British painter

== V ==
- Vivien Haddon (born 1945), New Zealand swimmer

== W ==
- Walter Haddon (1515-1572), English civil lawyer
- William Haddon Jr. (1926-1985), the inventor of the Haddon Matrix, the most common tool in the injury prevention field
