= Haddon =

Haddon may refer to:

== Places ==
- Haddon, Victoria, Australia, a township
- Haddon, Cambridgeshire, England, a village and civil parish
- Haddon Hill, Somerset, England, a ridge
- Haddon, Gauteng, South Africa, a suburb of Johannesburg
- Haddon Township, Sullivan County, Indiana, United States
- Haddon Township, New Jersey, United States
- Haddon Bay, Joinville Island, Antarctica
- Haddon, Derbyshire, an ancient settlement, see Haddon Hall

== People ==
- Haddon (surname)
- Haddon (given name)

== See also ==
- East Haddon, Northamptonshire
- Nether Haddon, Derbyshire
- Over Haddon, Derbyshire
- West Haddon, Northamptonshire
- Haddon Tunnel, Derbyshire
- Haddon Hall (disambiguation)
- Haddon Matrix
- Hadden
