= Hadden =

Hadden is the place name of:

- Hadden, Roxburghshire, Scotland

Hadden is a surname. Notable people with the surname include:

- Al Hadden (1899–1969), American professional football player
- Alf Hadden (1877–1936), Australian cricketer
- Briton Hadden (1898–1929), co-founder of Time magazine with Henry Luce and its first editor
- Charles Hadden (1854–1924), British Army major-general and Master-General of the Ordnance
- Dianne Hadden (born 1951), Australian politician
- Frank Hadden (born 1954), Scottish rugby union coach
- H. G. Hadden (1874–1945), American college football player and coach
- James Cuthbert Hadden (1861–1914), Scottish author, journalist, biographer and organist
- James Murray Hadden (died 1817), British Army office and Master General of the Ordnance
- Jeffrey K. Hadden (1937–2003), American professor of sociology
- Kamal Hadden (born 2001), American football player
- Martin Hadden (born c. 1970), British chef who won a Michelin star at two restaurants
- Matty Hadden (born 1990), rugby league player from Northern Ireland
- Peter Hadden (1950–2010), leading member of the Socialist Party in Northern Ireland
- Sally Hadden, American historian
- Sid Hadden (1877–1934), English cricketer
- Susan Hadden (1945–1995), American political scientist and professor
- Thomas Hadden (1871–1940), Scottish maker of ornamental ironwork
- Tommy Hadden (1840–1881), American saloon keeper, criminal and underworld figure in New York City
- Whitney Hadden (born 1949), known by his stage name, Whit Haydn or "Pop Haydn", magician and stage performer
- William J. Hadden (1921–1995), Protestant minister, local politician and civil rights advocate
- William L. Hadden (1896–1983), American politician, 67th Lieutenant Governor of Connecticut from 1943 to 1945

== See also ==
- Hadden Clark (born 1952), American murderer
- Arter & Hadden LLP, a Cleveland, Ohio-based law firm that traced its founding to 1843 and ceased operations in 2003
- Hadden-Margolis House, historic home located at Harrison, Westchester County, New York
- Ruth Hadden Memorial Award, award for the best first novel published in Britain
- Hadden Industries, a company in the 1997 science-fiction movie Contact
- Haddon (disambiguation)
