= Arthur Haddon =

Arthur Haddon may refer to:

- Arthur Langan Haddon (1895–1961), New Zealand Church of Christ minister
- Arthur Trevor Haddon (1864–1941), British painter and illustrator
