= Glyn Griffiths =

Welsh flying ace of the Second World War

- Born: 7 December 1917; Llandudno, Wales
- Died: 1983 (aged 65–66); Epsom, England
- Military career
- Allegiance: United Kingdom
- Branch: Royal Air Force
- Service years: 1938–1939; 1940–1946
- Rank: Flight Lieutenant
- Units: No. 17 Squadron; No. 4 Squadron
- Conflicts: Second World War: Battle of France; Battle of Britain
- Awards: Distinguished Flying Medal; Order of Leopold II with Palme (Belgium); Croix de Guerre

Glyn Griffiths DFM (7 December 1917 – 1983) was a British flying ace of the Royal Air Force (RAF) during the Second World War. He was credited with at least ten aerial victories.

From Wales, Griffiths briefly served in the RAF from 1938 to 1939, but had left the service prior to the outbreak of the Second World War. He rejoined as a pilot in the Volunteer Reserve and once his refresher training was complete, was posted to No. 17 Squadron. Flying Hawker Hurricane fighters, his first aerial success was during the Battle of France and he claimed several more during the subsequent Battle of Britain. After attending the Central Flying School in early 1941, he performed instructing duties for the next two years before returning to an operational posting in 1943 with No. 4 Squadron. In October he was involved in a mid-air collision and spent the remainder of the war recovering from his injuries. Released from the RAF in 1946, he worked as a gas engineer in the postwar period. He died in 1983, aged 65–66.

== Early life ==
Glyn Griffiths was born in Llandudno in Wales on 7 December 1917. His parents ran a café in the town. He went to John Bright County School and once his education was complete, he worked for the gas department of the Llandudno Urban District Council. He joined the Royal Air Force (RAF) in July 1938, commencing his initial training at that time and in September being granted a short service commission as an acting pilot officer. His service in the RAF was terminated in August 1939.

== Second World War ==
In early April 1940, Griffiths enlisted in the Royal Air Force Volunteer Reserve. As an airman pilot, he underwent refresher training at No. 5 Operational Training Unit (OTU). In May, he was briefly attached to No. 264 Squadron at Duxford, flying a Boulton Paul Defiant fighter on a few occasions before being sent to No. 6 OTU at Sutton Bridge later in the month. There he was familiarised with the Hawker Hurricane fighter before being posted to No. 17 Squadron on 25 May as a sergeant pilot. His unit was based at Kenley and equipped with Hurricanes, from where it provided aerial cover over Dunkirk during the evacuation of the British Expeditionary Force. The squadron subsequently operated from France itself the following month, flying from Le Mans and Dinard. Griffiths achieved his first aerial success on 7 June, damaging a Messerschmitt Bf 109 fighter over Oisemont. Ten days later, the squadron returned to the United Kingdom and its personnel were rested for a week.

=== Battle of Britain ===
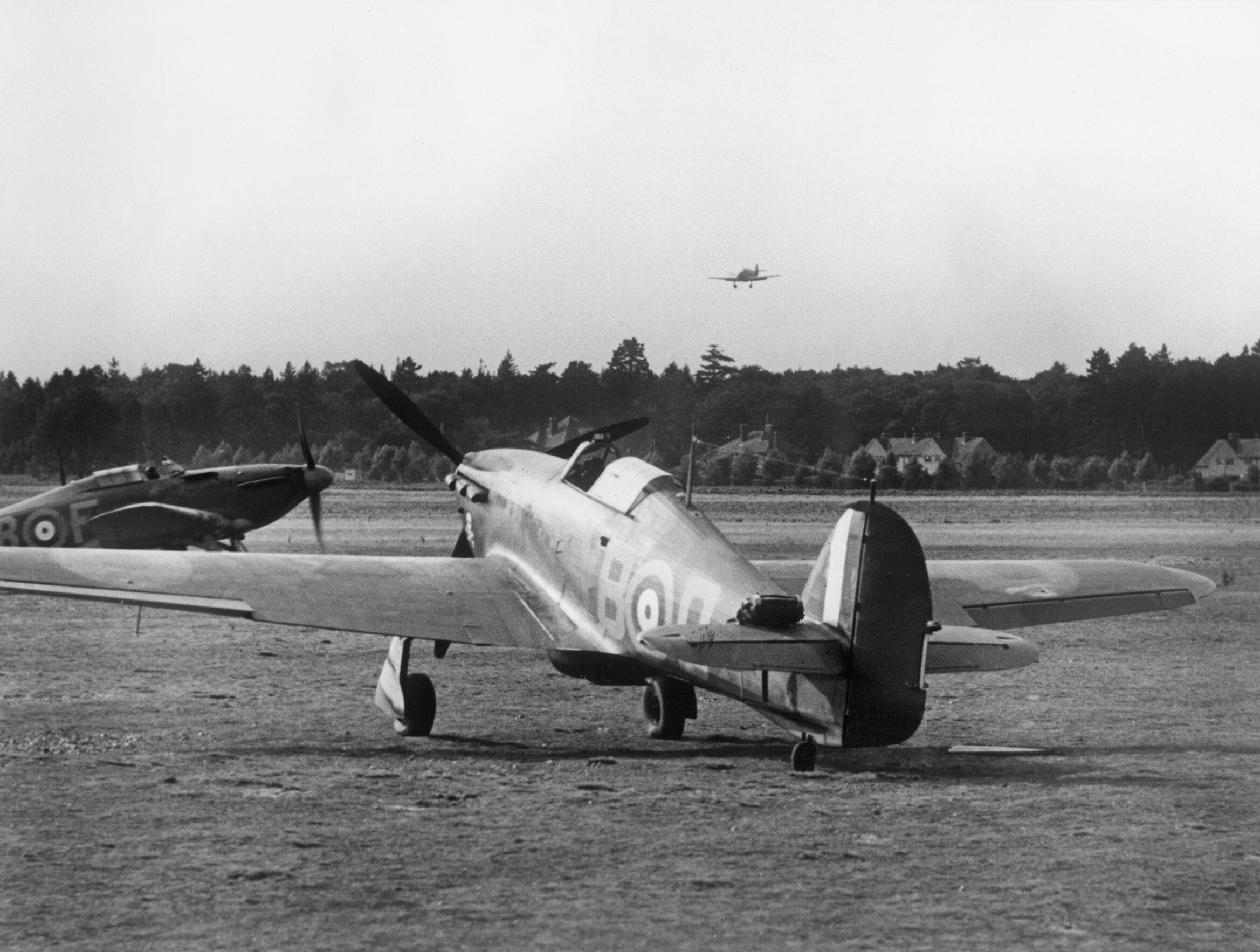
Hawker Hurricanes of No. 17 Squadron at Debden, in July 1940

Now based at Debden, No. 17 Squadron would be engaged for much of the Battle of Britain. Griffiths, on 9 July, shared in the destruction of a Heinkel He 111 medium bomber over the English Channel. Three days later, he destroyed two more He 111s, one shared, to the east of Aldeburgh. On 11 August, he shared in shooting down a Messerschmitt Bf 110 heavy fighter over the English Channel. A He 111 was deemed to have probably been destroyed by Griffiths in the vicinity of Gravesend on 5 September. His aircraft was damaged in an engagement on 18 August, which required Griffiths to make an emergency landing at Manston. There his Hurricane was destroyed when the airfield was strafed by Luftwaffe aircraft.

On 19 September, Griffiths shared in the destruction of a Junkers Ju 88 medium bomber near Orfordness. He destroyed one Bf 110 and probably shot down a second, both in the area of Redhill, on 27 September. The same day he destroyed a Bf 109 to the south of Dungeness. He was one of two pilots involved in damaging a Dornier Do 17 medium bomber over Canterbury on 27 October and three days later probably shot down a Bf 109 near West Malling. On 8 November, No. 17 Squadron intercepted around 30 Junkers Ju 87 dive bombers attacking destroyers of the Royal Navy that were steaming near the Essex coast; Griffiths shot down three Ju 87s, one of which was shared with another pilot, out of the thirteen that were claimed to have been destroyed by the squadron. However, military aviation historian Andy Saunders notes that in reality, several of the allegedly destroyed Ju 87s returned to their airfields.

In recognition of his successes over the preceding months, he was awarded the Distinguished Flying Medal (DFM) in late November. He was the first man from Llandudno to receive a gallantry award in the Second World War. The citation for his DFM, published in The London Gazette, read:

This airman has shown splendid courage and initiative in his attacks against the enemy. He has destroyed at least six of their aircraft, two of which were shot down in one day.

— The London Gazette, No. 35001, 26 November 1940.

=== Later war service ===
In late December, Griffiths was posted to the Central Flying School at Upavon to train as an instructor. This was a duty he performed for much of the next two years, including a time in Canada. In the summer of 1943 he returned to the United Kingdom as a flying officer, having been commissioned the previous year. He was posted to No. 4 Squadron, an army cooperation unit equipped with North American Mustang III fighters at Odiham. On return from an operation to France on 16 October, Griffiths's wingman collided with his aircraft, which was set afire. It took some time for Griffiths to bale out and he was badly burnt. His wingman was killed in the collision.

Griffiths was hospitalised and was in medical care for the remainder of the war. During this time he was promoted to flight lieutenant. He ended the war credited with having destroyed ten aircraft, five of which were shared with other pilots, and damaged two others. He is also believed to have probably destroyed three aircraft.

== Later life ==
Returning to civilian life after being released by the RAF in 1946, Griffiths found employment in London, working as an engineer with the Gaslight and Coke Company. In June 1947, the Belgian government awarded Griffiths the Order of Leopold II with Palme and Croix de Guerre for "services in the liberation of Belgium". He died in Epson, in Surrey, in 1983. His medals, which in addition to the DFM, Order of Leopold II with Palme and Croix de Guerre, include the 1939–1945 Star with Battle of Britain clasp, the Atlantic Star, the Defence Medal, and the War Medal, are displayed at the National Museum in Cardiff.
