= Frances Saunders =

Frances Saunders may refer to:

- Frances Stonor Saunders (born 1966), British journalist and historian
- Frances Saunders (scientist) (born 1954), British scientist

== See also ==
- Francis Saunders (1513/14–1585), English politician
