= Richard Wenman, 4th Viscount Wenman =

English landowner and politician

Richard Wenman, 4th Viscount Wenman (1657 – 1 March 1690), known as Sir Richard Wenman, Bt, between 1680 and 1686, was an English landowner and politician.

Wenman was the only surviving son of Sir Francis Wenman, 1st Baronet, by Mary, daughter of Thomas Wenman, brother of Richard Wenman, 1st Viscount Wenman. He was returned to parliament for Brackley in 1679, a seat he held until his death eleven years later. In 1680 he succeeded his father in the baronetcy. Six years later he succeeded his great-uncle Philip Wenman, 3rd Viscount Wenman, as fourth Viscount Wenman according to the new patent obtained by the third Viscount in 1683 (the fourth Viscount is in some sources referred to as the second Viscount Wenman). This was an Irish peerage and did not disqualify him from remaining a member of the House of Commons.

Lord Wenman married Catherine, eldest daughter and co-heir of Sir Thomas Chamberlayne, 2nd Baronet, of Wickham and Northbrooke, Oxfordshire. They had one son and two daughters. He died in March 1690 and was succeeded in the baronetcy and viscountcy by his only son, Richard.

Parliament of England
Preceded by Sir Thomas Crew; William Lisle	Member of Parliament for Brackley; 1679–1690; With: Sir William Egerton 1679–1681; William Lisle 1681–1685; James Griffin 1685–1689; John Parkhurst 1689–1690	Succeeded by Sir William Egerton; Sir John Blencowe
Peerage of Ireland
Preceded by Philip Wenman	Viscount Wenman; 1686–1690	Succeeded by Richard Wenman
Baronetage of England
Preceded by Francis Wenman	Baronet (of Caswell); 1680–1690	Succeeded by Richard Wenman
