= Viscount Wenman =

Noble title in the Peerage of Ireland

Viscount Wenman, of Tuam in the County of Galway, was a title in the Peerage of Ireland. It was created on 30 July 1628 for Sir Richard Wenman, Member of Parliament for Oxfordshire in 1620 and 1625, the son of Thomas Wenman (died 1577), a Buckinghamshire landowner. He was made Baron Wenman, of Kilmaynham in the County of Meath, at the same time, also in the Peerage of Ireland. He was succeeded by his son, the second Viscount. He represented Brackley and Oxfordshire in Parliament. On his death the titles passed to his younger brother, the third Viscount. After the death of his childless only son, he obtained a new patent in 1683, with remainder to his great-nephew, Sir Richard Wenman, 2nd Baronet, with the precedence of 1628. The latter succeeded as fourth Viscount according to the new patent in 1686. He had earlier represented Brackley in Parliament. His grandson, the sixth Viscount, represented Oxford in the House of Commons. On the latter's death the titles passed to his son, the seventh Viscount. He sat as Member of Parliament for Oxfordshire for many years. The titles became extinct on his death in 1800. As all the peerage titles were in the Peerage of Ireland, the Viscounts did not have the right to sit in the British House of Lords.

The Wenman Baronetcy, of Caswell in the County of Oxford, was created in the Baronetage of England on 29 November 1662 for Francis Wenman, later Member of Parliament for Oxfordshire. He was succeeded by his son, the aforementioned second Baronet, who succeeded as fourth Viscount Wenman in 1686.

The Honourable Sophia, sister and heiress of the seventh Viscount, married William Humphrey Wykeham, of Swalcliffe. In 1834 the Wenman title was revived in favour of their granddaughter, Sophia Wykeham, who was created Baroness Wenman, of Thame Park and Swalcliffe in the County of Oxford. Lady Wenman never married and the title became extinct upon her death aged eighty in 1870.

== Viscounts Wenman (1628) ==
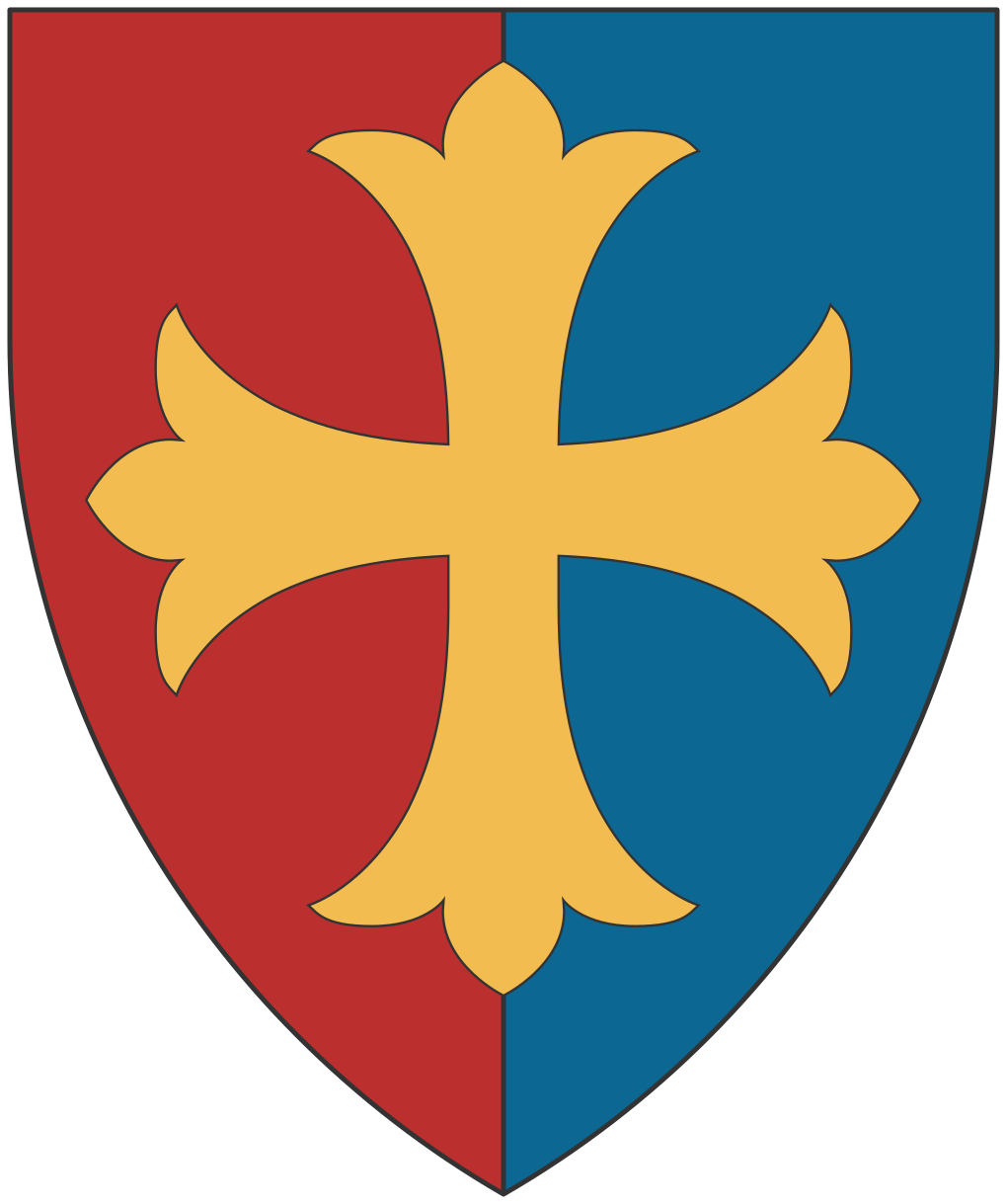
Arms of Viscounts Wenman

- Richard Wenman, 1st Viscount Wenman (1573–1640)
- Thomas Wenman, 2nd Viscount Wenman (died 1665)
- Philip Wenman, 3rd Viscount Wenman (1610–1686) (obtained new patent 1683)
- Richard Wenman, 4th Viscount Wenman (1657–1690)
- Richard Wenman, 5th Viscount Wenman (1688–1729)
- Philip Wenman, 6th Viscount Wenman (1719–1760)
- Philip Wenman, 7th Viscount Wenman (1742–1800)

== Wenman Baronets, of Caswell (1662) ==
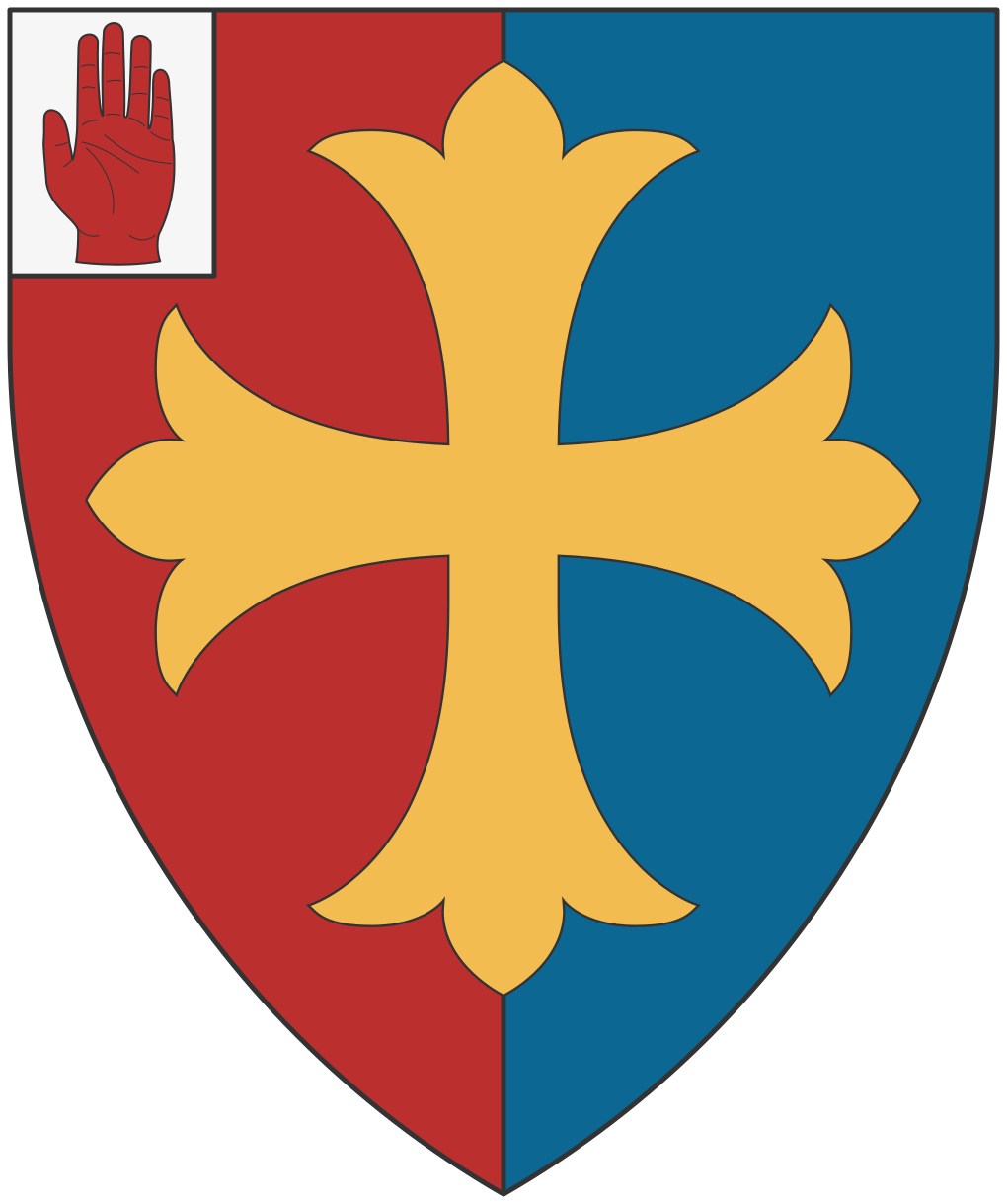
Arms of Wenman of Caswell

- Sir Francis Wenman, 1st Baronet (c. 1630–1680)
- Sir Richard Wenman, 2nd Baronet (1657–1690) (succeeded as Viscount Wenman in 1686)

== Baroness Wenman (1834) ==
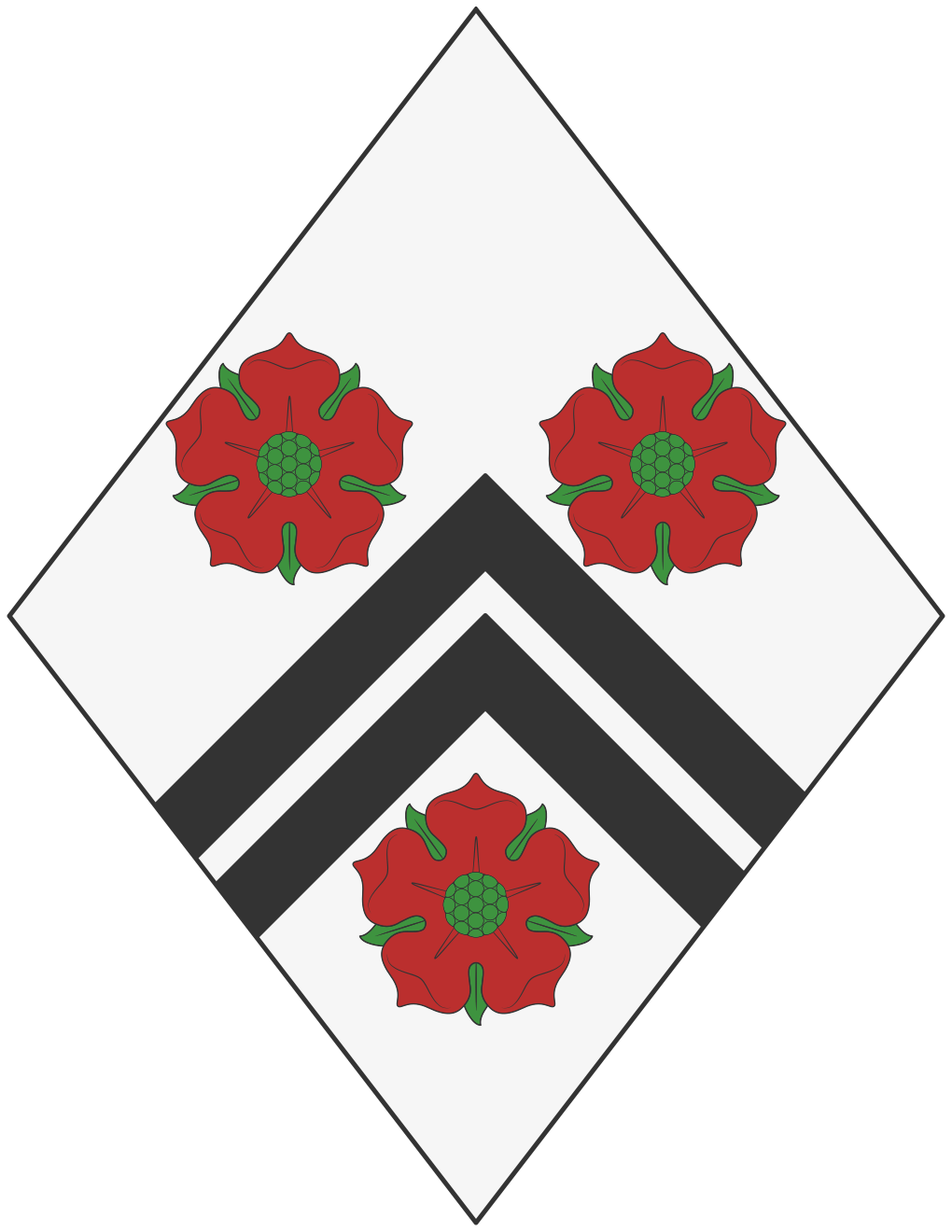
Arms of Wykeham, Baronesses Wenman

- Sophia Wykeham, 1st Baroness Wenman (1790–1870)
