= Drew Saunders =

Drew Saunders may refer to:

- Drew P. Saunders (born 1938), Democratic member of the North Carolina General Assembly
- Drew Saunders (MP) (died 1579), Member of Parliament (MP) for Brackley

== See also ==
- Andrew Saunders (disambiguation)
