= Andrew Saunders (disambiguation) =

Andrew Saunders (1931–2009) was a British expert in artillery fortifications.

Andrew Saunders may also refer to:

- Andy Saunders (military history writer), English author and researcher
- Andy Saunders (author, born 1974), who specialises in historical NASA imagery
- Andy Saunders (rugby league) (born 1994), Australian rugby league footballer

== See also ==
- Drew Saunders (disambiguation)
