= Marshe Dickinson =

British politician

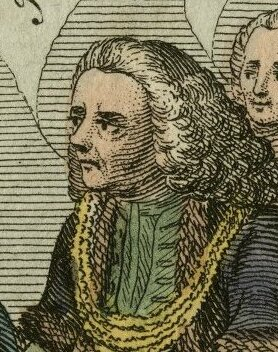
- Caricature of Dickinson from 1756

Chairman of Ways and Means
- In office November 1761 – February 1765
- Preceded by: Job Staunton Charlton
- Succeeded by: John Paterson

Lord Mayor of London
- In office 1756–1757
- Preceded by: Slingsby Bethell
- Succeeded by: Charles Asgill

Member of Parliament for Brackley
- In office 1754–1765
- Preceded by: Sewallis Shirley
- Succeeded by: John Montagu

Personal details
- Born: 24 June 1703 City of London, Middlesex
- Died: 6 February 1765 (aged 61) St Albans, Hertfordshire
- Party: Tory; Bedfordite
- Relations: Alexander Ball (grandson)
- Education: Westminster School
- Occupation: Politician
- Profession: Attorney

Marshe Dickinson (24 June 1703 – 6 February 1765) was a British politician who sat in the House of Commons between 1754 and 1765 and held the office of Lord Mayor of London between 1756 and 1757. Dickinson served as a Tory Member of Parliament and was affiliated with the interest of the Duke of Bedford during his time in Parliament.

== Early life and career ==
Dickinson was the third son of John Dickinson, a London merchant and his wife Elizabeth, daughter of fellow merchant Thomas Powell and goddaughter of Francis Marshe. Dickinson was baptised at the parish church of St Peter le Poer on Broad Street in the City of London on 8 July 1703. Dickinson was educated at Westminster School until the age of fifteen in 1718 and later entered the Inner Temple before being called in 1728 after which he became a city attorney, later being listed as a practicing lawyer.

== Marriage and family ==
In 1726, aged 23, he married Mary Cleve, daughter of Alexander Cleeve and his wife Mary, both of London. Dickinson remained married to his wife until her death in 1732 at the age of 29, after which he does not appear to have remarried. From his marriage Dickinson had two children, Mary Marsh Dickinson born in 1728, and John Marsh Dickinson born in 1730.

Dickinson's son later served as Surveyor of the Gardens and sat on the Board of Green Cloth but was convinced to give up the position to Richard Vernon in favour of a pension despite his father's unease at the proposal. Through his daughter, who married Robert Ball in 1751, Dickinson was the grandfather of officer Ingram Ball and Sir Alexander Ball, later Civil Commissioner of Malta.

== Municipal politics ==
Dickinson was elected a common councillor in the City of London in 1738 and served until 1743. From 1749 until his death he served as an alderman, later becoming a Sheriff of London between 1751 and 1752, and serving a term as Lord Mayor of London between 1756 and 1757. In London politics Dickinson was considered a moderate Tory and aligned with fellow alderman and Member of Parliament for the City of London Robert Ladbroke.

Dickinson served as Lord Mayor between in the year from 1756 which fell at the same time as the loss of Minorca. Under him the City address presented by mainly Tory aldermen including Ladbroke and Dickinson to King George II asked for 'the authors of our late losses and disappointments to be inquired and punished' which the King informed the city would be the case. In March 1757 at the time of Admiral John Byng's trial and execution a handful of Tory aldermen attempted to gain Dickinson's support for a petition to spare Byng's life, which the Lord Mayor considered to be too late. Byng was executed less than a week later.

== Westminster politics ==
Dickinson was recommended in 1753 by the Duke of Bedford to his nephew the Duke of Bridgewater as a candidate to be brought into the next Parliament. In 1754 he contested the seat of Brackley in Northamptonshire, a pocket borough of Bridgewater managed by his uncle. Dickinson contested the seat along with Henry Vernon, an outgoing MP for Lichfield who was also patronised by Bedford. The contest occurred while the young Duke of Bridgewater was on his Grand Tour which enabled a strong local opposition to form and organise behind a hitherto unknown outsider, Thomas Humberston.

Bedford, fearing the loss of his nephew's interest in the seat authorised his election agents to spend anywhere up to two-thousand pounds to secure the election of the two pledged candidates. This proved difficult as the local opposition interest was alert and spent equally heavily, thus ensuring its success. Dickinson was easily returned, while Humberston narrowly outpolled Vernon. Humberston desired to consolidate his support in the borough, yet he died a year later, allowing the seat to revert to the Bedford interest.

In the House of Commons Dickinson sat as both a Tory and a Bedfordite at the same time, thus demonstrating the increasing strain that partisan labels were coming under by the midpoint of the 18th-century. Dickinson, like other Tories who owed their seats to Bedford, such as Robert Henley-Ongley were obliged to vote as the Duke pleased, unless issues of party principle intervened. He was proposed as a candidate in London at the 1761 general election, but withdrew after failing to receive sufficient support and was returned unopposed as a Member for Brackley with Robert Wood, an Anglo-Irish antiquarian and fellow Bedfordite.

Dickinson was among the over one-hundred Tories returned at the election, the last time a coherent Tory party was present at a general election during this period. At the reconvening of Parliament in October 1761 Dickinson was discussed as a potential candidate of Speaker of the House of Commons along with fellow Tory Thomas Prowse, Member for Prowse. Ultimately Sir John Cust was elected unanimously to serve as the new Speaker of the House after the resignation of long-serving Speaker Arthur Onslow. Dickinson was, however, elected as the Chairman of Ways and Means in November 1761, a position he was deemed suited to on account of his links to merchants and finance. From this post he was paid a £500 per annum stipend courtesy of the government's secret service funds.

In Parliament Dickinson was mostly interested in pedestrian matters, with him intervening in debates on the Insolvent Debtors' Act in November 1761, a toll on London Bridge in February 1762, a debate in March 1762 where Bedford's interests were involved, and a debate on a 'fish bill' with exemptions for Covent Garden Market later in March 1763. On the earlier March debate, Lewis Namier quotes James Harris who noted:

A bill had come to us from the Lords about certain trust lands at Tavistock, relating to the Duke of Bedford’s affairs, and which he had brought in. There was a clause in it to declare that those lands were to convey no right of voting in that borough. This got among the Commons as a breach of their privileges, and the bill had certainly been flung out had not Alderman Dickinson moved that it be withdrawn. He was mistaken in the manner of doing this, by beginning that he had authority from a noble duke, etc. We want no authority from noble dukes, nor from those greater than dukes, to empower us to do our acts.

Dickinson's political positions were often dictated by Bedford, as in the case of the aforementioned 'fish bill' where Dickinson reported that he was awaiting the Duke's direction on how to progress with the bill. The 1760s was a period in British politics characterised by ministerial instability, with a succession of seven short-lived ministries. This also coincided with the dissipating of the old Tory and Whig parties in favour of a series of personal parties constructed around leading political figures. Dickinson was among the Tories who aligned under the Bedfordite faction, among the smaller factions in Parliament during this period.

Dickinson generally followed the Bedfordite line and supported the Bute and Grenville ministries, which both included the Duke of Bedford within their ranks. Dickinson was a supporter of the peace preliminaries negotiated and agreed to by Bedford in Paris which brought the Seven Years' War to an end. Dickinson did, however, break with Bedford on occasion when his Tory principles or personal pride came into conflict with the Bedfordite line. A notable occasion of this was when Bedford attempted to convince Dickinson's son John to vacate his position on the Board of the Green Cloth in favour of Richard Vernon, with an assurance of a pension. The elder Dickinson viewed this as a slur upon his family, requesting Bedford desist and even appealed to King George III for assistance. Dickinson finally acquiesced upon receiving assurances that there would be no financial loss to his son and family.

Dickinson died while still in office on 6 February 1765 at the age of 61 in St Albans, Hertfordshire. He was survived by his two children in addition to their families. Dickinson was succeeded in a by-election in Brackley by John Montagu who likewise adhered to the Bedfordite line.

=== Electoral record ===
General Election 1754: Brackley
Party	Candidate	Votes	%	±%
Tory	Marshe Dickinson	33	50.0	N/A
Nonpartisan	Thomas Humberston	18	27.3	N/A
Whig	Henry Vernon	15	22.7	N/A
Turnout		33	N/A	N/A
Tory win				
Nonpartisan win				

General Election 1761: Brackley
Party	Candidate	Votes	%	±%
Tory	Marshe Dickinson	Unopposed	N/A	N/A
Whig	Robert Wood	Unopposed	N/A	N/A
Turnout		N/A	N/A	N/A
Tory hold				
Whig hold				

Civic offices
Preceded by Slingsby Bethell	Lord Mayor of London; 1756–1757	Succeeded by Charles Asgill

Parliament of Great Britain
Preceded by Sewallis Shirley; Richard Lyttelton	Member of Parliament for Brackley; 1754–1765; With: Thomas Humberston 1754–55; William Moreton 1755–61; Robert Wood 1761–65	Succeeded by John Montagu; Robert Wood
