= Haddon Hall (disambiguation) =

Haddon Hall is a country house in Derbyshire, England.

Haddon Hall may also refer to:

- Haddon Hall (Apex, North Carolina), a neighborhood located in Apex, North Carolina
- Haddon Hall (Cincinnati, Ohio), a registered historic place in Cincinnati, Ohio
- Haddon Hall (opera), the light opera by Sydney Grundy and Arthur Sullivan
- Chalfonte-Haddon Hall Hotel was a resort hotel on the boardwalk in Atlantic City, New Jersey
