= Sir Francis Wenman, 1st Baronet =

Sir Francis Wenman, 1st Baronet (c. 1630 – 2 September 1680) was an English politician who sat in the House of Commons from 1664 to 1679.

== Background ==
Wenman was the second son of Sir Francis Wenman of Caswell, Oxfordshire and his wife Ann Sandys, daughter of Sir Samuel Sandys of Omberslade, Worcestershire. His father, who was MP for Oxfordshire in the Short Parliament, died in 1641. Wenman's elder brother was killed in the King's service during the Cornish campaign of 1644. Wenman died at the age of around 50.

== Political career ==
Wenman was created baronet of Caswell on 29 November 1662. In 1664, he was elected Member of Parliament for Oxfordshire in the Cavalier Parliament and sat until 1679.

== Family ==
Wenman married Mary Wenman, only daughter of Thomas Wenman, and niece of Richard Wenman, 1st Viscount Wenman by whom he had issue, Thomas, Francis, Ferdinando, Elizabeth and Richard, of whom his only surviving son was Richard Wenman, 4th Viscount Wenman.

Wenman married secondly Elizabeth Fettiplace, daughter of Edward Fettiplace of Swinbrook, Oxon, by whom he had three sons and two daughters. Eldest daughter, Dozelina, married Richard Smith, Esq., and youngest daughter, Mary, married Gabriel Roberts, Esq. (ancestors of the Earls of Leicester 7th Creation through their grandson Wenman Roberts Coke).

Baronetage of England
New creation	Baronet (of Caswell); 1662–1680	Succeeded by Richard Wenman
