= Keith Mason (scientist) =

British astronomer

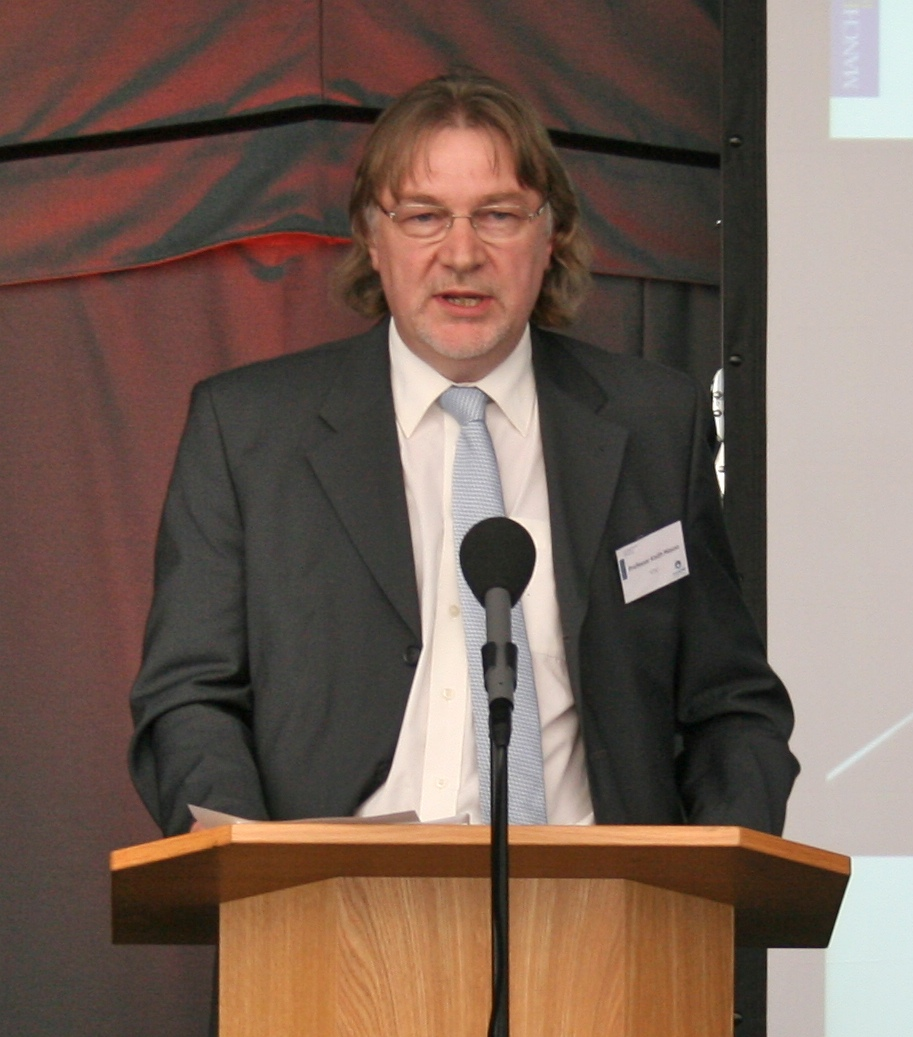
Keith Mason giving a talk in October 2007

Keith Mason (born 19 April 1951) was, until 1 November 2011, the Chief Executive of the Science and Technology Facilities Council (STFC) of the United Kingdom. He assumed the post on 1 April 2007 after the merger of the Council for the Central Laboratory of the Research Councils (CCLRC) and the Particle Physics and Astronomy Research Council (PPARC), having previously been chief executive of PPARC.

== Early life ==
He attended Ysgol John Bright, the John Bright Grammar School. After a farming childhood on the Llŷn Peninsula, Mason initially trained as an astronomer, studying for a BSc and PhD in Physics at University College London, and was a candidate astronaut.

== Career ==
He subsequently worked on X-ray astronomy at UC Berkeley before returning to the UCL Mullard Space Science Laboratory, eventually becoming a professor at UCL and director of the Mullard Laboratory in 2003.

Government offices
Preceded by New organisation	Chief Executive of STFC; April 2007 - October 2011	Succeeded by John Womersley
Preceded by	Chief Executive of PPARC: March 2007	Succeeded by Defunct organisation
