= Robert Wood (antiquarian) =

Anglo-Irish scholar, civil servant and politician

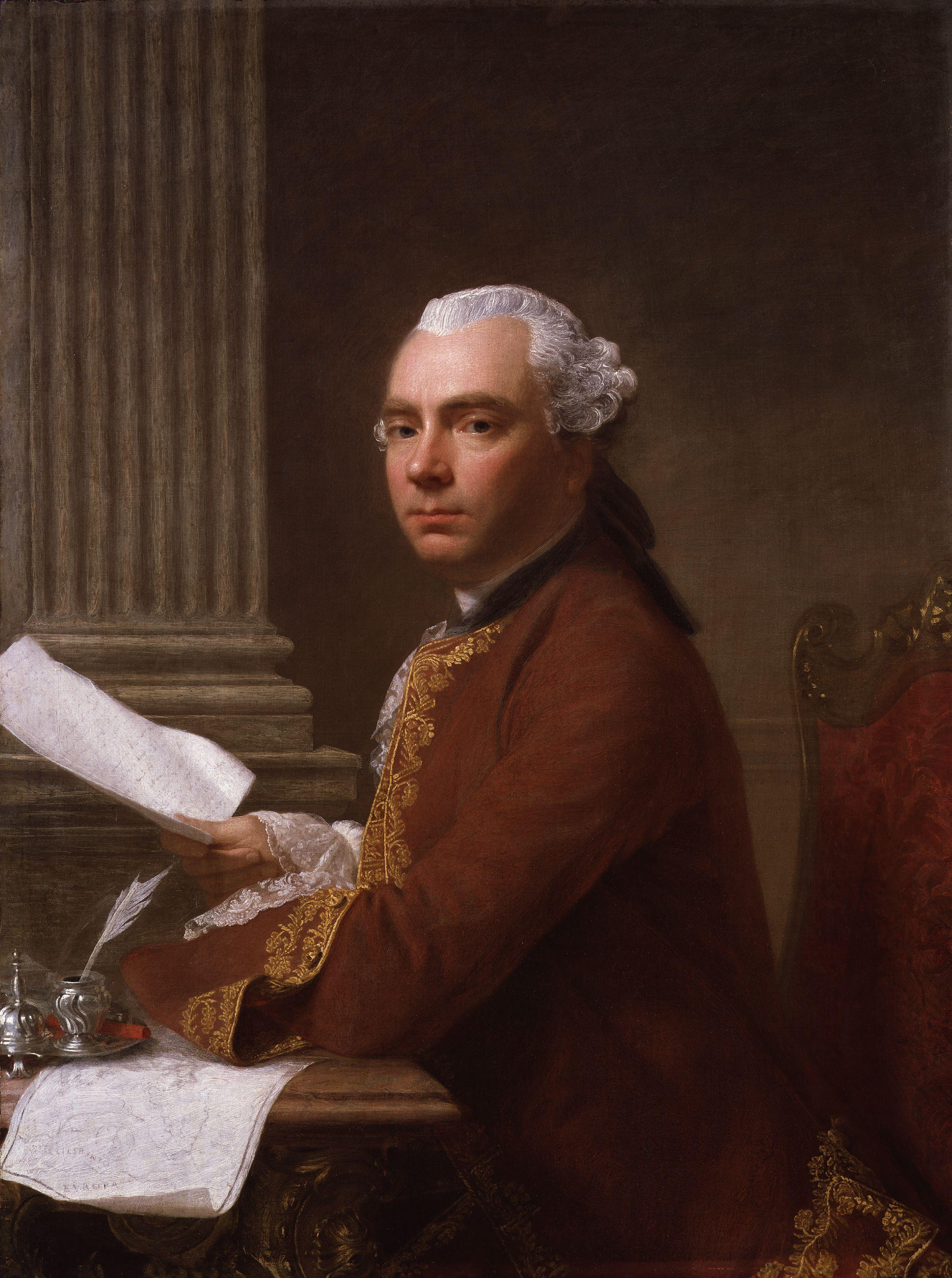
1755 portrait of Wood by Allan Ramsay

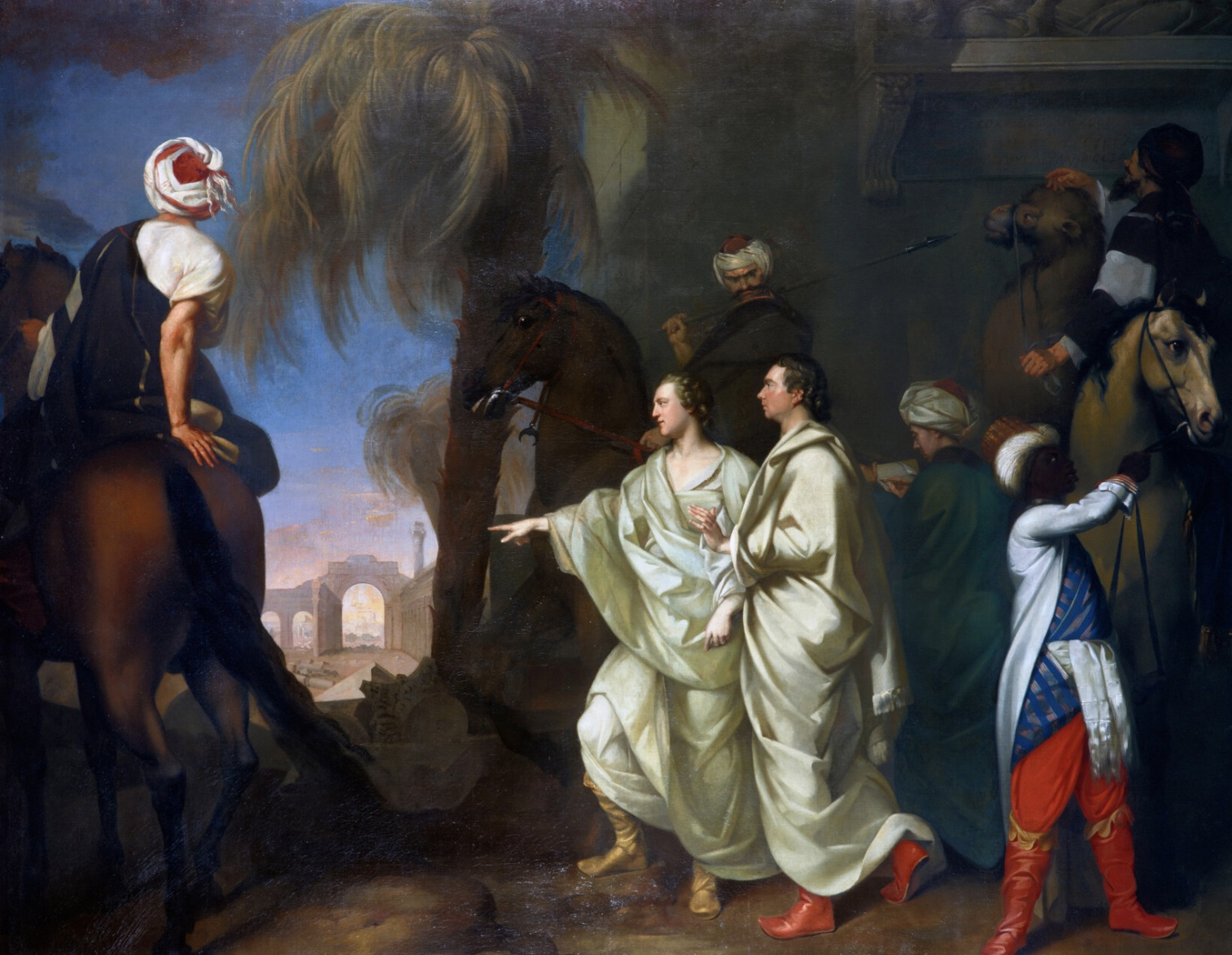
James Dawkins and Robert Wood Discovering the Ruins of Palmyra, by Gavin Hamilton (1758)

Robert Wood (1717 – 9 September 1771) was an Anglo-Irish scholar, civil servant and politician. He was the son of the Revd James Wood of Summerhill, County Meath and educated at Glasgow University (1732) and the Middle Temple (1736). His father was a patron of Hercules Rowley of Summerhill House. Between 1750 to 1751 Wood travelled around the Levant with two wealthy young Oxford scholars, James Dawkins and John Bouverie (who died of a fever early in their expedition) along with an Italian draftsman Giovanni Battista Borra. Their primary goal was to explore the Troad and locate the key sites mentioned by Homer. An account of the library Wood assembled for his journey explores how he managed and added to his collection during his voyage.

Moving south into Syria, they then took careful measurements and drawings of the ancient Roman ruins of Palmyra and Baalbek. The results of these were published in 1753 and 1757 in both English and French editions and were among the first systematic publications of ancient buildings. Both works were of great influence on neoclassical architecture in Britain, Continental Europe and America. From 1753 to 1756, Wood was the tutor and travelling companion (or Bear-leader as such men were known at the time) of the young Duke of Bridgewater, the richest peer in England, in making the Grand Tour. In 1756 he was appointed Under Secretary to the Secretary of State for the Southern Department, who was initially Pitt the Elder. It was to Wood that Granville famously quoted an appropriate passage from Homer's Iliad as he signed the Treaty of Paris on his deathbed in 1763 (Wood published an essay on Homer in 1765, which stated that true knowledge can come only after one has had an opportunity to evaluate one's own society in relation to others). In 1764, following the instructions of Secretary of State Halifax, Wood acted under a general warrant to seize the papers of John Wilkes, who subsequently won damages of £1000 from him for trespass.

In 1761 Wood was elected Member of Parliament for the Duke of Bridgewater's pocket borough of Brackley in Northamptonshire, which he continued to represent until his death. He was also Master of the Revels in Ireland, and at one point it was rumoured that he would be appointed Secretary to the Lord-Lieutenant of Ireland, but the Lord Lieutenant objected to Wood's "public and private character" as well as his "mean birth", and the appointment was never made. After his death on 9 September 1771, Wood was buried near his home in Putney at Putney Old Burial Ground, in a white marble sarcophagus engraved with an epitaph written by Horace Walpole. He had married Ann, the daughter of Thomas Skottowe, with whom he had two sons and a daughter. One son Robert was also an MP.

== Writings ==
- Les ruines de Palmyre, autrement dite Tedmor, au desert. London (1753).
- The ruins of Palmyra; otherwise Tedmor in the desart. London (1753).
- Les Ruines de Balbec, autrement dite Heliopolis dans la Coelosyrie. London (1757).
- The ruins of Balbec, otherwise Heliopolis in Coelosyria. London (1757).
- An essay on the original genius of Homer. London (1769).

Parliament of Great Britain
Preceded by Marshe Dickinson; Sir William Moreton	Member of Parliament for Brackley; 1761–1771; With: Marshe Dickinson 1761–1765; Viscount Hinchingbrooke 1765–1768; William Egerton 1768–1771	Succeeded by William Egerton; Timothy Caswall
Court offices
Preceded by Francis Buller	Groom Porter; 1764–1765	Succeeded by George Paulet
