= Gordon Borrie, Baron Borrie =

British lawyer and politician (1931–2016)

The Right Honourable The Lord Borrie Kt QC FRSA
- Borrie in 2014

Member of the House of Lords
- Lord Temporal
- Life peerage 21 December 1995 – 30 September 2016

Personal details
- Born: 17 May 1924
- Died: 30 September 2016 (aged 85)

Gordon Johnson Borrie, Baron Borrie, Kt QC FRSA (13 March 1931 – 30 September 2016) was an English lawyer and Labour Party life peer.

Born in Croydon, he was educated at John Bright Grammar School, Llandudno, North Wales. A lawyer by training, he practised at the Bar before becoming a law lecturer. Knighted in the 1982 Birthday Honours, he was professor of law and dean of the faculty of law at Birmingham University and became a Queen's Counsel in 1986.

He was a bencher of the Middle Temple. As director general of fair trading, he was in charge of the Office of Fair Trading from 1976 to 1992. He chaired the Labour Party's Commission on Social Justice from 1992 to 1994 and was created a life peer as Baron Borrie, of Abbots Morton in the County of Hereford and Worcester on 21 December 1995.

He served on the Council of the Consumers' Association and has written on consumer law. He was also president of the Institute of Trading Standards from 1992 to 1996, and was chairman of the Direct Marketing Authority from 1997 to 2000.

Lord Borrie was the Advertising Standards Authority's chairman from January 2001 until 2007. He was a trustee of the Reform Club.

He twice stood unsuccessfully as a Labour candidate for the House of Commons: in Croydon North East at the 1955 general election and in Ilford South at the 1959 general election.

By investigating the division between brokers and jobbers at the London Stock Exchange while at the OFT, Borrie set in motion events which would lead to Big Bang in 1986.

By forcing breweries to sell their extensive pub estates, he is credited with increasing competition and diversity in the industry.
