= Julins Palmer =

Julins Palmer (died 1556) was an English Protestant martyr. His name Julins was apparently a form of Joscelin, and has been generally misspelt Julius.

== Early life ==
He was born in Warwickshire, at Coventry, but at an early age entered Magdalen College School, Oxford, where he was for some time a pupil of John Harley, afterwards Bishop of Hereford. He was the son of Roger Palmer, mercer or upholsterer, who was sheriff of Coventry in 1525 and mayor in 1533.

== Under Edward VI ==
Palmer then became clerk at Magdalen College, and graduated B.A. in March 1548; in 1549 he was elected fellow. In 1550 he was appointed reader in logic. He soon attracted notice by his uncompromising Roman Catholic opinions, and in 1552 was accused of having written libellous verses on the president, Walter Haddon. Palmer denied the charge, but attacked the reformers with such vehemence that his name was struck off the list of fellows before July. He then became a tutor in the household of Sir Francis Knollys.

== Under Mary I ==
On the accession of Mary Palmer was restored to his fellowship, but a perusal of Calvin's ‘Institutes’ began to unsettle his religious opinions, and his orthodoxy was further shaken by reading Peter Martyr's ‘Commentary on the First Epistle to the Corinthians’ and by witnessing the execution of Ridley and Latimer, which he strongly denounced. He now became as vehement a Protestant as he had before been Roman Catholic, absented himself from mass, and made a point of walking out whenever obnoxious ceremonies occurred in the church service. He avoided a second expulsion from his fellowship by voluntarily leaving Oxford, and obtained the grant of a mastership in Reading School. He was not long left in peace, for his study was searched by some of his enemies, and various anti-Roman catholic manuscripts discovered, including a poem called ‘Epicedium,’ written in answer to an epitaph on Gardiner by Peter Morwen. They threatened to inform against him unless he at once left Reading. Palmer sought shelter with his mother, who, after her husband's death, had retired to Eynsham, but she refused it on account of his heretical opinions. He now apparently obtained letters from the president of Magdalen, Arthur Cole, recommending him for a mastership in a school in Gloucestershire; but an incautious visit to Reading to secure his manuscripts and arrears of pay led to his arrest. He was brought before the mayor, Robert Bowyer, and then taken to Newbury. Here he was examined before the consistory of Dr. Jeffrey on 16 July 1556, and, after refusing to subscribe certain articles drawn up for him, was condemned to be burnt. The sentence was carried out on the following morning at the sandpits, which tradition identifies with some pits near the town on the Enborne road. Besides his answer to Morwen, John Strype attributes to Palmer various fugitive pieces, which were never printed and are not known to be extant.
