= Ysgol John Bright =

Location
- Maesdu Road; Llandudno, Conwy, LL30 1DF; Wales; 53°19′15″N 3°49′29″W

Information
- Established: 1896
- Founder: John Bright MP
- Local authority: Conwy
- Department for Education URN: 401684 Tables
- Ofsted: Reports
- Headteacher (Pennaeth): Hywel Parry
- Staff: 364
- Gender: Co-education
- Age: 11 to 19
- Enrolment: 1147 (2023)
- Website: https://www.johnbright.uk/

Ysgol John Bright is a secondary school on Maesdu Road, Llandudno in Conwy County Borough, Wales.

== History ==
=== Grammar school ===
It was founded with money and support from the social reformer John Bright, whose son died in Llandudno in 1864. Until 1969 the school was a selective grammar school known as John Bright Grammar School (JBGS).

The first John Bright school first opened in February 1896 in temporary premises – now the Risboro Hotel. It was bought for £567 and had 62 pupils. By 1905, there were nearly 80 pupils and 5 teachers. It had five classrooms and specialist rooms for cookery, music, art and woodwork, physics and science. The headmaster was J.M. Archer-Thomson, a leading Welsh mountaineer.

The school moved to a new site on Oxford Road in 1907 and remained on that site until 2004.

=== Comprehensive ===
It reopened in September 1969 as a comprehensive and with a new name – Ysgol John Bright. ("Ysgol" is Welsh for "school") The school serves the state secondary education sector in the Llandudno area and has around 1200 pupils.

In 1980 the school entered a team for the Top of the Form radio competition, with Anthony Griffiths, Sarah Norwood, Andrew Wilkinson and Gillian Carr. The first competition was recorded on Wednesday October 2, 1980 at Holywell High School (Ysgol Treffynnon), being broadcast on October 21, 1980. The school team won 68-56. The team competed on November 5, 1980 against Hazel Grove High School, broadcast on November 25, 1980, and lost 79-72.

The current headteacher is Hywel Parry. The Oxford Road buildings were demolished in 2004 and the site was redeveloped as an Asda store. It has not been revealed how much Asda paid for the site. New school buildings on Maesdu Road were opened in September 2004. They were built as part of a PFI project and a facilities management company handles caretaking, cleaning and catering. The cost was £20,000,000. As the new site had previously been a landfill and gasworks, the move was the subject of some controversy.

== Examinations ==
The school offers education for KS3, KS4 and Post-16 students. It offers GCSE, Entry Level examinations for KS4 and AS-level and A-level for Post-16 education.

== Notable former pupils ==
- Joey Jones, footballer, Liverpool defender.
- Neville Southall, footballer, Everton goalkeeper.
- Catfish and the Bottlemen, rock band.

=== John Bright Grammar School ===
- Sheila Collins OBE, British nurse and educationist.
- Norah Dunphy, first UK woman to graduate in architecture (1926) and work as a town planner
- Glyn Griffiths, flying ace with the Royal Air Force during the Second World War
- Keith Mason, astronomer, Chief Executive of the Science and Technology Facilities Council (STFC) of the United Kingdom from 2007 to 2011
- Andrew McNeillie, poet
- Sir Gareth Gwyn Roberts, 1958 Penmaenmawr, Physics, President of Wolfson College, Oxford University, UK
- Roger Roberts, Baron Roberts of Llandudno, former President of the Welsh Liberal Democrats and Methodist Minister
- Gordon Borrie, Baron Borrie, lawyer, evacuated to Llandudno during World War II
