= William Moreton =

English prelate

William Moreton (1641 – 21 November 1715) was an English prelate in the Church of Ireland who served as the Bishop of Meath from 1705 to 1716.

== Life ==
He was born in Chester in 1641, eldest son of Edward Moreton (1599–1665), prebendary of Chester. His father, son of William Moreton of Moreton, was educated at Eton and King's College, Cambridge, was incorporated at Oxford M.A. 1626 and D.D. 1636; was appointed vicar of Grinton, Yorkshire (1634); rector of Tattenhall, Cheshire, chaplain to Sir Thomas Coventry, lord keeper, and prebendary of Chester, all in 1637; and vicar of Sefton, Lancashire, in 1639. It appears that his property was sequestrated in 1645, and that he was nominated by Lord Byron a commissioner to superintend the capitulation of Chester to the parliamentary forces in January 1646. Restored to his benefices at the Restoration, he died at Chester on 28 February 1664–65, and was buried in Sefton Church, where a Latin inscription commemorates his equanimity under misfortune.

He matriculated at Christ Church, Oxford, on 5 December 1660. William graduated B.A. 19 February 1664, M.A. 21 March 1667, and B.D. 3 November 1674. In 1669, he became rector of Churchill, Worcestershire, and was also for some time chaplain to Aubrey Vere, earl of Oxford. In 1677, he accompanied James, duke of Ormonde, lord-lieutenant, to Ireland, as his chaplain; and on 12 December of that year was created D.D. of Oxford by special decree. A few days later, 22 December, he was appointed dean of Christ Church, Dublin, in which capacity Mant speaks of him as 'the vehement and pertinacious opponent of the Archbishop of Dublin's episcopal jurisdiction.'

On 13 February 1682, he was appointed to the see of Kildare, with the preceptory of Tully, and was consecrated in Christ Church, Dublin, on the 19th by the Archbishop of Armagh. The sermon, preached by Foley, bishop of Down and Connor, was published. Moreton was made a privy councillor of Ireland on 5 April 1682, and was created D.D. of Dublin in 1688; but when Tyrconnel held Ireland for James II he 'fled to England and there continued till that nation was settled.'

Some time after his return to Ireland, Moreton sent a petition to the Irish House of Commons, asking them to give power to the trustees of the Irish forfeitures, in accordance with the Irish Act of Settlement, to set out land forfeited in the rebellion in augmentation of his bishopric. In the preamble to this petition, it was stated that the revenue of the see of Kildare, though the second in Ireland, did not exceed £170 per annum. He was translated to the see of Meath on 18 September 1705, and was made a commissioner of the great seal by Queen Anne.

He died at Dublin on 21 November 1715, and was buried in Christ Church Cathedral on 24 November.

== Family ==
He married firstly Mary Atkins in the summer of 1682, and had a son Richard and a daughter Annabella, who married barrister William Taylor. He secondly married Mary Harman, with whom he had a further son, his successor William, and a daughter Mary, who married Lieutenant-Colonel Howard.
