= Norah Dunphy =

UK architect and town planner

- Other names: Norah Roberts
- Occupations: Architect and town planner
- Years active: 1926–1937

Norah Dunphy was the first woman to graduate with a degree in architecture in the UK, in 1926. She was employed as a town planner, the first woman in the UK in this role, and later taught planning.

== Career ==
Dunphy studied architecture at the University of Liverpool and was awarded a B. Arch. degree (RIBA Part 1), the first woman on the UK to achieve this. She subsequently studied Civic Design and gained a first-class Certificate in Civic Design. The head of the School of Architecture, Charles Herbert Reilly, was supportive of women studying architecture. After graduating she was appointed as a town planning assistant to the Tynemouth and North Shields Corporation in 1931. After marriage she changed to teaching planning.

== Personal life ==
Dunphy initially lived in Llandudno and attended John Bright School. She later married and was then called Norah Roberts.

== Legacy ==
The Norah Dunphy Gold Award for Architecture is made by the National Eisteddfod of Wales. Twenty-eight of her architectural drawings, made while she was a student and when employed in Tynemouth and North Shields, are held in the archives of University of Liverpool.
