= William Moreton (judge) =

English judge, Recorder of London and Member of Parliament

Sir William Moreton (c.1696 – 14 March 1763) of Little Moreton Hall, Cheshire was an English judge, Recorder of London and Member of Parliament.

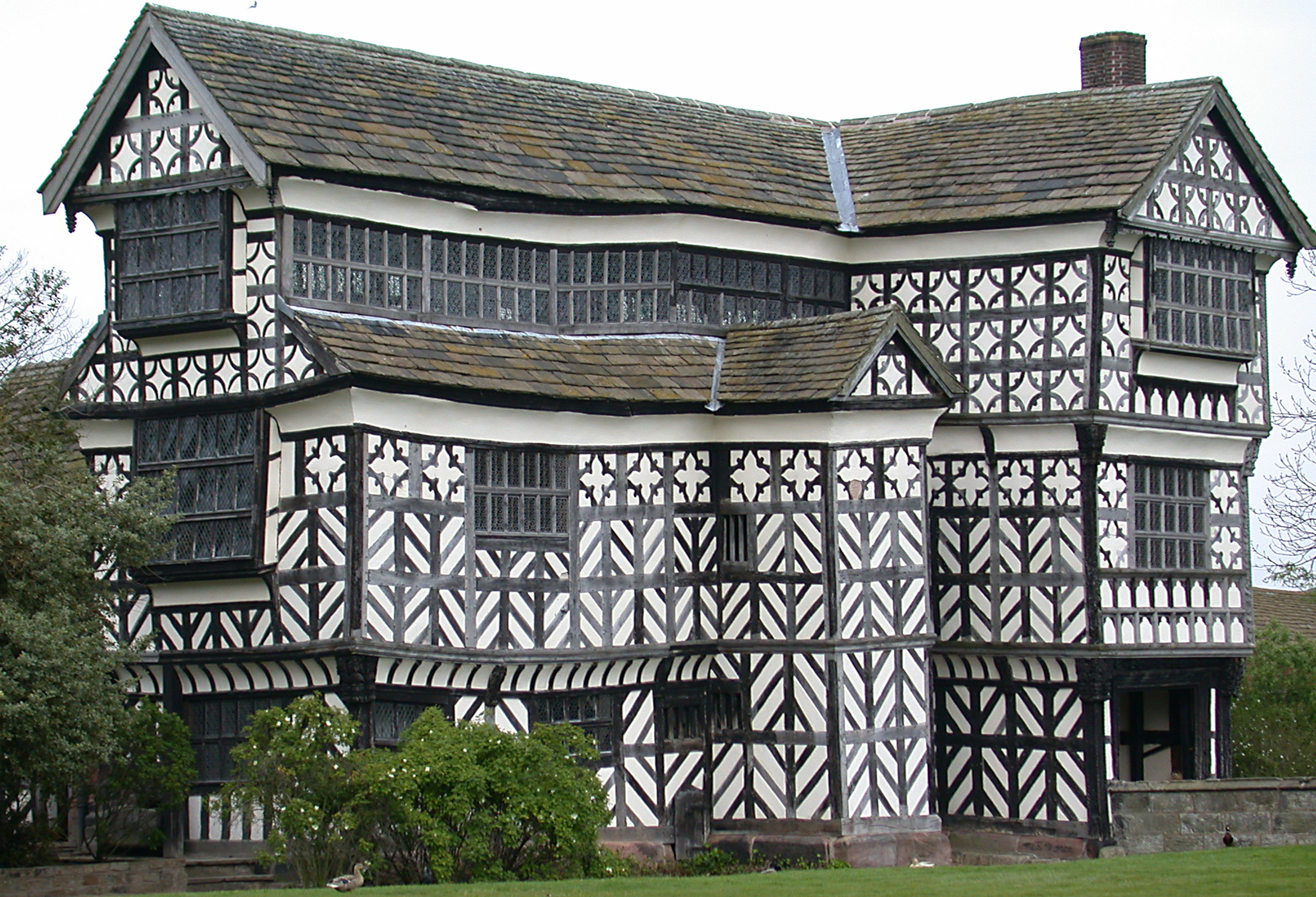
Little Moreton Hall

He was born the second son of the Rt. Rev. William Moreton, Bishop of Kildare (1681-1705) and Bishop of Meath (1705-16) but the first by his second wife Mary Harman. He was educated at Trinity College, Dublin (1710–14) and studied law at the Inner Temple (1714), where he was called to the bar in 1722.

He was appointed a Bencher at the Inner Temple in 1752, reader in 1758, and treasurer for 1760–1. Knighted on 19 September 1755, he served as Recorder of London from 1753 until his death.

In 1755 he was elected to Parliament to represent Brackley, sitting until 1761.

He died in 1763. He had married, in 1742, Jane, the widow of John Lawton of Lawton but left no children. His estate passed to the son of his half-sister, the Revd Richard Taylor, who thereupon adopted the name of Moreton.

Parliament of Great Britain
| Preceded by Marshe Dickinson; Thomas Humberston | Member of Parliament for Brackley; 1755–1761; With: Marshe Dickinson | Succeeded by Marshe Dickinson; Robert Wood |
