= Sheila Collins =

UK nurse and educationist (1921–2009)

Sheila Collins OBE FRCN
- Born: 28 August 1921; Conwy, Wales
- Died: 13 March 2009 (aged 87); Farnborough
- Spouse: Lilian Helen Margaret Collyer

Sheila Margaret Collins OBE FRCN (28 August 1921 – 13 March 2009) was a British nurse, writer and educationist. She was chair of the Royal College of Nursing's council.

== Life ==
Collins was born in 1921 in Conwy, Wales. She went to school at the John Bright Grammar School. She decided not to apply to university but after working as a trainee teacher at a local junior school she applied to train at the London Hospital in Whitechapel. She was influenced in her choice by the emerging likelihood of a war and her entry to the London Hospital was delayed by a month because of war being declared in 1939.

In 1953 she returned to the London Hospital as a tutor and she was appointed as Principal Tutor in 1960. She used her position to create an innovative approach to teaching nursing, but realising the value to learning both in the ward and the classroom. In 1965 she went to America and Canada funded by the British Red Cross Society to observe how teaching was taught in North America.

In 1970 she began to study with the Open University. All of her studies were made in her spare time and after four years she was awarded a Bachelor of Arts. She was made a Fellow of the Royal College of Nursing in 1977. Collins was a member of the Briggs Committee on Nursing.

In 1983 she and Edith Parker's "Introduction to Nursing" was published.

In 1987 she was chair of the editorial board who created "The Essentials of Nursing: An Introduction" when she was an associate lecturer at the University of Surrey.

In 1989 her study "Curriculum innovations in six English nursing schools collaborating with institutions of higher or advanced further education" was submitted for a master's degree, but the University of Surrey decided to award her a doctorate.

She had an interest in history and she wrote "The Royal London Hospital: a Brief History" and a history of the Royal London League of Nurses.

Collins died in 2009 in Farnborough. The Nursing Standard noted that she had a "profound influence on the development of nurse education and nursing history".

== Private life ==
She met Lilian Helen Margaret Collyer when they were both on a Royal College of Nursing course for tutors in 1949. They lived their lives together and entered into a civil partnership in 2007.
