= Haddon, Gauteng =

Haddon
- Location within Gauteng Location within South Africa
- Coordinates: 26.256875°S 28.033978°E
- Country: South Africa
- Province: Gauteng
- Municipality: City of Johannesburg
- Main Place: Johannesburg
- Established: 1919

Area
  - Total: 0.30 km^{2} (0.12 sq mi)

Population (2011)
  - Total: 2,271
  - Density: 7,600/km^{2} (20,000/sq mi)

Racial makeup (2011)
  - Black African: 49.3%
  - Coloured: 14.2%
  - Indian/Asian: 5.8%
  - White: 29.6%
  - Other: 1.1%

First languages (2011)
  - English: 40.4%
  - Afrikaans: 17.2%
  - Zulu: 14.3%
  - Sotho: 5.1%
  - Other: 23.1%
- Time zone: UTC+2 (SAST)
- Postal code (street): 2190

Haddon is a suburb of Johannesburg, South Africa. Located south of the CBD, it is located close to the larger suburb of Turffontein. It is located in Region F of the City of Johannesburg Metropolitan Municipality.

== History ==
Prior to the discovery of gold on the Witwatersrand in 1886, the suburb lay on land on one of the original farms called Turffontein. It became a suburb on 26 March 1919.
