= Drew Saunders (MP) =

Member of the Parliament of England

Drew Saunders (by 1525 – 1579), of Hillingdon, Middlesex, was an English Member of Parliament.

He represented Brackley in 1558.
