= Brackley (constituency) =

Parliamentary constituency in the United Kingdom, 1801–1832

- Former borough constituency for the House of Commons

1547–1832
- Seats: Two

Brackley was a parliamentary borough in Northamptonshire, which elected two Members of Parliament (MPs) to the House of Commons from 1547 until 1832, when the constituency was abolished by the Great Reform Act.

== History ==
The borough consisted of the town of Brackley, a market town where the main economic interests were making lace and footwear. In 1831, the population of the borough was 2,107, and the town contained 378 houses. While this by no means put it among the smallest of the rotten boroughs, it was barely the half the size which was eventually required to retain representation after 1832.

Brackley was a corporation borough, the right to vote having been restricted to the Mayor, 6 aldermen and 26 "burgesses" (the remaining members of the corporation), a total electorate of 33, in the reign of James II. The Mayor was appointed by the Lord of the manor, and the major local landowners or "patrons" had total control over the election of MPs. In the mid 18th century the Duke of Bridgewater was able to nominate both MPs; by the time of the Reform Act, the Earl of Bridgewater nominated to one seat and the Marquess of Stafford to the other.

Brackley lost both its MPs under the provisions of the Reform Act.

== Members of Parliament ==
=== 1547–1640 ===
Parliament	First member	Second member
1547	Henry Sidney	Francis Saunders
1553 (Mar)	Robert Saunders	?Francis Saunders
1553 (Oct)	Thomas Fermor	Robert Saunders
1554 (Apr)	Thomas Onley	Richard Ardern
1554 (Nov)	George Ferrers	Thomas Onley
1555	George Ferrers	Thomas Boughton
1558	Robert Saunders	Drew Saunders
1558–9	Sir Thomas Knyvet	Robert Saunders
1562–3	Christopher Yelverton	Richard Lucy, died and replaced 1566 by Edward Onley
1571	Thomas Catesby	Matthew Mantell
1572	Matthew Mantell	Thomas Onley
1584 (Oct)	James Croft	George Whitton
1586 (Oct)	James Croft	George Whitton
1588 (Oct)	Humphrey Davenport	Jerome Fermor
1593	Richard Bowle	Sidney Montagu
1597 (Sep)	Robert Spencer	Ranulph Crewe
1601 (Oct)	Edward Montagu, 1st Baron Montagu of Boughton	John Donne
1604	Sir Richard Spencer	William Lisle
1614	Sir William Spencer	Arthur Terringham
1621	Sir Thomas Wenman	Edward Spencer
1624	Sir Thomas Wenman	Edward Spencer
1625	Sir Thomas Wenman	Edward Spencer
1626	Sir John Hobart	John Crew
1628	Sir Thomas Wenman	John Curzon
1629–1640	No Parliaments summoned	

=== 1640–1832 ===
Year	First member	First party	Second member	Second party
November 1640	John Crew	Parliamentarian	Sir Martin Lister	Parliamentarian
December 1648	Both members excluded in Pride's Purge – seats vacant			
1653	Brackley was unrepresented in the Barebones Parliament and the First and Second Parliaments of the Protectorate			
January 1659	Thomas Crew		William Lisle	
May 1659	Unrepresented in the restored Rump			
April 1660	Sir Thomas Crew		William Lisle	
1661	Sir Thomas Crew		Robert Spencer	
February 1679	Sir Thomas Crew		William Lisle	
August 1679	Hon. Richard Wenman		Sir William Egerton	
1681	Hon. Richard Wenman		William Lisle	
1685	Hon. Richard Wenman		James Griffin	
1689	Hon. Richard Wenman		John Parkhurst	
1690	Sir William Egerton		John Blencowe	
1692	Harry Mordaunt		John Blencowe	
1695	Harry Mordaunt		Charles Egerton	
1698	Sir John Aubrey		Charles Egerton	
1701	Harry Mordaunt		Charles Egerton	
1702	John James		Charles Egerton	
May 1705	John Sidney		Charles Egerton	
November 1705	Harry Mordaunt		Charles Egerton	
1708	William Egerton		Charles Egerton	
1711	William Egerton		John Burgh	
1713	William Egerton		Paul Methuen	
1714	John Burgh		Henry Watkins	
1715	William Egerton		Sir Paul Methuen	
1733	Dr George Lee		Sir Paul Methuen	
1742	Sewallis Shirley		Sir Paul Methuen	
1747	Sewallis Shirley		Richard Lyttelton	
1754	Marshe Dickinson		Thomas Humberston	
1755	Marshe Dickinson		Sir William Moreton	
1761	Marshe Dickinson		Robert Wood	
1765	Viscount Hinchingbrooke	Tory	Robert Wood	
1768	William Egerton		Robert Wood	
1771	William Egerton		Timothy Caswall	
1780	John Egerton	Tory	Timothy Caswall	
1789	John Egerton	Tory	Samuel Haynes	
1802	John Egerton	Tory	Robert Haldane Bradshaw	Tory
1803	Anthony Henderson	Tory	Robert Haldane Bradshaw	Tory
1810	Henry Wrottesley	Tory	Robert Haldane Bradshaw	Tory
1825	James Bradshaw	Tory	Robert Haldane Bradshaw	Tory
1832	Constituency abolished			
