= Walter Haddon =

English civil lawyer (1515–1572)

Walter Haddon LL.D. (1515–1572) was an English civil lawyer, much involved in church and university affairs under Edward VI, Queen Mary, and Elizabeth I. He was a University of Cambridge humanist and reformer, and was highly reputed in his time as a Latinist. He sat as an MP during the reigns of Mary and Elizabeth. His controversial exchange with the Portuguese historian Jerónimo Osório attracted international attention partly on account of the scholarly reputations of the protagonists.

== Early life ==
Walter Haddon was the son of William Haddon and Dorothy Young, the daughter of John Young of Croome d'Abitot, Worcestershire. He was the maternal half-brother of Francis Saunders and the brother of James Haddon. Haddon was educated at Eton College under Richard Cox, and in 1533 he was elected from Eton to King's College, Cambridge. He declined an invitation to Cardinal College, at Oxford, and proceeded B.A. at Cambridge in 1537. He was one of the scholars who about this period attended the Greek lectures read in the university by Thomas Smith. He commenced M.A. in 1541, and read lectures on civil law for two or three years.

== Under Edward VI ==
He was created Doctor of both laws at Cambridge in 1549, and served the office of vice-chancellor in 1549–1550. A reformer in religion, with Matthew Parker, then master of Benet College, he acted as an executor of his friend Martin Bucer, and both delivered orations at his funeral in March 1551. He was appointed Regius Professor of civil law, in accordance with a petition from the university, drawn up by his friend Roger Ascham. Haddon and John Cheke were chiefly responsible for the reform of the ecclesiastical laws, prepared under Thomas Cranmer's superintendence, and with the advice of Peter Martyr, in accordance with an Act of Parliament of 1549. The Act directed that the scheme should be completed by 1552, but the work was not finished within the specified time. A bill introduced into the parliament of 1552 for the renewal of the commission was not carried, and Edward's death put an end to the scheme, but Haddon and Cheke's Reformatio Legum Ecclesiasticarum did eventually appear in print in 1571.

On the refusal of Stephen Gardiner, Master of Trinity Hall, Cambridge, to comply with the request of Edward Seymour, 1st Duke of Somerset, Lord Protector, to amalgamate the college with Clare Hall, the king in February 1552 appointed Haddon to the mastership. On 8 April 1552 he, Parker, Ralph Aynsworth, then master of Peterhouse, and Thomas Lever, master of St. John's College, Cambridge, were commissioned to settle a disputed claim to the mastership of Clare Hall. When Cheke was ill in 1552, he recommended Haddon to the king as his successor in the provostship of King's College.

At Michaelmas 1552 the king and council removed Owen Oglethorpe, President of Magdalen College, Oxford, who was opposed to further religious changes, and Haddon was appointed to succeed him. The fellows in vain petitioned the king against this breach of the college statutes. Oglethorpe, finding the council inflexible, made an arrangement with Haddon, and resigned on 27 September; Haddon was admitted President by royal mandate on 10 October. Haddon as President sold valuables from the college chapel. Some libellous verses against the president, affixed to various parts of the college, were attributed to Julins Palmer, who was expelled on the ground of "popish pranks".

== Under Mary ==
On Mary's accession, in August 1553 Haddon wrote some Latin verses congratulating Her Majesty, but on 27 August he obtained leave of absence from Magdalen for a month on urgent private affairs. The following day letters were received from the Queen commanding that all injunctions contrary to the founder's statutes issued since the death of Henry VIII should be abolished; Haddon having retired, Oglethorpe was re-elected president on 31 October.

A commission for Haddon's admission to practise as an advocate in the arches court of Canterbury was taken out on 9 May 1555. He was elected MP for Reigate in October that year. He was admitted a member of Gray's Inn in 1557 and was MP for Thetford, Norfolk, in the parliament which assembled 20 January 1558, for Poole in 1559 and for Warwick from 1563 to 1567.

In 1557 he translated into Latin a supplicatory letter to Pope Paul IV from the parliament of England, to dissuade him from revoking Cardinal Pole's authority as legate.

== Under Elizabeth ==
His sympathy with Protestantism had been displayed in a consolatory Latin poem addressed to the Princess Elizabeth on her afflictions. On her accession in 1559 he was in favour and was summoned to attend her at Hatfield. He congratulated her in Latin verse, and was immediately constituted one of the two Masters in Ordinary of the Court of Requests (until 1571), together with Thomas Seckford. In spite of his own Protestant opinions, he admired the learning of Bishop Cuthbert Tunstal, and composed the epitaph placed on his tomb when he died that year. On 20 June he was appointed one of the commissioners for the visitation of the University of Cambridge and the college of Eton; and on 18 September following the queen granted him a pension. He was in the commission for administering oaths to ecclesiastics (20 October 1559); was also one of the ecclesiastical commissioners; and received from his friend, Archbishop Parker, the office of judge of the Prerogative Court of Canterbury.

In 1560 a Latin prayer-book, prepared under the superintendence of Haddon, who took a former translation by Alexander Alesius as a model, was authorised by the queen's Letters Patent for the use of the colleges in both universities and those of Eton and Winchester. On 22 January 1561 he was one of the royal commissioners appointed to look at the order of lessons throughout the year, to cause new calendars to be printed, to provide remedies for the decay of churches, and to prescribe some good order for collegiate churches in the use of the Latin service. He was one of those recommended by Edmund Grindal in December 1561 for the provostship of Eton College, but the queen's choice was William Day. In June 1562 he and Parker, at the request of the senate, induced William Cecil to abandon his intention of resigning the chancellorship of the University of Cambridge.

In August 1564 Haddon accompanied the Queen to Cambridge, and determined the questions in law in the disputations in that faculty held in her presence. In the same year the queen granted him lands at the site of Wymondham Abbey, Norfolk. He was at Bruges in 1565 and 1566 with Anthony Browne, 1st Viscount Montagu and Nicholas Wotton, in negotiations for restoring the commercial relations between England and the Netherlands. In November 1566 he was a member of the joint committee of both houses of parliament appointed to petition the queen about her marriage.

== Controversy with Osório ==
In 1563 Jerónimo Osório, a Portuguese priest known as a historian, published in French and Latin an epistle to Queen Elizabeth, exhorting her to return to the communion of the Catholic Church. Haddon, by direction of the government, wrote an answer, which was printed at Paris in 1563 through the agency of Sir Thomas Smith, the English ambassador. This polemical exchange has been called the most famous religious controversy of the second half of the sixteenth century.

Osório, now bishop of Silves, published a reply in 1567. Haddon began a rejoinder, but this was left unfinished at the time of his death, and it was ultimately completed and published by John Foxe. There appeared, probably at Antwerp, without date, Chorus alternatim canentium, a satire in verse on the controversy between Haddon and Osório, attached to a caricature in which Haddon, Bucer, and Pietro Martire Vermigli are represented as dogs drawing a car on which Osório is seated in triumph.

According to Edward Nares, English Jesuits at Leuven sought to deter Haddon from proceeding with his second confutation of Osório, by intimidation; Nares claimed wrongly that Haddon died in Flanders, and that this had raised suspicions of foul play. Similar claims are in the biography of John Foxe published in the 1840s by George Townsend (1788–1857).

== Death and family ==
Haddon died in London on 21 January 1572, and was buried on 25 January at Christ Church, Newgate Street. Until the Great Fire of London, there was a monument to his memory, with a Latin inscription preserved by Weever. So states the old D.N.B., but the verses recorded by Weever over the name of Walter Haddon are in Weever's entry for St. Anne's, Aldersgate, and are an Epigram reflecting on the dualities of God and Satan, Life and Death, Heaven and Hell.

He married, first, Margaret, daughter of Sir John Clere of Ormesby, Norfolk, by whom he had a son, Clere Haddon, who was drowned in the river Cam, probably in 1571; and secondly Anne, daughter of Sir Henry Sutton, who survived him and remarried Sir Henry Cobham, whom she also survived.

== Notes ==
Academic offices
Preceded by Stephen Gardiner	Master of Trinity Hall, Cambridge; 1549–1552	Succeeded by William Mowse
Preceded by Matthew Parker	Vice-Chancellor of the University of Cambridge; 1549–1550	Succeeded by John Madew
Preceded by Owen Oglethorpe	President of Magdalen College, Oxford; 1552–1553	Succeeded by Owen Oglethorpe
