= Sid Hadden =

English cricketer

Personal information
- Full name: Sidney Hadden
- Born: 26 August 1877; Hastings, Sussex, England
- Died: 2 November 1934 (aged 57); Whipps Cross, Essex, England
- Batting: Unknown
- Role: Wicket-keeper

Domestic team information
- Years: Team
- 1912 & 1920: Essex

Career statistics
Competition	First-class
Matches	6
Runs scored	29
Batting average	9.66
100s/50s	–/–
Top score	17*
Balls bowled	–
Wickets	–
Bowling average	–
5 wickets in innings	–
10 wickets in match	–
Best bowling	–
Catches/stumpings	5/1
- Source: Cricinfo, 11 October 2011

Sidney Hadden (26 August 1877 – 2 November 1934) was an English cricketer. Hadden's batting style is unknown, but it is known he fielded as a wicket-keeper. He was born at Hastings, Sussex.

He made his first-class debut for Essex against Derbyshire in the 1912 County Championship. He made three further first-class appearances in 1912, following World War I he made two further appearances for Essex in the 1920 County Championship against Gloucestershire and Middlesex. In his total of six first-class appearances, he scored 29 runs at an average of 9.66, with a high score of 17 not out. Behind the stumps he took 5 catches and made a single stumping.

Hadden died at Whipps Cross, Essex on 2 November 1934.
