= Oriwa Tahupotiki Haddon =

Oriwa Tahupotiki Haddon (7 November 1898–17 June 1958) was a New Zealand Methodist minister, pharmacist, artist, cartoonist and broadcaster. Of Māori descent, he identified with the Ngati Ruanui iwi. He was born in Waitotara, Wanganui, New Zealand on 7 November 1898.

Haddon's cartoons were published in the New Zealand Artists' Annual in the 1930s. His cartoons of Maori were those of an 'insider', and 'laughed at Maori in a gentler fashion than his contemporaries'.
