= James Haddon =

English reforming divine

James Haddon (fl. 1556) was an English reforming divine.

== Life ==
Haddon, brother of Walter Haddon and half-brother of Francis Saunders, proceeded B.A. in 1541 and M.A. in 1544 at Cambridge, and was one of the original fellows of Trinity College, Cambridge, 1546. In March 1550-1 he became a licensed preacher, and about the same time was chaplain to the Duke of Suffolk, and tutor to his daughter, Lady Jane Grey. Details of the household of his patron are in his letters to Heinrich Bullinger.

In August 1552 Haddon was given a prebend in Westminster Abbey, and in October became dean of Exeter, though the patent was not signed until 8 January in the following year. He left Suffolk's household with regret. He preached before the court in Lent 1553, when, as John Knox relates, "he most learnedly opened the causes of the bypast plagues, affirming that worse were to follow unless repentance should shortly be found".

On the accession of Mary I he was one of the six champions in the convocation of October 1553 who maintained the cause of the Reformation in five days' disputation on the real presence. In the long contest Haddon took on Thomas Watson.

In 1554 Haddon left England with a letter to Bullinger from the imprisoned John Hooper, in which Hooper highly commended him. He went, however, not to Zurich, but to Strasbourg, and forwarded Hooper's letter to Bullinger. To Bullinger he continued to write from Strasburg for two or three years down to March 1556. He complains of the poverty to which he was reduced in exile.

The date of Haddon's death is unknown. His epitaph was written by his brother Walter. His name is omitted by Peter Le Neve in the list of Deans of Exeter, and he may perhaps never have entered upon that dignity. Among manuscripts preserved at Corpus Christi College, Cambridge, is a letter De Matrimonio addressed to him, probably by Martin Bucer.
