= Francis Saunders =

16th-century English politician

Francis Saunders (1513/14–1585), of Welford, Northamptonshire, was an English politician.

== Family ==
Saunders was the son of William Saunders and Dorothy née Young, a daughter of John Young of Croome D'Abitot, Worcestershire. Saunders was the half-brother of the Master of Requests Walter Haddon, and of the reforming cleric James Haddon. He was educated at the Middle Temple. His first marriage was to Elizabeth Carew, a daughter of George Carew, probably of Bury St. Edmunds, Suffolk. They had two sons and a daughter. His second marriage was to Helen Chaloner, daughter of Roger Chaloner of London and the widow of Thomas Farnham of Stoughton and Quorndon, Leicestershire; they probably had one son. His third marriage was to Frances née Pope, with whom he had one son and four daughters.

== Career ==
He was a Member (MP) of the Parliament of England for Brackley in 1547 and March 1553.
