= Susan Hadden =

Susan G. Hadden (June 4, 1944 – January 15, 1995) was a Professor in the Lyndon Baines Johnson School of Public Affairs and the Center for Asian Studies at the University of Texas at Austin, United States.

== Biography ==
Hadden, a native Texan, was educated at Radcliffe College where she completed a B.A. cum laude, studying Sanskrit under Daniel Ingalls. She was a classmate of Bimal Krishna Matilal, and often said that Ingalls simultaneously had the best and worst students of his entire career in the same room. Her interest in India was interrupted by that of public policy. She changed direction and went on to the University of Chicago where she completed her M.A. and Ph.D. in Political Science.

Hadden was an expert in telecommunications policy, on environmental policy, citizen participation in the formulation of policy, and policies relating to human health risks. She was regularly asked by state and local governments to formulate policies in these fields. She was repeatedly called to Washington, D.C. to testify before the House and Senate Committees on public policy matters, and advised then Vice President Al Gore on policies relating to public access to the Internet. In recognition of her contributions to the field of public response to science-related social controversies, she was elected a Fellow of the American Association for the Advancement of Science in February 1993.

Despite her work on public policy, Hadden retained her youthful interest in India. She wrote about environmental policy in India, traveled to the subcontinent regularly, and was active among the community of scholars at the University of Texas who study India. Her interests expanded beyond contemporary affairs to diverse matters such as art history and political science.

On January 15, 1995, she was killed by bandits while on her way to visit the temple complex at Banteay Srei in Cambodia with her husband. The trip was a 50th birthday present from her husband, Jim, who was seriously injured in the attack. They had two children, James and Lucy.
