= William Lisle =

English lawyer, landowner and politician

William Lisle (1632 – 12 July 1716) was an English lawyer, landowner and politician who sat in the House of Commons from 1659 to 1681.

Lisle was the eldest son of Tobias Lisle, Grocer of Cannon Street, London and Saffron Hill and his wife Susan Trist daughter of Richard Trist of Maidford, Northamptonshire. He was admitted at Middle Temple in 1650 and at Magdalen College, Oxford in 1651. He was called to the bar succeeded to the estates of his father in 1659. Also in 1659, he was elected Member of Parliament for Brackley in the Third Protectorate Parliament. He was re-elected MP for Brackley in 1660 for the Convention Parliament. In 1662 he was a lieutenant in the volunteer cavalry for Northamptonshire and became captain of the militia in 1663. In 1665 he succeeded to the estates of his uncle William Lisle at Evenley. In the same year he was Master in Chancery and became commissioner for assessment for Northamptonshire until 1680. He was colonel of the militia from 1673 to before 1680. In 1679 he was elected MP for Brackley again. He was also elected MP for Brackley in 1681. He was commissioner for assessment from 1689 to 1890 and became J.P. for Northamptonshire from 1689 until his death.

Lisle died at the age of 84 and was buried at Evenley.

Lisle married Elizabeth Aylworth, daughter of John Aylworth of the Middle Temple and Polsloe, Devon on 9 November 1661 and had five sons and five daughters.
