= Haddon (given name) =

Haddon is a masculine given name. Notable people with the name include:

- Haddon Donald (1917–2018), New Zealand former soldier, businessman and politician
- Haddon King (1905–1990), Australian geologist
- Haddon Mason (1898–1966), British film actor
- Haddon Robinson (1931–2017), American evangelical preacher and professor
- Haddon Storey (born 1930), Australian politician
- Haddon Sundblom (1899–1976), American artist
- Charles Haddon Spurgeon (1834–1892), British preacher
