= Haddon Hall (Cincinnati, Ohio) =

- U.S. National Register of Historic Places
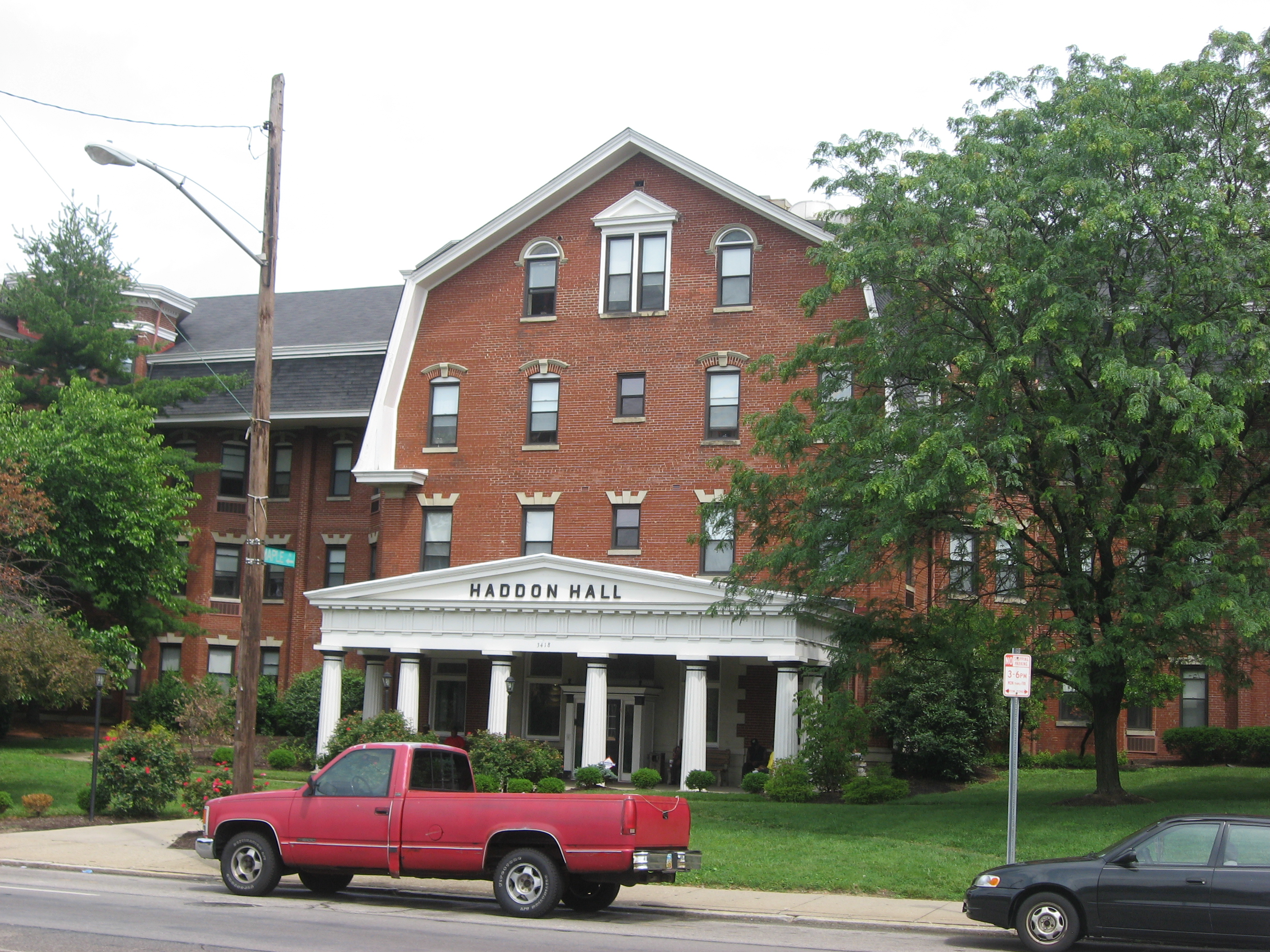
- One of the entrance gables

- Location within Ohio Location within the United States
- Location: 3418 Reading Road, Cincinnati, Ohio
- Coordinates: 39°8′30″N 84°29′32″W
- Area: 1.7 acres (0.69 ha)
- Built: 1909
- Architect: Joseph G. Steinkamp and Bros.; Thomas Emery's Sons
- Architectural style: Dutch Colonial Revival
- NRHP reference No.: 82003582
- Added to NRHP: July 22, 1982

Haddon Hall is a historic apartment building in Cincinnati, Ohio, United States. Constructed in the early 1900s, it has been declared a historic site.

One of the area's better Dutch Colonial Revival buildings, Haddon Hall was built by Thomas Emery's Sons (a real estate agency) according to a design by architect Joseph G. Steinkamp. In the 1890s and 1900s, Emery's became the first company in the Cincinnati metropolitan area engaged in the construction of apartment buildings, and Haddon is typical of their construction.

Haddon Hall is built of wood and brick; the building rests on a stone foundation and has other elements of wood and stone. Its walls are brick with wooden elements on the outside; the stone and wooden details are found largely around the entrances and the Doric-style capital on the entrance columns respectively. Four stories tall, the building is constructed in the Dutch Colonial Revival style and features that style's characteristic gambrel roof; Palladian windows are placed in the ends of the fourth floor, and windows on all floors feature detailed stone lintels. Access to the building is provided primarily by a single ground-floor entrance with a portico.

In 1982, Haddon Hall was listed on the National Register of Historic Places, qualifying both because of its architecture and its place in local history.
