= Arthur Langan Haddon =

Arthur Langan Haddon (3 October 1895 – 17 December 1961) was a New Zealand Church of Christ minister, theological college principal, writer and ecumenical leader. He was born in Goulburn, New South Wales, Australia on 3 October 1895.

In 1953, Haddon was awarded the Queen Elizabeth II Coronation Medal.
