= Arthur Trevor Haddon =

British painter (1864–1941)

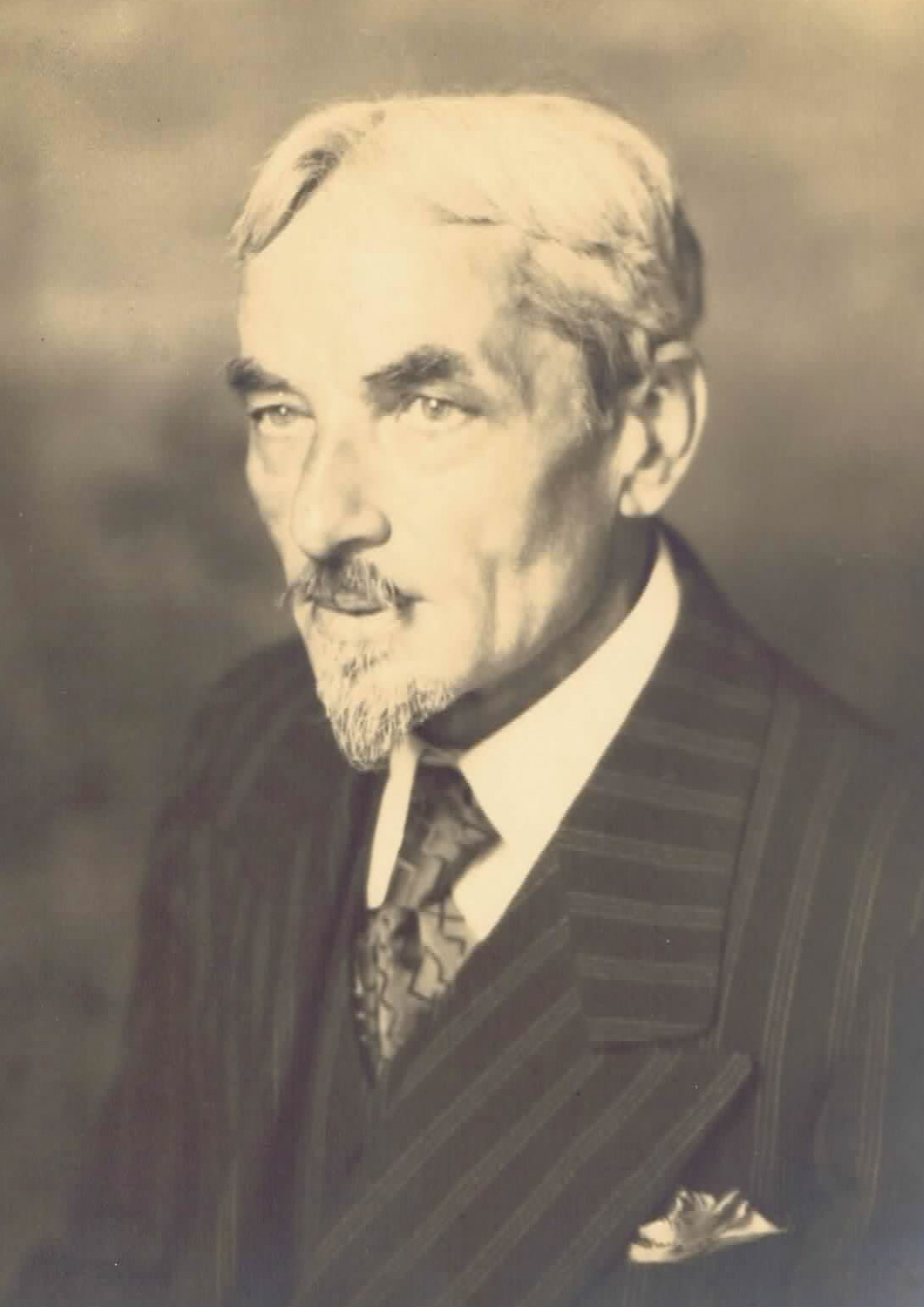
- Born: 12 August 1864; Barnet, London, England
- Died: 13 December 1941 (aged 77); Cambridge, England
- Education: Slade School of Fine Art; Hubert von Herkomer (18880-90)
- Known for: Portrait Painter, Venetian & Spanish Landscapes
- Movement: Orientalist
- Spouse: Emily Blanche Edith Richardson (Olivia)
- Elected: RBA

Arthur Trevor Haddon (12 August 1864 – 13 December 1941), also known as Trevor Haddon, was a British painter and illustrator.

== Life and career ==
Arthur Trevor Haddon was born on 2 August 1864 at Barnet, London. He was the younger son of John Haddon, The owner of a printing firm in London and was educated at local schools. He showed an early promise in art and his post- school art education was very thorough. His Mother, under the nom de plume Caroline Hadley was the authoress of a number of books for children.

He won a scholarship to the prestigious Slade School of Fine Art and enrolled in 1883. worth £50 per year. There, he studied under Alphonse Legros.

There in 1885 he won the Landscape prize and the Medal for painting from life.

Leaving the Slade he spent a year travelling in Spain . In October 1888 he joined The Herkomer School in Bushey. He studied with Hubert von Herkomer from 1888 to 1890.

By now he was an accomplished artist and in 1889 he exhibited Landscapes of Antwerp and Toledo in London Galleries. Trevor likely came to Bushey to progress his portraiture under Herkomer.

In 1890 he exhibited his portrait of Miss Horniman at the Royal Academy. Other Portraits followed including a pencil portrait of Herkomer, which hangs in the British Museum.

In 1892 he was elected a Fellow of the Herkomer School & in 1893 he was elected to the council which governed the school.He served a two-year term on the council until he moved away. He had spent five years in the Bushey artist community. His addresses were; Vine Cottage (c. 1889–1891), 18 George Street, Westminster ( 1892), South Hill House, Eastcote, Pinner Middx (1893 -1894)

It is very likely he travelled to Bavaria with Herkomer in the summer vacations since he exhibited landscapes associated with Landsberg.

Meanwhile, in 1892 he had married Emily Blanch Edith Richardson ( Olivia) and in 1893 had a son Hubert Collingwood (Colin), in 1895 a daughter Barbara Joyce, in 1897 a second son Geoffrey, and finally in 1902 another daughter Gertrude Juliet.

By this time he had moved to 8 Marius Road, Upper Tooting.

In 1896 he was elected a member of The Royal Society of British Artists, becoming a life member in 1922.

It was from portraiture that he apparently earned his living

........to be continued;

although he lived primarily in London and Cambridge, Haddon travelled to Rome, Madrid, Venice, California, South America, Hawaii, and Asia. He died in Cambridge on 13 December 1941, at age 77.

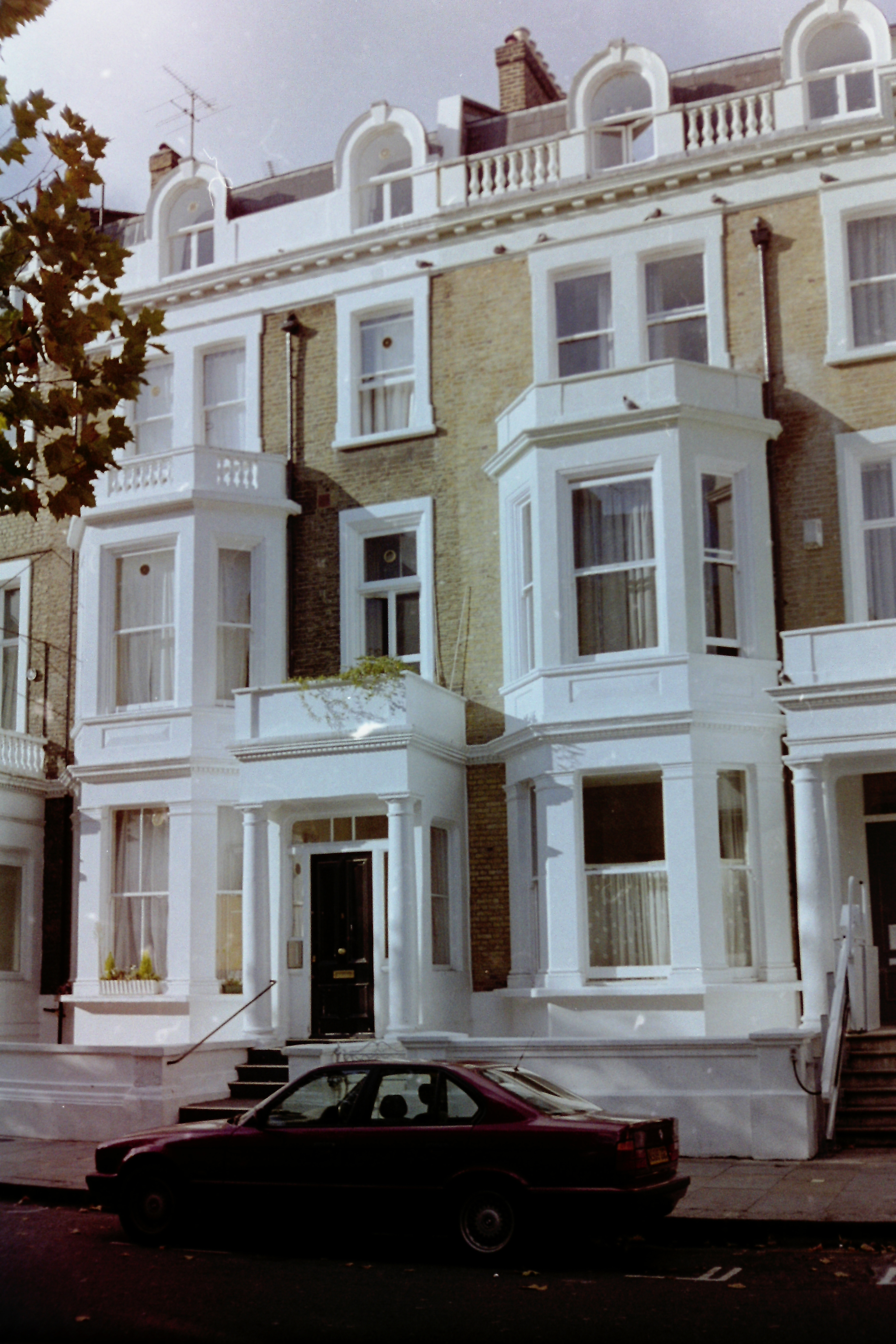
Penywern Road

== Work ==
Haddon was both a painter and illustrator.

=== Selected paintings ===
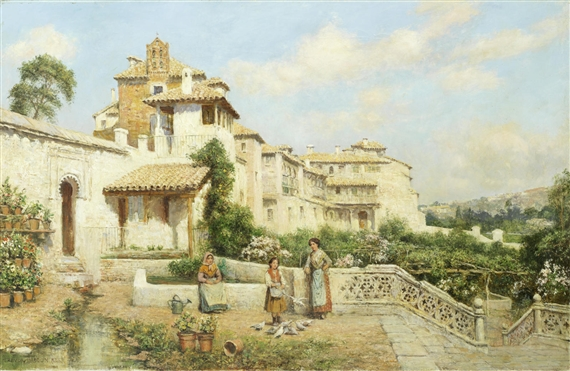
House in Toledo

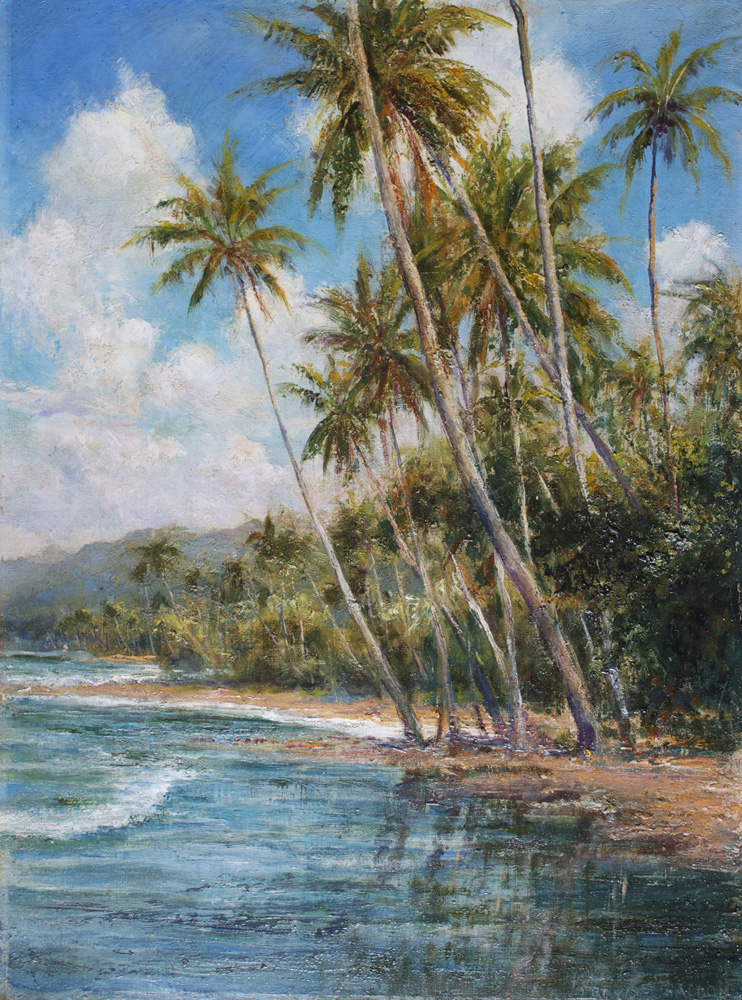
Palm Fringed Shore, c. 1826

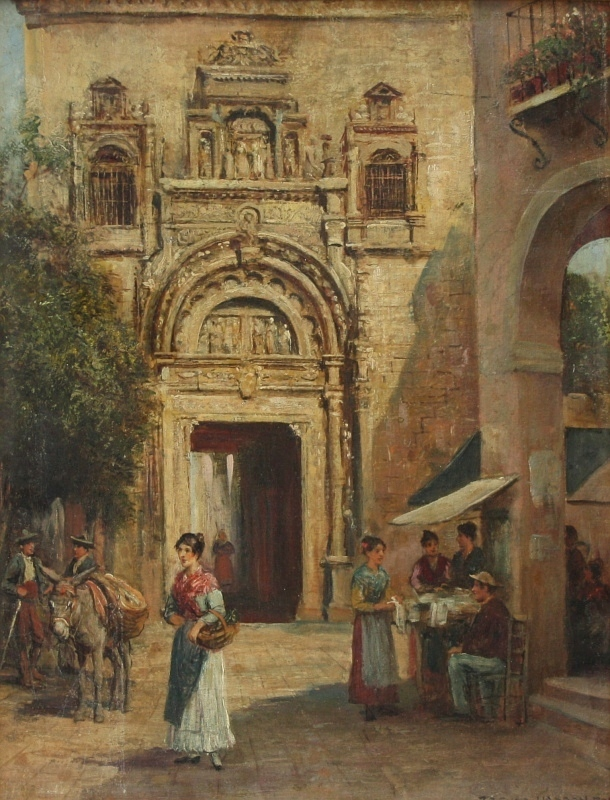
Spanish Streetscape, date unknown

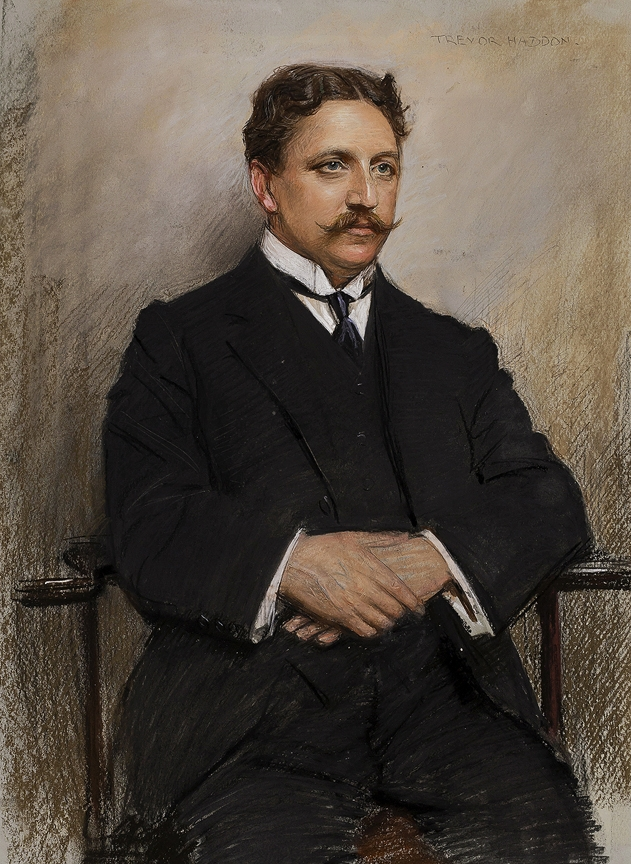
Pastel portrait of Herman Finck (1939)

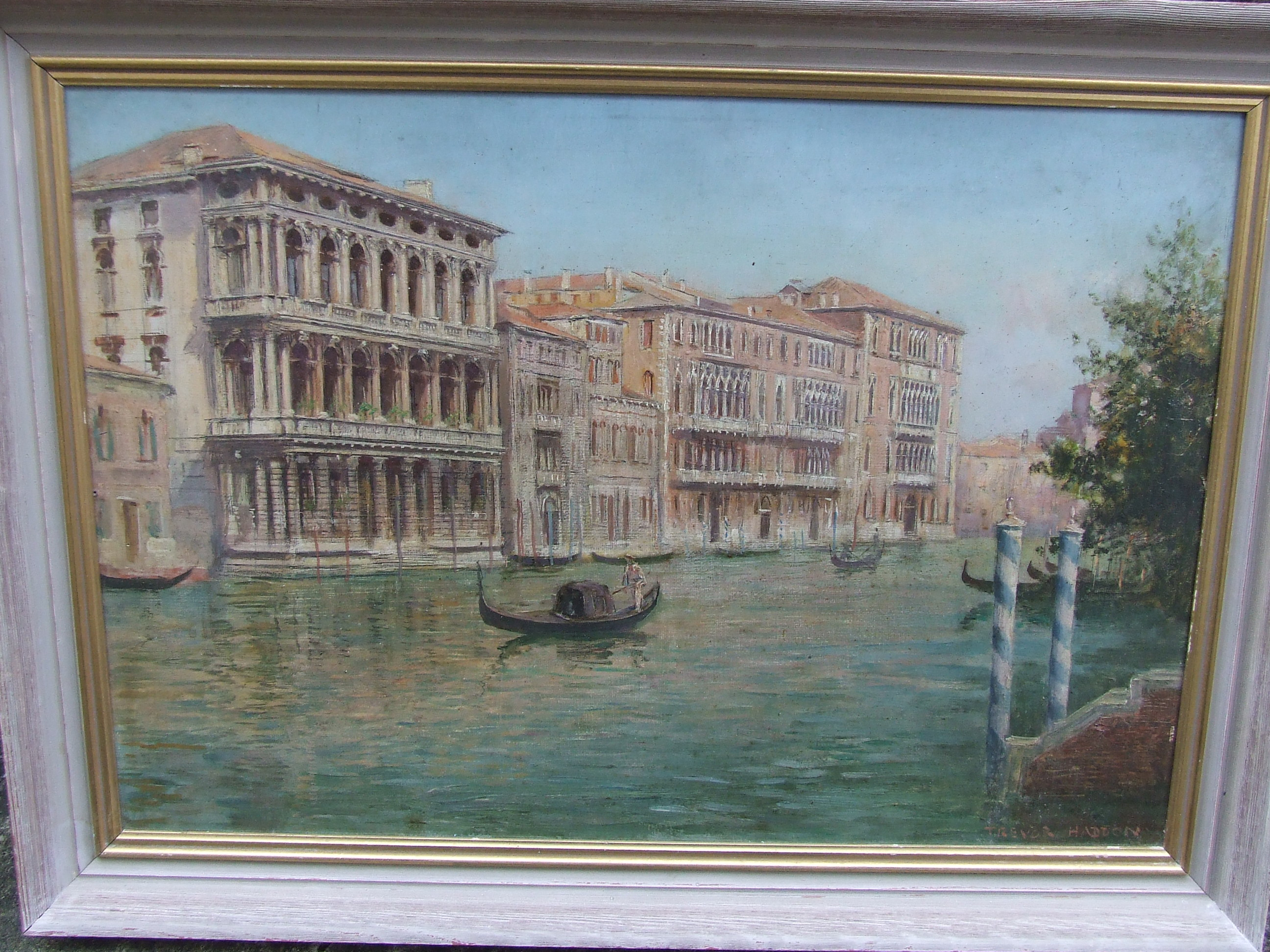
Venice

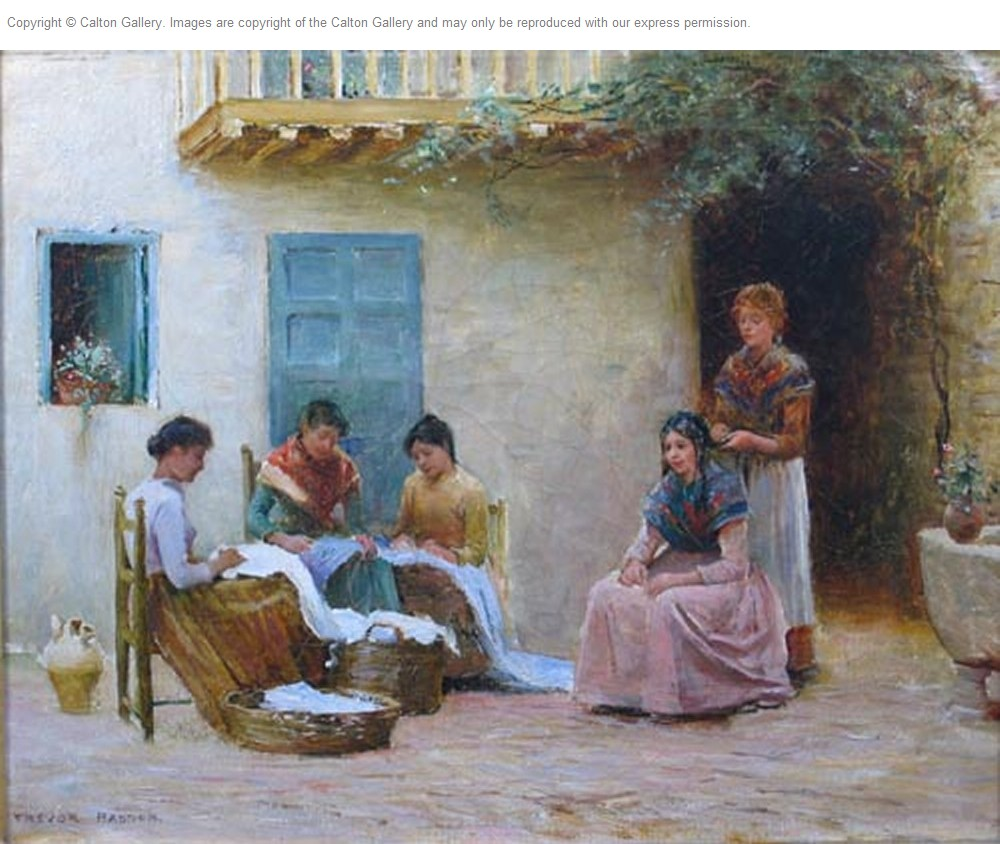
Washerwomen, Spain

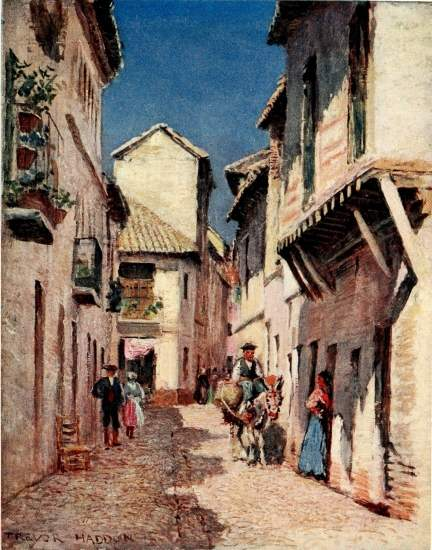
Cordoba

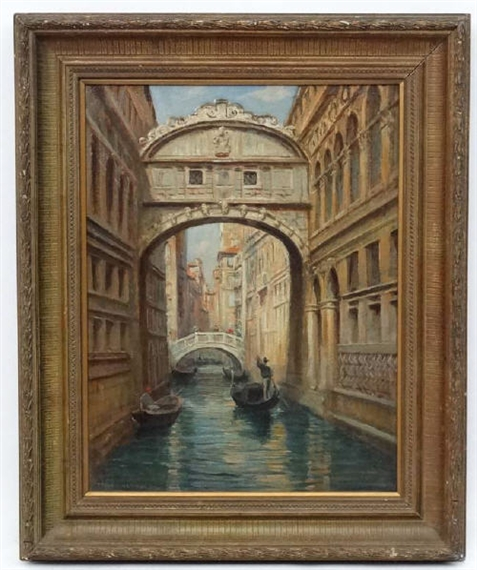
Bridge of Sighs, Venice

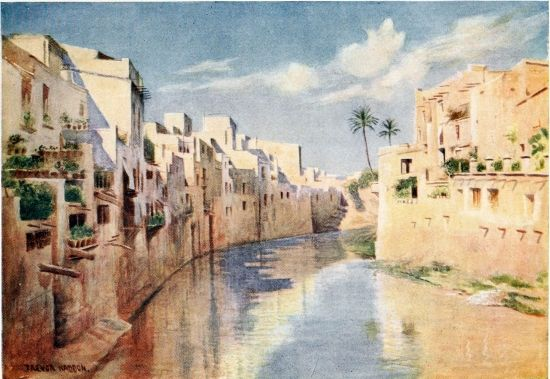
River Sigura

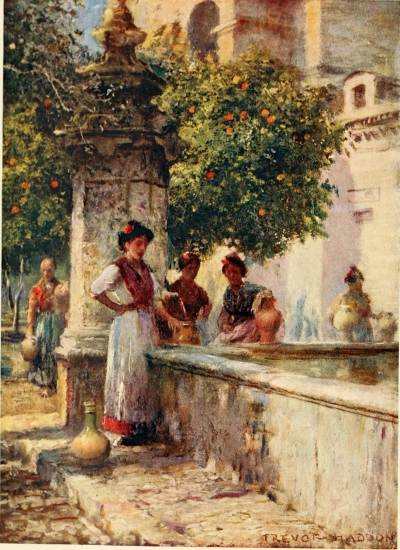
Women at the fountain, Cordoba

=== Illustrations in publications ===
Haddon illustrated the following works:

- The Comet London & Brighton Coach, John Haddon & Co
- The Snow Garden, Longman Green
- Browne, Edith A., Peeps at Many Lands: Spain, with twelve full-page illustrations in colour by Trevor Haddon and Edgar T. A. Wigram, London: Adam & Charles Black, 1910
- Calvert, Albert Frederick, Granada Present and Bygone, (illustrations by Trevor Haddon), J. M. Dent, London, 1908
- Calvert, Albert Frederick, Southern Spain: Painted By Trevor Haddon, A. & C. Black, Ltd., London, 1908
- Gould, Baring, A Book of the Rhine from Cleve to Mainz. With eight Illustrations in Colour by Trevor Haddon, London, Methuen 1906
- Nye, G.H.F, Our Island Home (8 illustrations by Trevor Haddon), Bemrose & Sons, Limited, London, c. 1898
- Okey, Thomas, The Old Venetian Palaces and Old Venetian Folk. With Fifty Coloured and Other Illustrations by Trevor Haddon, London. J. M. Dent & Co. 1907
- Thirlmere, Rowland, Letters from Catalonia and other parts of Spain (illustrations by Trevor Haddon), Hutchinson & Co., London, 1905

== See also ==
- List of Orientalist artists
- Orientalism
