= Andy Saunders (military history writer) =

Andy Saunders (Andrew Roy Saunders) is an English author and researcher from East Sussex who specializes in military aviation history with particular emphasis on the Battle of Britain and the air war over north-west Europe between 1939 and 1945.

He regularly contributes to the world's aviation press on military history topics and has also written for national newspapers, including "The Mail on Sunday". He is a former editor of Britain at War magazine, published by Lincolnshire-based Key Publishing.

He was also a programme consultant for the Discovery History series "War Digs With Harry Harris" and is currently involved in a number of projected television documentaries for various production companies working as contributor, researcher or consultant.

In 2001, he pleaded guilty to an offence under the Protection of Military Remains Act after recovering the aircraft of Flying Officer George Edward Kosh, a Hawker Tempest which crashed in 1944 in East Sussex, without a licence. He was given a one-year conditional discharge after the court heard he had committed a technical offence only which related to going ahead with the excavation of the wreckage a month before the appropriate Ministry of Defence licence came into effect. The licence had mistakenly been post dated by the MOD. In 2005 he was the principal contributor and consultant for the Channel 4 documentary "Who Downed Douglas Bader" (Wildfire TV) and more recently has had input to BBC Timewatch programmes (including "Aces Falling") and to various BBC "Inside Out" programmes as well as "The One Show", and "Fake Britain".

Many of his written works are published by Grub Street of London, although he has also had one of his titles published by the prestigious New York publisher, Random House.

He has been active in military aircraft preservation and recovery for more than forty years, including the recovery from India of two World War One bombers for preservation and flight in the UK as well as the wrecks of Gloster Gladiators from Norwegian mountains for UK museum restoration and display.

He is the founder of the Tangmere Military Aviation Museum.

== Published work ==
- Battle over Sussex (Middleton Press 1989)
- Blitz over Sussex (Middleton Press 1990)
- Bombers over Sussex (Middleton Press 1991)
- Little Friends (Random House 1991)
- RAF Tangmere in old photographs (Allan Sutton, 1992)
- Bognor at War (Middleton Press 1995)
- RAF Tangmere Revisited (Sutton 1998)
- No.43 ‘Fighting Cocks’ Squadron (Osprey Books 2003)
- Jane, A Pin-Up at War (Pen & Sword 2004)
- Bader's last fight : an in-depth investigation of a great WWII mystery (Grub Street 2007)
- Mannock VC (Grub Street 2009)
- Finding the Foe: outstanding Luftwaffe mysteries of the Battle of Britain and beyond investigated and solved (Grub Street 2009)
- Finding The Foe (Grub Street 2010)
- Convoy Peewit (Grub Street 2010)
- Spitfire MK.I P9374 (Grub Street 2011)
- Finding the fallen : outstanding aircrew mysteries from the First World War to Desert Storm investigated and solved (Grub Street 2011)
- Stuka Attack (Grub Street 2012)
- Arrival of Eagles (Grub Street 2014)
- DH9 – Jewels of the Maharaja's Palace (Grub Street 2012)
- Sopwith Pup Re-Creation (Grub Street 2015)
- Luftwaffe Bombers in The Battle of Britain (Pen + Sword 2014)
- Aircraft Salvage in The Battle of Britain + Blitz (Pen + Sword 2014)

== Programmes ==
- Requiem for an Airfield (BBC 1984)
- Missing – No Known Grave (BBC 1980)
- Time Team (Ch 4 2000)
- Who Downed Douglas Bader (Ch 4 2005)
- Aces Falling – Timewatch (BBC 2009)
- Dig 1940 (BBC 2010)
- Battle of Britain Uncovered (BBC 2010)
- Wartime Secrets (Discovery TV 2010)
- The One Show (BBC 2010)
- The Sheffield Blitz (BBC 2010)
- BBC Inside Out: Plot to Kidnap Hitler (South East 2010)
- BBC Inside Out: Remembered With Honour? (South 2011)
- War Digs With Harry Harris (Discovery History 2011/2012)
- The Forgotten Blitz (BBC Bristol 2011)

== General references ==
- Mannock VC: http://www.grubstreet.co.uk/products/view/84/mannock-the-life-and-death-of-major-edward-mannock-vc-dso-mc-raf/
