= Thomas Norris (died 1599) =

English soldier, made Lord President of Munster

Sir Thomas Norris (1556–1599) was an English soldier. He sat in the Irish House of Commons, and was made Lord President of Munster in Ireland. His last name is sometimes spelt Norreys.

== Family ==
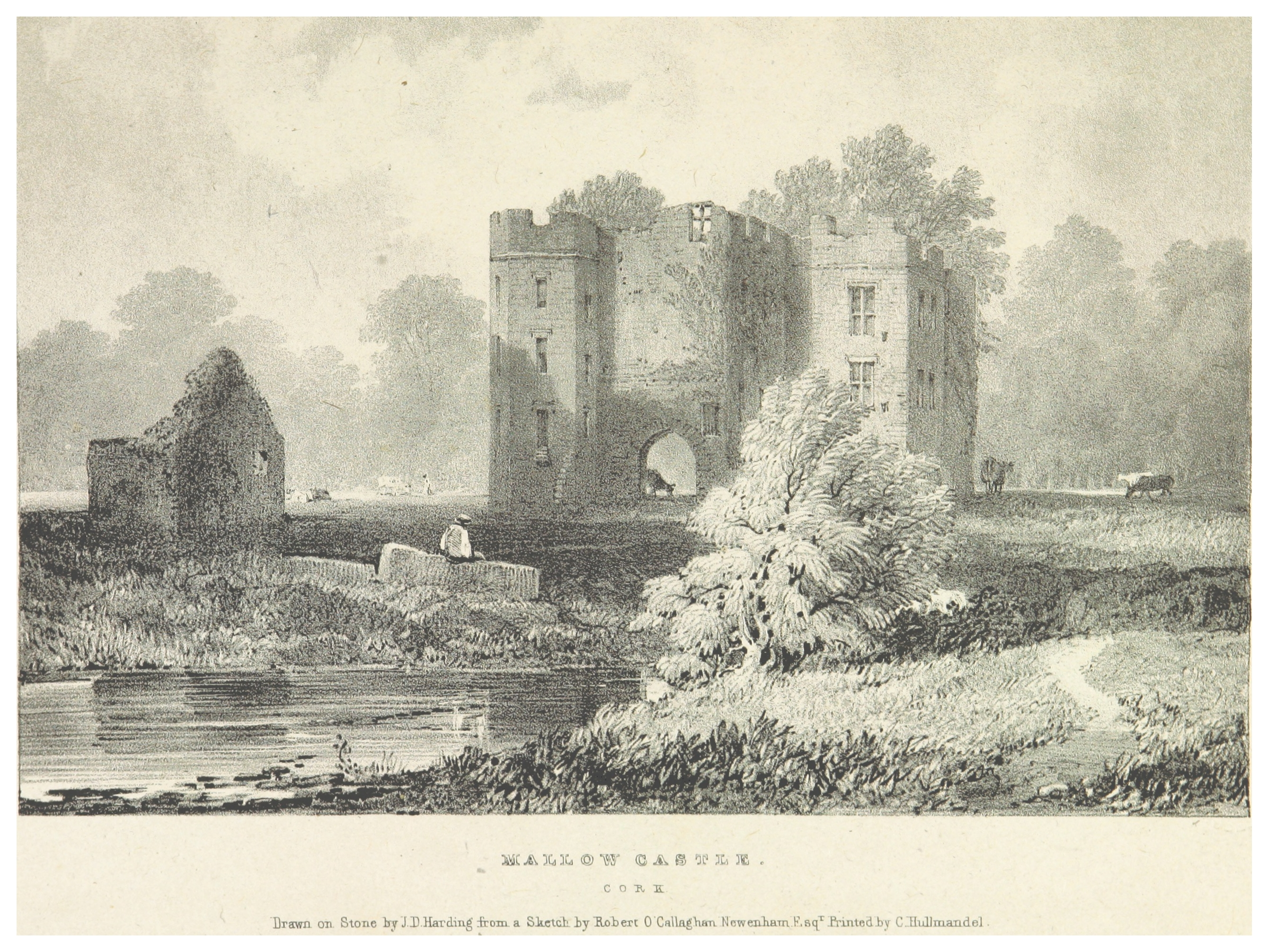
Ruins of Mallow Castle (1830)

He was the fifth of the six sons of Henry Norris, 1st Baron Norreys, of Rycote House and Wytham Abbey in Oxfordshire (the latter previously in Berkshire), and his wife, Margery, the youngest daughter of John Williams, 1st Baron Williams of Thame.

He matriculated at Magdalen College, Oxford, in 1571, aged 15, graduating Bachelor of Arts on 6 April 1576. Sir John Norris, and Sir Edward Norris were his brothers.

He married Bridget, daughter of Sir William Kingsmill of Sydmonton Court in Hampshire and Bridget Raleigh, by whom he had one daughter, Elizabeth, his sole heiress, who married Sir John Jephson of Froyle in Hampshire. She died in 1624, to her husband's intense grief. Their son William Jephson sat in the Long Parliament. Norreys built Mallow Castle, which remained in his daughter's family until the 1980s.

== Military career ==
In December 1579, he became, through the death of his eldest brother, William, and the influence of Sir William Pelham, captain of a troop of horse in Ireland. He took an active part in the following year in the campaign against Gerald FitzGerald, 15th Earl of Desmond; but during the absence of Sir Nicholas Malby, Lord President of Connaught, in the winter of 1580–81, he acted as governor of that province, and pursued the Burkes and other disturbers of the peace.

In 1581–82, he was occupied, apparently between Clonmel and Kilmallock, in watching the movements of the Earl of Desmond, and on the retirement, of Captain John Zouche in August 1582, on account of ill-health, he became colonel of the forces in Munster. He compelled the Earl of Desmond to abandon the siege of Dingle, but he lacked the resources to do more.

In consequence of the appointment of Thomas Butler, 10th Earl of Ormond as governor of Munster, Norris was able, early in 1583, to pay a brief visit to England. On his return he found employment in Ulster in settling a dispute between Hugh Oge O'Neill and Shane MacBrian O'Neill as to the possession of the castle of Shane's Castle (Edendougher), which he handed over to the latter as captain of Lower Clandeboye. He was commended by Lords-justices Adam Loftus and Henry Wallop. In the autumn of 1584 he took part in Sir John Perrot's expedition against the Scots in Antrim, and in scouring the woods of Glenconkeyne in search of Sorley Boy MacDonnell he was wounded in the knee with an arrow.

He returned to Munster, and in 1585–86 represented County Limerick in Parliament. In December 1585, he was appointed vice-president of Munster during the absence in the Low Countries of his brother John. It was a precarious situation. Under instructions from England, Norris, in March 1587, arrested James Fitzedmund Fitzgerald, seneschal of Imokilly, Patrick Condon, and others, whose loyalty was at least doubtful. The marriage of Ellen, daughter and sole heiress of Donald McCarthy, 1st Earl of Clancare, was a politically sensitive topic and Norris himself rejected her as his bride.

In June 1588, the matter became serious, when Florence MacCarthy married her and so united in himself the two main branches of the clan Carthy. Norris arrested Florence, but was induced to believe that he had acted innocently. In December he was knighted by Sir William Fitzwilliam; and Sir John Popham having consented to resign his seignory in the plantation of Munster, Norris obtained a grant of six thousand acres (24 km^{2}) in and about Mallow.

The Spanish Armada was over but the air was still full of rumours of invasion, and in 1589–90 Norris was engaged with Edmund Yorke, an engineer who had been sent over from England expressly for the purpose, in strengthening the fortifications of Limerick, Waterford, and Duncannon. He lacked cash, and a detachment at Limerick in May 1590 mutinied and marched to Dublin. The ringleaders were punished by Sir William Fitzwilliam.

Norris was in the winter of 1592–93 in England to report on the Munster plantation; he returned to Ireland about May 1593. With the exception of disturbances over the summer by Donogh Mac Carthy, the Earl of Clancare's illegitimate son, the province was peaceful.

On 10 August 1594, Norris went to Dublin to meet the new lord-deputy, Sir William Russell, whom he attended in his progress through Ulster. In the following year he served under his brother, Sir John Norris, against the Earl of Tyrone, and was wounded in the thigh in the engagement that took place halfway between Newry and Armagh on 4 September. He assisted Sir John Norris as commissioner for the pacification of Connaught in June 1596, but, in August, he was engaged in repelling an incursion of the MacSheehys and O'Briens into Munster. He hanged ninety of them within ten days, but they proved tenacious. He again in September accompanied Sir John Norris into Connaught.

Sir Richard Bingham's disgrace had temporarily deprived the province of its governor, and he was appointed by his brother provisional president of Connaught, on Sir Geoffrey Fenton's recommendation. The arrival shortly afterwards of the new president, Sir Conyers Clifford, saw him return to Munster, and in June 1597 he had pacified it. On the death of Sir John Norris in that year he succeeded him on 20 September as Lord President of Munster. Thomas Burgh, 3rd Baron Burgh died also, and Norris was, on 29 October, elected by the council, as lord justice of Ireland.

The election was not confirmed by Elizabeth, on the ground that his presence was specially required in Munster. Accordingly, Loftus and Gardiner having been appointed lords justices, Norris returned to Munster on 29 November.

== Later years and death ==
On the general insurrection of the Irish after the Battle of the Yellow Ford, on 14 August 1598, and the irruption into Munster of the Leinster Irish, under Owny MacRory O'More, Norris concentrated his forces in the neighbourhood of Mallow; but, not feeling sufficiently strong to encounter Owny MacRory, he withdrew to Cork. He was blamed for his retreat, for example in a letter of John Chamberlain on 22 November 1598. His situation deteriorated, but towards the end of December, he managed, though fiercely attacked by William Burke, to relieve Kilmallock. But a second expedition on 27 March 1599 only resulted in the capture of Carriglea Castle, and on 4 April he returned to Cork, skirmishing with the Irish all the way. The arrival of Robert Devereux, 2nd Earl of Essex afforded him a breathing space. He went to Kilkenny to meet the lord-lieutenant, and, returning to Munster, was on his way from Buttevant to Limerick on 30 May, when encountered Irish troops under Thomas Burke. In the skirmish, he was wounded by a pike in the neck. The Burkes were routed, and Norris reached Limerick apparently on 4 June. Having revictualled Askeaton, he joined Essex at Kilmallock, and attended him in his progress through the province till his departure on 20 June. But his wound became worse. He was taken to Mallow Castle, and, after lingering for some time in great pain, he died there on 20 August 1599.

== Literary connection ==
Norris is mentioned by their mutual friend Lodowick Bryskett as one of the company to whom Edmund Spenser on a well-known occasion in the late 1580s unfolded his project of writing The Faerie Queene.
