= Henry Norreys (colonel-general) =

Member of the Parliament of England

Sir Henry Norris (1554–1599) was an English soldier and politician during the Tudor period.

== Early life ==
Norreys was the fourth of the six sons of Margery and Henry Norris, 1st Baron Norreys. He matriculated at Magdalen College, Oxford, in 1571, and was created M.A. in 1588. He grew up at Rycote in Oxfordshire and Wytham in Berkshire (now Oxfordshire).

== Military career ==
He was captain of a company of English volunteers at Antwerp in June 1583, and while serving with his brothers John and Edward in the Low Countries in 1586 was knighted by Robert Dudley, 1st Earl of Leicester, after the battle of Zutphen (September). He was sent to Brittany in May 1592 to report on the condition of the English forces, and in December 1593 was captain of a regiment of nine hundred Englishmen there.

He was member of parliament for Berkshire in 1588–89 and 1597–1598, but spent his latest years with his brothers John and Thomas in Ireland. In 1595 he was colonel-general of infantry. Taking part under Robert Devereux, 2nd Earl of Essex, in the campaign in Munster in June 1599, he was wounded in the leg in an engagement with the Irish at Finniterstown. He bore amputation with patience, but died a few weeks later.
