= Rycote House =

House near Thame, Oxfordshire, United Kingdom

Coordinates: 51.7372°N 1.0359°W

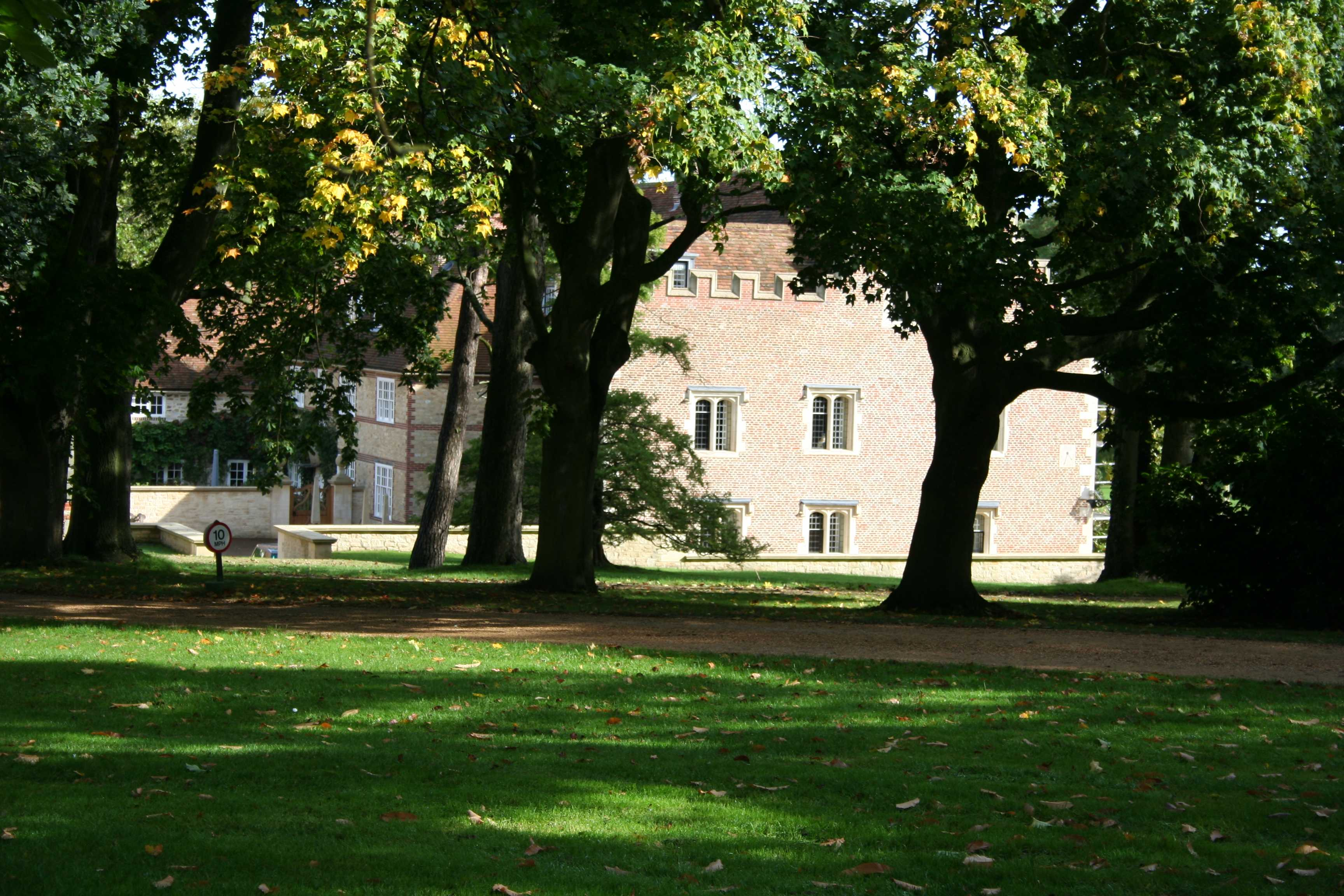
The present Rycote House, glimpsed from the Oxfordshire Way.

Rycote House (also Rycote Manor) the manor of Rycote, Oxfordshire, England, was a Tudor (and later Georgian) country house. First built in the early 16th century, the present site was rebuilt in the 1920s.

Rycote is a large house built of brick and limestone rubble arranged around three sides of a courtyard. The main wing has two storeys with attics and a 4-centre arched entrance. It is a Grade II* listed building.

== History ==
=== Origins ===
Carved masonry has been found from a substantial house that stood here in the 14th century. Rycote House was a great Tudor country house that was built here early in the 16th century, probably for Sir John Heron, Treasurer of the Chamber to first Henry VII and then Henry VIII, who bought the manor of Rycote on his retirement in 1521. The exact origins of the house remain uncertain, however. Henry VIII and his fifth wife, Catherine Howard, honeymooned here in 1540. Pictures from circa 1674-1685 and 1714 show that the main part of the house was arranged around a courtyard. It had stepped gables, a gatehouse and polygonal corner turrets with cupolas and was surrounded by a moat. Tudor buildings were constructed on a symmetrical pattern, with a focal central part being the Great Hall. Archaeologist Julian Munby analysed the bricks as being small and slim and typically from the Tudor period; some of the bricks were recycled from rubble masonry.

=== Use ===
According to historian Robin Bush, the palace was built between 1500 and 1530, and then sold by the original owner to pay off debts. In 1542 Rycote was bought by Sir John Williams, Master of the Jewels to Henry VIII and later created Baron Williams of Thame. Baron Williams died without a male heir, so Rycote became part of the Norreys family estates, descending to his son-in-law Henry Norris, 1st Baron Norreys.

Elizabeth I, according to John Foxe, came to Rycote for a night in July 1555 after nearly a year as a virtual prisoner at Woodstock Palace. She came as queen in August 1568 with William Cecil, while Henry Norris was in France as ambassador. Elizabeth visited again on 28 September 1592 and was presented with jewels during a country house entertainment. Charles I visited Rycote in 1625. In 1682 James Bertie, 5th Baron Norreys of Rycote, was created 1st Earl of Abingdon. He died in 1699 and a memorial to him was erected in the chapel in 1767.

=== Decline ===
It was long believed that Rycote House burned down in 1745 and that its remains were demolished in 1807, apart from one corner turret and some outbuildings. However, in 2001 Channel 4's Time Team investigated Rycote Park looking for the remains of the Tudor Rycote House and researcher George Pagliero established that Rycote had been rebuilt after the fire. The Bodleian Library in Oxford holds records of sales of contents and fabric from Rycote, indicating that the Tudor house was sold by lot for removal between 1779 and 1802.

In about 1920 the extensive stables were converted into the present Rycote House. Later, Rycote belonged to the Member of Parliament and prominent Rugby Union player Alfred St. George Hamersley (1848–1929). In the chapel, there is a memorial to Hamersley made by the sculptor Eric Gill.

== Bibliography ==
- Sherwood, Jennifer; Pevsner, Nikolaus (1974). Oxfordshire. The Buildings of England. Harmondsworth: Penguin Books. pp. 747–749. ISBN 0-14-071045-0.
- "Rediscovering Rycote: the history of a lost Tudor mansion". Rediscovering Rycote. Bodleian Libraries, University of Oxford.
