= Ryecote Entertainment =

The Ryecote Entertainment was a performance on 28 October 1592 to welcome Elizabeth I at Rycote House in Oxfordshire. During the drama, members of the Norris family presented the queen with jewels. These represented the military activities of the sons of Sir Henry Norris.

== Ryecote House and Henry Norris ==
Ryecote came to Henry Norris by his marriage to Margery Williams, a daughter of John Williams, 1st Baron Williams of Thame, who built the Tudor house (now demolished, except a part of the stable).

== Elizabeth I on progress ==
Elizabeth I planned to visit Ryecote in September 1582 but changed her mind. Robert Dudley, 1st Earl of Leicester came to the house and Margery Norris, Lady Ryecote, spoke of her disappointment and blamed Leicester and Christopher Hatton for the Queen's decision.

Elizabeth came to Rycote from Oxford in 1592. The first welcome speech was given by performer acting as an old veteran soldier. He compared Rycote to a crow's nest, transformed by Elizabeth's presence to a nest for a phoenix. He gave the queen a fair gown. The next day, in the garden, the old man gave another speech. An Irish messenger brought a letter from one of Norris' sons, a soldier in the Irish service, enclosing a dart studded with diamonds, with the motto, "I fly only for my sovereign". A messenger from Flanders brought a diamond-set gold key with the motto, "I only open to you". A French page brought three letters, the first was a comic interlude, the misdirected letter addressed to "Lady Squeamish". The second enclosed a French gold sword, with the motto, "Drawn only in your defence". The third letter brought a Spanish diamond set truncheon, with motto "I do not command but under you". When Elizabeth left Ryecote on Monday morning, a messenger brought a gold daisy set with rubies from Jersey, with a letter from Henry Norris' daughter.

The entertainment was published in Speeches delivered to her Majestie this last progresse, at the Right Honorable the Lady Russels, at Bissam, the Right Honorable the Lord Chandos at Sudley, at the Right Honorourable the Lord Norris at Ricote (Oxford: Joseph Barnes, 1592).

James VI and I visited Rycote in 1612, 1614, 1616, 1617, and 1619.
