= William Essex =

16th-century English politician

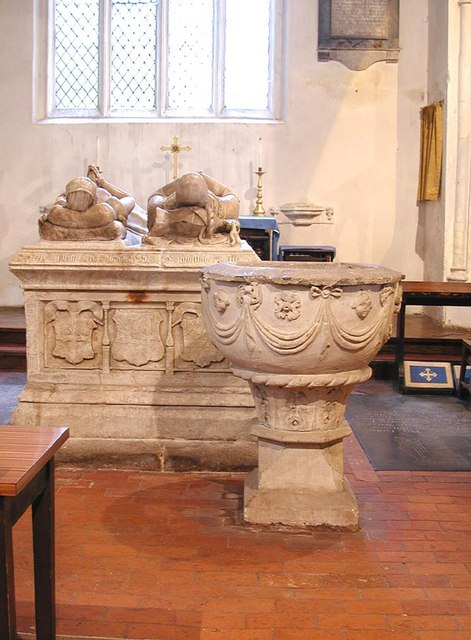
Monument of Sir Thomas Essex (son of Sir William Essex) and his wife Margaret Sandys, St Michael and All Angels Church, Lambourn

Sir William Essex (c. 1477–1548) of Lambourn, Berkshire was an English soldier and courtier who served as High Sheriff and Member of Parliament.

== Origins ==
He was the son of Thomas Essex of Lambourn in Berkshire by his wife, Elizabeth Babthorpe, a daughter of William Babthorpe of Ellistown in Leicestershire.

He served as High Sheriff of Berkshire and High Sheriff of Oxfordshire in 1509, 1518, 1523 and 1540 and as one of the MPs for Berkshire in 1529–1536 and 1542–1544.

He fought as a captain in the French campaigns of 1512 and 1513 and was knighted at Tournai. As a courtier he attended the wedding of Mary Tudor to Louis XII of France. He was also present in 1520 at the Field of Cloth of Gold and the meeting with Charles V at Gravelines.

== Marriage and children ==
He married Elizabeth Rogers, daughter and heiress of Thomas Rogers of Beckett Hall in Shrivenham, Berkshire (now Oxfordshire). They had two children:

- Sir Thomas Essex, who married Margaret Sandys, a daughter of Lord Sandys (Sandes) of the Vyne, Hampshire; his monument with recumbent effigies of himself and his wife survive in the Church of St Michael and All Angels, Lambourn.
- Winifred Essex who married Sir Richard Edgcumbe

Political offices
Preceded by Sir John Langford	High Sheriff of Berkshire and Oxfordshire; 1509–1510	Succeeded by William Harcourt
Preceded by Sir Edward Chamberlain	High Sheriff of Berkshire and Oxfordshire; 1518–1519	Succeeded by Thomas Englefield
Preceded by John Fettiplace	High Sheriff of Berkshire and Oxfordshire; 1524–1526	Succeeded by Thomas Denton
Preceded by Sir Richard Brydges	High Sheriff of Berkshire and Oxfordshire; 1540–1541	Succeeded by Sir Walter Stonor
Preceded by Unknown	Custos Rotulorum of Berkshire bef. 1544–1548	Succeeded by Robert Keilway
