= Margery Norris =

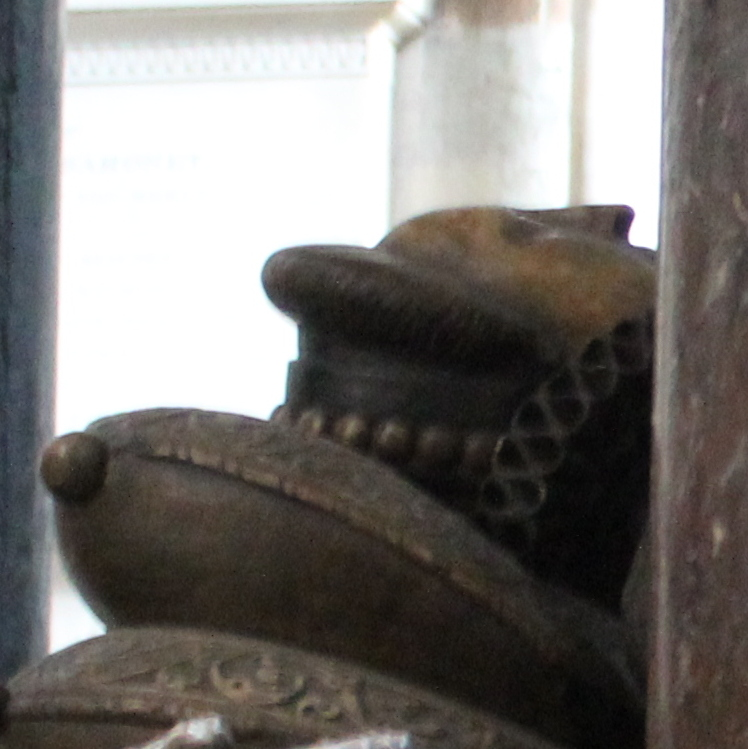
- detail of her in Westminster Abbey
- Died: December 1599
- Spouse: Henry Norreys
- Children: John Norris, Edward Norreys, Henry Norreys, Thomas Norris, Catherine Norris, William Norreys
- Parents: John Williams, 1st Baron Williams of Thame (father); Elizabeth Bledlowe (mother)

Margery Norris (1521–1599) was a courtier to Queen Elizabeth I. She, her husband and her six sons all served the crown and they have a huge monument in Westminster Abbey. From the mid-1540s to 1572 she was known as Mrs Norris, or Norrys.

== Life ==
Norris was born in 1521 and she was the daughter of John Williams, 1st Baron Williams of Thame and Elizabeth Edmonds. Norris had three brothers, John, Henry and Francis, and a sister, Isabel, who married Sir Richard Wenman.

She married Henry Norris, 1st Baron Norreys, as he became in 1572, sometime between December 1542 and 26 August 1544. Henry had recovered some of his father's lands as they had been forfeit when his father was beheaded for allegedly having sex with Anne Boleyn. Her father was a supporter of her husband who was not in favour under Queen Mary. Her father introduced the two of them to the future Queen Elizabeth I. Rycote played host to Elizabeth as her father was one of her guardians and she became close to Norris and her husband.

While Elizabeth did not appoint Margery to her Privy chamber or any other formal office at court, she considered Margery a personal friend, affectionally calling her "The Crow" in reference to her black hair. Margery accompanied her husband to his service as ambassador to France in 1566-1569, during which she is known to have corresponded with the queen about affairs of state.

In 1572 the Queen made her husband Baron Norreys. Elizabeth I planned to visit Ryecote in 1582 but changed her plans. Robert Dudley, 1st Earl of Leicester came to the house and Margery Norris spoke of her disappointment and blamed Leicester and Christopher Hatton for the Queen's decision. Elizabeth visited in 1592 and some detail is known of the Ryecote Entertainment of 1592.

Norris was the mother of seven children. Their six sons all distinguished themselves as soldiers.

- Sir John Norreys (1547 – 3 July 1597) who as known as "Black Jack"
- Sir William Norreys (1548 – 27 December 1579 Ireland) who was Marshal of Berwick.
- Sir Edward Norreys (c. 1550 – October 1603 Englefield), Governor of Ostend in 1590.
- Catherine Norreys (c. 1553 – ), married Sir Anthony Paulet, Governor of the Isle of Jersey about 1583 in Rycote, Oxfordshire.
- Sir Henry Norreys (1554–1599), fought in the Netherlands and then in Ireland, where he died.
- Sir Thomas Norreys (1556–1599), Lord President of Munster died in Ireland
- Maximilian Norreys (c. 1557 – 1591), buried in St Helier town church, Jersey.

Her son, Edward was relieved of his post in Ostend by Queen Elizabeth. She sent him home as all of his brothers had died as soldiers and Elizabeth wanted her friend Margery to have one of her sons by her. Margery died soon afterwards in 1599 and the Queen wrote off £2,000 of their debt.

She was buried in the church at Rycote and her husband joined her in 1601.

== Monument ==
She and her husband are commemorated by a huge eight metre high monument to them and their six sons in St. Andrew's Chapel in Westminster Abbey. The monument is by Isaac James (born Isaac Haastregt) and it was created in or after 1606. Life-size effigies of Lord and Lady Norreys lie beneath an elaborate canopy supported by marble pillars and they are surrounded by large kneeling figures of their sons. Five of them have their heads bowed and Edward, who survived them, does not.
