= Sheriff of Berkshire and Oxfordshire =

Ceremonial officer of Berkshire and Oxfordshire, England

This is a list of Sheriffs of Berkshire and Oxfordshire. One sheriff was appointed for both counties from 1248 until the end of 1566 (except for 1258–1259), after which separate sheriffs were appointed. See High Sheriff of Berkshire and High Sheriff of Oxfordshire for dates before 1248 or after 1566.

== 1248–1299 ==
- Easter 1248: Guy FitzRobert
- 6 October 1250: Nicholas de Hendred, of East Hendred
- 8 May 1254: John de Turberville, of East Hendred
- 19 November 1254: Nicholas de Hendred, of East Hendred
- 3 November 1258: Peter Foliot for Oxfordshire; Hendred continued for Berkshire
- Michaelmas 1259: Walter de la River
- 18 October 1261: Philip Basset
- Michaelmas 1262: Fulk de Rycote, of Rycote
- 27 June 1264: John de St Valery, of Hinton Waldrist
- 19 September 1265: Nicholas Syfrewast, of Purley Parva
- 23 November 1267: Sampson Foliot
- 28 October 1268: Thomas de St Vigore
- Easter 1270: William de L'Isle
- 15 May 1271: Roger de Meyland, Bishop of Coventry and Lichfield
- Michaelmas 1273: Gilbert de Kirkby
- 19 October 1274: Henry de Shottesbrooke, of Odstone
- 25 October 1278: Alan FitzRoald
- 9 May 1281: John de Tidmarsh, of Tidmarsh
- 1 July 1285: Ralph de Berners
- 6 May 1286: Sir Thomas Danvers, of Winterbourne
- 25 October 1289: William de Grenville
- 12 October 1290: Sir Richard de Williamscote, of Kiddington
- 13 May 1291: John de St John, of Lageham
- 4 October 1291: William de Bramshot
- 30 November 1295: Henry de Thisteldon

== 1300–1399 ==
- 16 October 1300: Adam de Brimpton
- 10 October 1301: Nicholas de Sparsholt
- 3 November 1307: Sir Thomas Danvers
- 21 April 1308: Richard D'Amary, of Bletchingdon
- 6 February 1311: Sir Thomas Danvers
- 23 April 1313: Philip De La Beche
- 16 October 1314: Richard de Windsor
- 20 October 1315: Richard de Polhampton
- 8 October 1317: Otvelus or Otewell Purcel
- 15 May 1318: Richard de la Bere
- 1 December 1318: Elias de Coleshill
- 8 February 1319: John de Brimpton
- 20 May 1322: Drew Barentine
- 8 February 1327: John de Brimpton
- 8 November 1328: John de Buckland
- 2 January 1330: Philip de la Beche
- 5 December 1330: Richard de Coleshill
- 7 August 1332: John de Brimpton
- 26 October 1333: Richard Abberbury, of Donnington
- 18 December 1333: John de Lewknor
- 20 December 1333: William de Sparsholt
- 17 June 1335: John de Alveton
- 8 October 1340: Edward de Malyns
- 10 November 1341: John de Alveton
- 19 November 1341: Robert FitzEllis, of Waterperry, Oxfordshire
- 4 November 1342: John de Alveton
- 11 November 1347: John Laundeles, of Bampton
- 6 November 1352: John de Alveton
- 10 November 1354: Richard de Williamscot
- 26 March 1355: Thomas Bessels, of Besselsleigh, Berkshire
- 1 April 1355: John de Nowers
- 28 November 1355: John Laundeles
- 21 November 1360: Roger de Elmridge
- 20 November 1362: Roger de Cottisford
- 15 July 1365: John de Trillowe
- 17 November 1365: Roger de Elmridge
- 27 November 1368: Roger de Cottisford
- 5 November 1369: Thomas de la Mare, of Aldermaston, Berkshire
- 5 November 1371: Sir Gilbert Wace, of Ewelme, Oxfordshire
- 12 December 1372: Sir Roger de Elmridge
- 7 November 1373: John James, of Wallingford, Berkshire
- 12 December 1374: Sir Gilbert Wace, of Ewelme, Oxfordshire (2nd term)
- 4 October 1375: Sir Reginald de Malyns, of Chinnor, Oxfordshire
- 26 October 1376: John de Rothwell
- 26 November 1377: Edmund Stonor, of Stonor, Oxfordshire
- 25 November 1378: Thomas Barantyn, of Chalgrove, Oxfordshire
- 5 November 1379: Sir Gilbert Wace, of Ewelme, Oxfordshire (3rd term)
- 18 October 1380: John James, of Wallingford, Berkshire
- 1 November 1381: Richard Brouns, of Harwell, Oxfordshire
- 24 November 1382: Thomas Barantyn, of Chalgrove, Oxfordshire (2nd term)
- 1 November 1383: John Hulcote, of Barcot
- 11 November 1384: Robert Bullock, of Arborfield, Berkshire
- 16 October 1385: John Hulcote, of Barcot
- 20 July 1386: William Golafre, of Fyfield, Berkshire
- 18 November 1386: Thomas Barantyn, of Chalgrove, Oxfordshire (3rd term)
- 18 November 1387: Sir Gilbert Wace, of Ewelme, Oxfordshire (4th term)
- 1 December 1388: Sir Thomas de la Poyle, of Hampton Poyle, Oxfordshire
- 15 November 1389: William Attwood, of Newbury, Berkshire
- 7 November 1390: Hugh Wolfes
- 21 October 1391: Robert Bullock, of Arborfield, Berkshire
- 18 October 1392: William Wilcotes, of North Leigh, Oxfordshire
- 7 November 1393: Thomas Faringdon
- 11 November 1394: Thomas Barantyn, of Chalgrove (4th term)
- 9 November 1395: Edmund Sparsholt, of Sparsholt's Court, West Hendred, Berkshire
- 1 December 1396: William Attwood, of Newbury, Berkshire
- 3 December 1397: John Golafre, of Fyfield, Berkshire
- 30 September 1399: Nicholas Golafre
- 3 November 1399: William Wilcotes, of North Leigh, Oxfordshire

== 1400–1499 ==
- 24 November 1400: Thomas Chaucer, of Ewelme, Oxfordshire
- 8 November 1401: John Wilcotes, of Great Tew, Oxfordshire (1st term)
- 29 November 1402: Robert James, of Wallingford, Berkshire
- 5 November 1403: Thomas Chaucer, of Ewelme, Oxfordshire
- 29 October 1404: John Golafre, of Fyfield, Berkshire
- 22 November 1405: Sir William Langford, of Bradfield, Berkshire
- 22 November 1406: Sir Robert Corbet
- 23 November 1407: John Wilcotes, of Great Tew, Oxfordshire (2nd term)
- 15 November 1408: Sir Thomas Harcourt, of Stanton Harcourt, Oxfordshire
- 4 November 1409: Sir Peter Bessels, of Besselsleigh, Berkshire
- 29 November 1410: Sir Robert Corbet
- 10 December 1411: Sir William Lisle, of Waterperry, Oxfordshire
- 3 November 1412: Edward Cowdray, of Padworth, Berkshire
- 6 November 1413: Thomas Wykeham, of Broughton Castle, Oxfordshire
- 10 November 1414: John Golafre, of Fyfield, Berkshire
- 1 December 1415: John Wilcotes, of Great Tew, Oxfordshire (3rd term)
- 30 November 1416: Robert James, of Wallingford, Oxfordshire
- 10 November 1417: Sir Thomas Wykeham, of Broughton Castle, Oxfordshire
- 4 November 1418: Robert Andrews
- 23 November 1419: John Wilcotes, of Great Tew, Oxfordshire (4th term)
- 16 November 1420: Sir William Lisle, of Waterperry, Oxfordshire
- 22 April 1422: John Wilcotes, of Great Tew, Oxfordshire (5th term)
- 1 October 1422: Sir William Lisle, of Waterperry, Oxfordshire
- 13 November 1423: Sir Thomas Stonor, of Stonor, Oxfordshire
- 6 November 1424: John Golafre, of Fyfield, Berkshire
- 15 January 1426: Sir Richard Walkstead
- 12 December 1426: Sir Thomas Wykeham, of Broughton Castle, Oxfordshire
- 7 November 1427: Sir Thomas Stonor, of Stonor, Oxfordshire
- 4 November 1428: Robert James, of Wallingford, Oxfordshire
- 10 February 1430: Philip Englefeld
- 5 November 1430: Sir Thomas Wykeham, of Broughton Castle, Oxfordshire
- 26 November 1431: William Fynderne, of Childrey
- 5 November 1432: William Darell, of Balsdon
- 5 November 1433: Stephen Hatfield
- 3 November 1434: Richard Restwold, of Crowmarsh Gifford, Oxfordshire and Sindlesham, Berkshire
- 7 November 1435: Thomas Fettiplace
- 8 November 1436: Richard Quartermain, of Rycote, Oxfordshire
- 7 November 1437: Sir John Norreys, of Ockwells, Berkshire
- 3 November 1438: Edward Reade
- 5 November 1439: Walter Shull or Skulle
- 4 November 1440: John Stokes
- 4 November 1441: Peter Fettiplace, of Stokenchurch, Oxfordshire
- 6 November 1442: Sir John Norreys, of Ockwells, Berkshire
- 4 November 1443: Sir John Chalers, of Ashampstead, Berkshire
- 6 November 1444: John Liddiard, of Benham, Berkshire
- 4 November 1445: John Rogers the Younger, of Benham, Berkshire
- 4 November 1446: Edward Langford, of Bradfield, Berkshire
- 9 November 1448: John Pennycock
- 20 December 1449: William Wykeham, of Broughton Castle, Oxfordshire
- 3 December 1450: Edward Reade
- 8 November 1451: Sir John Chalers, of Ashampstead, Berkshire
- 8 November 1452: John Rogers, of Benham & Lambourn, Berkshire
- 5 November 1453: Thomas Stonor, of Stonor, Oxfordshire
- 4 November 1454: Richard Quartermain
- 4 November 1455: Sir Robert Harcourt, of Stanton Harcourt, Oxfordshire
- 17 November 1456: Walter Mantell
- 7 November 1457: Sir John Norreys, of Ockwells, Berkshire
- 7 November 1458: William Brocas, of Cookham, Berkshire
- 7 November 1459: Sir Thomas de la Mare, of Aldermaston, Berkshire
- 18 November 1460: Sir Richard Harcourt, of Wytham, Oxfordshire
- 18 November 1461: Richard Restwold, of Crowmarsh Gifford, Oxfordshire and Sindlesham, Berkshire
- 9 February 1464: Thomas Rogers, of Benham & Lambourn, Berkshire
- Michaelmas 1464: John Barentine, of Haseley
- 5 November 1465: Thomas Stonor, of Stonor, Oxfordshire
- 5 November 1466: Sir Richard Harcourt, of Wytham, Oxfordshire
- 5 November 1467: Sir John Howard
- 5 November 1468: Sir William Norreys
- 5 November 1469: Thomas Prout
- 6 November 1470: Robert Greville
- 11 April 1471: Edward Langford, of Bradfield, Berkshire
- 9 November 1471: William Staverton, of Holyport
- 9 November 1472: William Beckingham
- 5 November 1473: John Langston, of Caversfield
- 7 November 1474: Humphrey Forster, the elder
- 5 November 1475: Sir Thomas de la Mare,
- 5 November 1476: Thomas Restwold, of Sindlesham, Berkshire
- 5 November 1477: James Viall
- 5 November 1478: John Norreys
- 5 November 1479: Sir Humphrey Talbot
- 5 November 1480: Sir Thomas de la Mare,
- 5 November 1481: Sir William Norreys, of Yattendon Castle, Berkshire
- 5 November 1482: Thomas Kingston
- 6 November 1483: John Barentine, of Little Haseley
- 5 November 1484: Edward Franke
- 12 September 1485: Sir William Stonor
- 5 November 1485: Sir Edmund Mountford
- 5 November 1486: Sir William Norreys
- 4 November 1487: Thomas Saye
- 4 November 1488: William Bessels
- 5 November 1489: Sir Thomas de la Mare,
- 5 November 1490: John Home
- 5 November 1491: William Harcourt
- 26 November 1492: Robert Harcourt, of Stanton Harcourt, Oxfordshire
- 7 November 1493: Sir Richard Guilford
- 18 March 1494: George Gaynsford, of Hampton Poyle, Oxfordshire
- 5 November 1495: John Ashfield
- 5 November 1496: Hugh Shirley
- 5 November 1497: Anthony Fettiplace, of Swinbrook
- 5 November 1498: George Gaynsford, of Hampton Poyle, Oxfordshire
- 11 November 1499: John Basket

== 1500–1566 ==
- 15 November 1500: William Bessels, of Besselsleigh, Berkshire
- 5 November 1501: Sir Richard Fowler
- 8 November 1502: Sir John Williams
- 18 November 1503: William Harcourt, of Cornbury
- 5 November 1504: Edward Greville
- 1 December 1505: Sir Edward Chamberlain, of Shirburn
- 27 November 1506: John Home or Horne
- 15 December 1508: Sir John Langford
- 14 November 1509: Sir William Essex, of Lambourne, Berkshire
- 9 November 1510: William Harcourt, of Cornbury
- 8 November 1511: William Barentyne, of Little Haseley
- 7 November 1512: Thomas Haydock
- 9 November 1513: Walter Rodney, of Chipping Norton
- 7 November 1514: Sir Simon Harcourt, of Stanton Harcourt, Oxfordshire
- 5 November 1515: Sir John Daunce, of Thame, Oxfordshire
- 10 November 1516: Sir George Forster, of Aldermaston Court
- 9 November 1517: Sir Edward Chamberlain, of Shirburn
- 8 November 1518: Sir William Essex
- 8 November 1519: Thomas Englefield
- 6 November 1520: Henry Brydges, (or Bruges) of Newbury (first term)
- 3 February 1522: John Osbaldeston, of Chadlington, Oxfordshire
- 12 November 1522: Sir Simon Harcourt, of Stanton Harcourt, Oxfordshire
- 13 November 1523: John Fettiplace
- 10 November 1524: Sir William Essex
- 7 November 1526: Thomas Denton, of Appleton, Oxfordshire
- 27 January 1526: Sir William Barentyne, of Little Haseley
- 16 November 1527: Thomas Elyot, of Long Combe
- 7 November 1528: Sir Simon Harcourt, of Stanton Harcourt, Oxfordshire
- 9 November 1529: William Stafford, of Bradfield, Berkshire
- 11 November 1530: Henry Brydges, of Newbury, Berkshire (second term)
- 9 November 1531: Thomas Unton or Umpton, of Minster Lovell & Wadley, Oxfordshire
- 20 November 1532: Sir Humphrey Forster, of Aldermaston, Berkshire
- 17 November 1533: William Fermor, of Somerton
- 14 November 1534: Sir Walter Stonor, of Stonor, Oxfordshire
- 22 November 1535: Thomas Carter
- 27 November 1536: Sir Anthony Hungerford, of Black Bourton, Oxfordshire
- 14 November 1537: Sir Simon Harcourt
- 15 November 1538: John Williams, of Rycote and Thame, Oxfordshire
- 17 November 1539: Richard Brydges (or Bruges)
- 17 November 1540: Sir William Essex
- 27 November 1541: Sir Walter Stonor, of Stonor, Oxfordshire
- 22 November 1542: Sir William Barentyne, of Little Haseley
- 23 November 1543: William Fermor, of Somerton
- 16 November 1544: John Williams, of Rycote and Thame, Oxfordshire.
- 22 November 1545: Sir Humphrey Forster, of Aldermaston, Berkshire.
- 23 November 1546: Sir Leonard Chamberlain
- 27 November 1547: Sir Francis Englefield, of Englefield, Berkshire.
- 3 December 1548: Sir Anthony Cope, of Hanwell, Oxfordshire.
- 12 November 1549: Sir William Rainsford.
- 11 November 1550: Richard Fiennes, of Broughton Castle, Oxfordshire.
- 11 November 1551: William Hyde, of South Denchworth.
- 10 November 1552: Sir Leonard Chamberlain, of Shirburn and Woodstock, Oxfordshire.
- Michaelmas 1553: John Williams, of Rycote and Thame.
- 8 November 1553: Sir John Brome, of Holton.
- 14 November 1554: Sir Richard Brydges.
- 14 November 1555: Sir William Rainsford, of Great Tew, Oxfordshire.
- 13 November 1556: Thomas Brydges, of Cornbury.
- 16 November 1557: John Denton, of Ambrosden, Oxfordshire.
- 23 November 1558: Richard Fiennes, of Broughton Castle, Oxfordshire.
- 9 November 1559: Edmund Ashfield, of Heythorp.
- 12 November 1560: Edward Fabian, of Compton.
- 8 November 1561: John D'Oyley.
- 19 November 1562: Henry Norris, of Rycote, Oxfordshire and Bray, Berkshire.
- 8 November 1563: Richard Wenman, of Thame and Witney, Oxfordshire.
- 9 November 1564: John Croker, of Hook Norton, Oxfordshire.
- 16 November 1565: Thomas Stafford, of Bradfield, Berkshire.
- 18 November 1566: Sir Christopher Brome

== See also ==
- High Sheriff of Berkshire
- High Sheriff of Oxfordshire

== Bibliography ==
- Hughes, A. (1898). List of Sheriffs for England and Wales from the Earliest Times to A.D. 1831. London: Eyre & Spottiswoode.
