= William Norreys (Berkshire MP) =

Member of the Parliament of England

Sir William Norreys (1552 – 25 December 1579) was an English soldier and courtier of the Tudor period.

== Family and life ==
Norreys was born in 1552 to Henry Norreys, 1st Baron Norreys (died 1601) and Lady Margery (née Williams; died 1599), daughter and co-heiress of John Williams, 1st Baron Williams. His parents outlived him and four of his brothers.

He was elected in 1572 as Member of Parliament to represent Berkshire during the reign of Elizabeth I and also served as Marshal of Berwick.

Norreys campaigned in Ireland from 1573 till 1576 as a Captain of Horse and again in 1579, where he died of fever. His older brother, Sir John Norreys (died 1597), was one of the most acclaimed English soldiers of his day.

In 1576, Norreys married Elizabeth Morrison (died 1611), the elder daughter of Sir Richard Morrison. They had a son, Francis Norris who became the 1st Earl of Berkshire.

Dame Elizabeth Morrison, his widow, married secondly in 1586 Henry Clinton, 2nd Earl of Lincoln, and had a son, who became known as Sir Henry Fynes (died 1641).

== See also ==
- Baron Norreys
