= Francis Englefield =

Member of the Parliament of England

Sir Francis Englefield
- Born: c.1522
- Died: 13 September 1596; St Albans College, Valladolid, Spain
- Spouse: Katherine Fettiplace
- Father: Sir Thomas Englefield
- Mother: Elizabeth Throckmorton

Sir Francis Englefield (c. 1522 – 1596) was an English courtier and Roman Catholic exile.

== Family ==
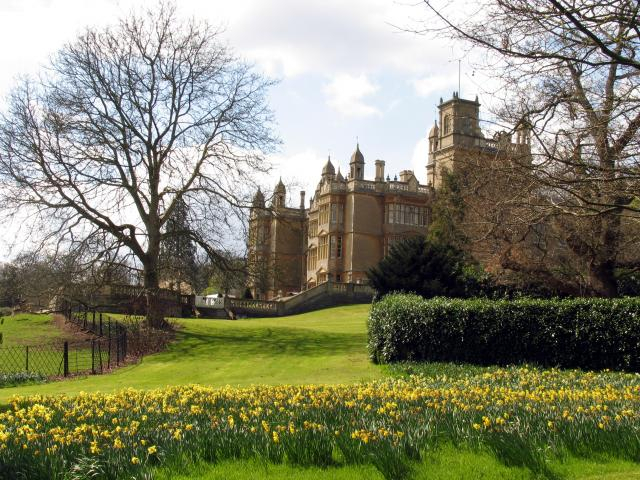
Englefield House on the Englefield Estate, near Reading

Francis Englefield, born about 1522, was the eldest son of Thomas Englefield (1488–1537) of Englefield, Berkshire, Justice of the Common Pleas, and Elizabeth Throckmorton (died 1543), sister of Sir George Throckmorton (died 1552), and daughter of Sir Robert Throckmorton (died 1518) of the well-known Catholic family of Coughton Court in Warwickshire. His grandfather, Sir Thomas Englefield (1455–1514), was an adviser to Henry VIII during the King's youth, and Speaker of the House of Commons in 1497 and 1510.

Englefield had a brother, John Englefield (died 1567), who married Margaret Fitton, the daughter of Sir Edward Fitton (died 1547/48) of Gawsworth and his wife, Mary Harbottle (died 1557), and three sisters, Margaret Englefield (died 1563), who married firstly, George Carew (died 1538), and secondly, Sir Edward Saunders (1506–1576), Chief Baron of the Exchequer; Anne Englefield, who married Humphrey Coningsby (1515–1569); and Susan Englefield, who married Humphrey Barnes.

== Career ==
Francis, who succeeded his father in 1537, was too young to have taken any part in the opposition to the abolition of the Roman Catholic jurisdiction and the dissolution of the monasteries; and he acquiesced in these measures to the extent of taking the oath of royal supremacy, serving as High Sheriff of Berkshire and Oxfordshire in 1546–1547. In 1545 he purchased the manor of Tilehurst, which had belonged to Reading Abbey. He was knighted at the coronation of Edward VI in February 1547.

However, the progress of the Reformation during that reign alienated him, and he became a member of the household of Princess Mary in 1549. In August of that year he was sent to the Tower for permitting Mass to be celebrated in Mary's household. He was released in the following March, and permitted to resume his duties in Mary's service but in February 1553 he was again summoned before the privy council, and may have been in confinement at the crisis of July; perhaps he was only released on Mary's triumph, for his name does not appear among those who exerted themselves on her behalf before the middle of August.

He was then sworn a member of the privy council, like many others who owed their promotion to their loyalty rather than to their political abilities. Their numbers swelled the privy council and sadly impaired its efficiency; but Mary resisted the various attempts to get rid of them because she liked staunch friends, and regarded them as a salutary check upon the abler but less scrupulous members who had served Edward VI as well as herself. Englefield sat as M.P. for Berkshire in all Mary's parliaments except that of April 1554, but received no higher political office than the lucrative mastership of the court of wards.

== Exile ==
He was an ardent supporter of the Marian persecutions, was present at Hooper's trial, sought Ascham's ruin, and naturally lost his office and his seat on the privy council at Elizabeth I's succession. He retired to the continent of Europe before May 1559, was outlawed in 1564, and lived in exile for the remainder of his life.

Englefield Attainder Act 1592
- Act of Parliament
- Parliament of England
- Long title: An Acte confyrming the Quenes Title to the lands of Sir Frauncys Englefield.
- Citation: 35 Eliz. 1. c. 5
- Territorial extent: England and Wales

Dates
- Royal assent: 10 April 1593
- Commencement: 18 February 1593 (Note: Start of session.)
- Repealed: 16 June 1977
Other legislation
Repealed by	Statute Law (Repeals) Act 1977
Relates to	Attainder of Lord Paget and others Act 1586

Status: Repealed

Text of statute as originally enacted

Englefield lived first at Rome, then in the Low Countries, and finally at Valladolid. He was blind for the last twenty years of his life, and received a pension of six hundred crowns from Philip. He had been outlawed in 1564 and his estates sequestered, but his correspondence with the pope and the King of Spain on behalf of Mary, Queen of Scots brought an Act of Attainder against Englefield in 1585. Even then some legal difficulties stood in the way of their appropriation by the crown, for Englefield, obviously with an eye to this contingency, had conditionally settled them on his nephew, Francis Englefield (c. 1561 – 26 October 1631). The long arguments on the point are given in Coke's Reports, and a further Act of Parliament was passed in 1592 confirming the forfeiture to the Crown (35 Eliz. 1. c. 5). The nephew, however, eventually recovered some of the family estates, and was created a baronet in 1612. His uncle was alive in September 1596, but apparently died at Valladolid about the end of that year. His tomb there used to be shown to visitors as that of an eminent man.

Englefield's nephew, namesake and heir, Sir Francis Englefield (c. 1561 – 26 October 1631), 1st Baronet Englefield, married Jane Browne, the daughter of Anthony Browne (22 July 1552 – 29 June 1592), and Mary Dormer, the daughter of Sir William Dormer (died 1575). Jane Browne was the niece of Mary Wriothesley, Countess of Southampton (22 July 1552 – 4 November 1607), and the granddaughter of Anthony Browne, 1st Viscount Montague (died 19 October 1592) by his first wife, Jane Radcliffe.

== Bibliography ==
- Cokayne, George Edward, ed. (1900). The Complete Baronetage. Vol. I. Exeter: William Pollard & Co.
- Fetherston, John, ed. (1877). The Visitation of the County of Warwick in the Year 1619. Vol. XII. London: Harleian Society.
- Keen, Alan, and Roger Lubbock (1954). The Annotator; The Pursuit of an Elizabethan Reader of Halle's Chronicle. London: Putnam.
- Loomie, A. J. (2004). "Englefield, Sir Francis (1522–1596)". Oxford Dictionary of National Biography (online ed.). Oxford University Press. doi:10.1093/ref:odnb/8811. (Subscription, Wikipedia Library access or UK public library membership required.) (subscription required)
- Questier, Michael C. (2006). Catholicism and Community in Early Modern England. Cambridge: Cambridge University Press.
- Richardson, Douglas (2011). Everingham, Kimball G. (ed.). Magna Carta Ancestry: A Study in Colonial and Medieval Families. Vol. III (2nd ed.). Salt Lake City. ISBN 144996639X

Political offices
Preceded by Sir Leonard Chamberlain	High Sheriff of Berkshire and Oxfordshire; 1547–1548	Succeeded by Sir Anthony Cope
