= Woodstock Palace =

Former palace in Oxfordshire, England

Coordinates: 51°50′45″N 01°21′50″W

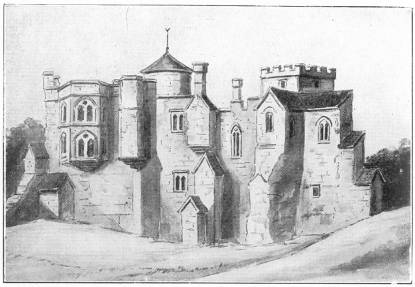
An old print of the Palace of Woodstock

Woodstock Palace was a royal residence in the English town of Woodstock, Oxfordshire.

Henry I of England built a hunting lodge here and in 1129 he built 7 miles (11 km) of walls to create the first enclosed park, where lions and leopards were kept. The lodge became a palace under Henry's grandson, Henry II, who spent time here with his mistress, Rosamund Clifford ("Fair Rosamund"). Henry III frequently visited the palace for entertainment, including once in 1237 when he invited his long-confined cousin Eleanor, Fair Maid of Brittany.

It continued to be used, as one of the large number of royal residences, through the Middle Ages and Tudor period, and sometimes under the early Stuarts, but was largely destroyed in the English Civil War. Several decades later, the park was given to John Churchill, 1st Duke of Marlborough and Blenheim Palace built there, removing what traces remained of the medieval house.

== Timeline ==
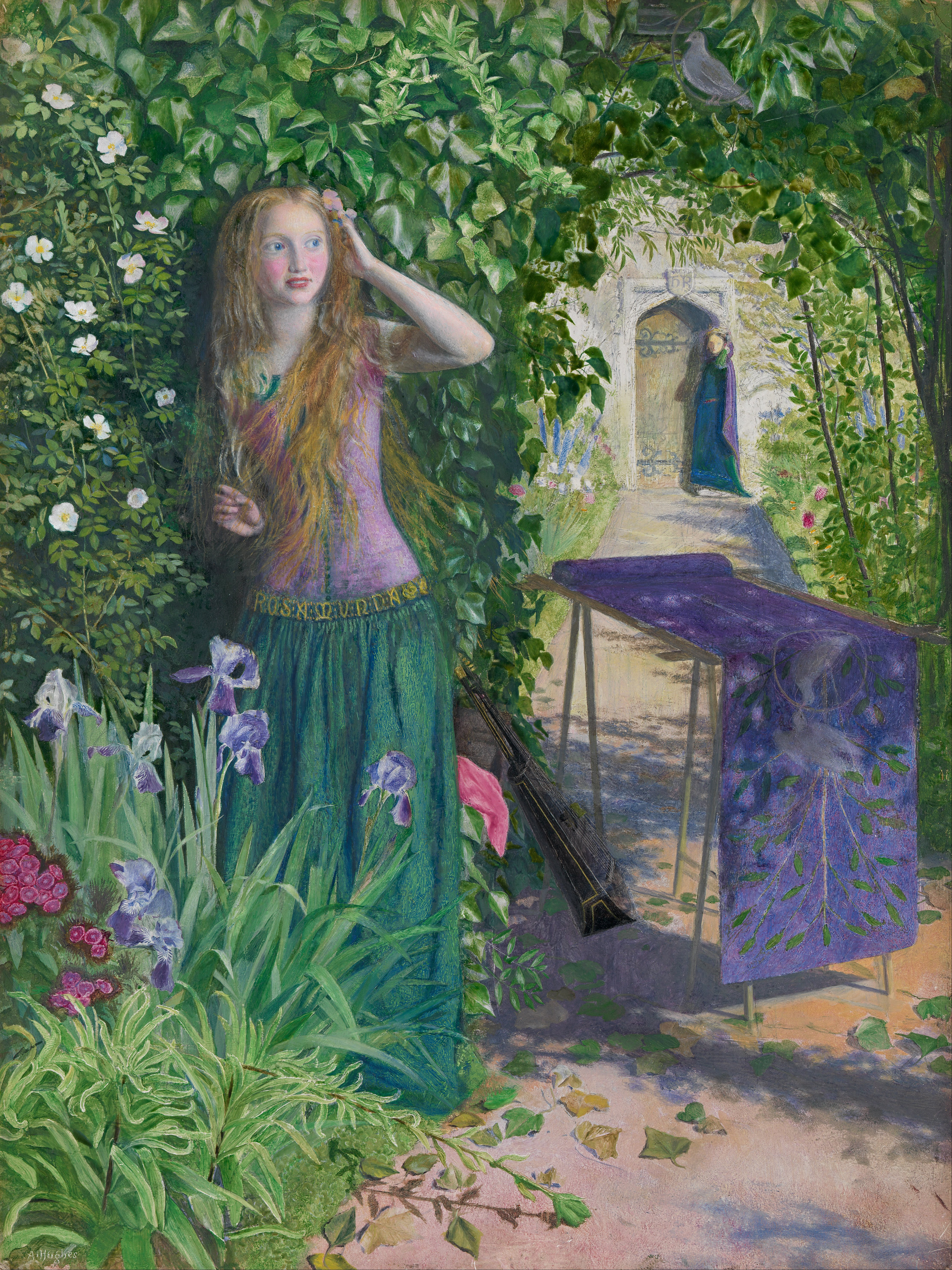
Fair Rosamund, hiding from the queen in her bower, Arthur Hughes, 1854

Important events that took place at the palace or manor include:

- The marriage of William the Lion, king of Scots to Ermengarde de Beaumont in 1186;
- The signing of the Treaty of Woodstock between Henry III of England and Llywelyn ap Gruffudd (1247);
- The birth of Edmund of Woodstock, 1st Earl of Kent (1301-1330), the sixth son of King Edward I, and the second by his second wife Margaret of France, and a younger half-brother of King Edward II;
- The birth of Edward the Black Prince (1330), eldest son and heir apparent of King Edward III and father of King Richard II;
- Isabella of England born here 1332 oldest daughter of Edward III;
- Thomas of Woodstock, Duke of Gloucester born here 1355, 7th son (5th surviving) and youngest child of Edward III;
- The marriage of Mary of Waltham, daughter of King Edward III, to John IV, Duke of Brittany (1361);
- A lost play, the Necromancer or Nigramansir by John Skelton is said to have been performed at the palace for Henry VII on Palm Sunday, 1501;
- Imprisonment of the future Queen Elizabeth I of England (1554–1558).

A chapel or oratory was built for Eleanor of Provence, the wife of Henry III, in 1250. The new chapel was dedicated to St Edward and located above the Queen's Chamber. Externally the chapel had crenellations.

== Fair Rosamunde and her bower ==
In English folklore, Rosamund Clifford's legend holds that King Henry II did everything to hide his affair from his wife, the formidable Queen Eleanor of Aquitaine. He saw Rosamund only in the middle of "Rosamund's Bower", a separate enclosed garden, sometimes with a building in the middle, in the park of Woodstock Palace. In later fantastical elaborations this is sometimes described as a complicated labyrinth, perhaps underground. After hearing rumours, the queen made her way inside and confronted her rival, forcing her to choose between a dagger and a bowl of poison; Rosamund chose the poison and died. Contemporary chronicler John Brompton did not recount this incident in his account of the events, and it first appeared in the 14th-century French Chronicle of London.

Several decades later, Henry II's grandson Henry III certainly established or expanded a "herber" or separate enclosed pleasure garden, in Woodstock Park, which was large enough for some costs to appear in his household accounts. This was a common feature of grand medieval gardens. In 1251 he built high walls around it, and in 1261 planted 100 pear trees.

Especially in the 19th century, the Rosamunde story became very popular in the arts, and several Pre-Raphaelite painters depicted her at Woodstock.

== Henry VII and family ==
Henry VII rebuilt a part of the palace in the 1490s. He resided at Woodstock in August and September 1497, July and September 1507, and September 1513. On 15 August 1497, a ceremony of betrothal or proxy wedding was held for Catherine of Aragon and Arthur, Prince of Wales at Woodstock.

Elizabeth of York and Anne Saye, a lady-in-waiting, became ill at Woodstock during a visit in August 1502. In September 1507, the Spanish ambassador Dr Puebla was at Woodstock and encouraged Catherine of Aragon to compose a letter in cipher code to a Spanish minister Almazan.

Henry VII spent over £4000 from his chamber account on building works at Woodstock. The work was supervised by Master George Gainesford, Sheriff of Oxfordshire and others, and the mason was William Este of Oxford. He modified the hall, a bay window for the Queen's chamber (for Elizabeth of York), and, in 1507, the gatehouse. According to Isaac Wake the gatehouse had a carved Latin inscription recording that it was the work of Henry VII. The King's chamber also had a bay window (built by William Flower), and there was a chamber for his mother, Lady Margaret Beaufort.

The new hall roof was constructed by a carpenter John Brian of Oxford in 1494. Brian complained that Henry VII had agreed to his drawing for the roof, but after he began cutting and shaping the timbers, Henry Dean, Prior of Llanthony (paymaster at the site) told him to make changes. Brian asked for another £9 to accommodate a change in the plan or "proposition" for the roof involving a round window. Stone for Palace in the 1490s was brought from quarries at Shirburn, Barrington, Taynton, and Windrush. Timber was brought from Bladon, Kirtlington, and Spelsbury. Bricks were made at Oxford and at Brill.

William Este or East maintained the Palace for many years. In the reign of Henry VIII, Sir Edward Chamberlain organised repairs to the newer buildings and to "Rosamund's Place". The roofs at Woodstock were repaired with lead taken from the Priory at Canons Ashby.

Henry VIII came to Woodstock in August 1532. He played dice and gave money to William Colyns, a "frantic man". According to William Latymer, Anne Boleyn was kind to one of her gentlewomen servants, Mrs Jaskyne, when she made a request to leave the court at Woodstock to visit her sick husband in September 1533 or July 1535. Edward VI sent a carpenter called Thomas Cropper to survey and draw the buildings.

== Elizabeth I and the gatehouse ==
Elizabeth I, as Princess or "Lady Elizabeth", was at Woodstock from 20 May 1554 to June 1555. Her keeper was Henry Bedingfeld of Oxburgh. At first, four chambers were furnished with tapestry for her. Bedingfield hesitated to allow her a cloth of estate, a canopy that signified royal status. He thought the palace did not have as many locked doors as required by its rural situation. John Foxe recorded some anecdotes of her time at the palace. According to John Foxe, there were five or six locked door between her lodging and the garden walks, and Elizabeth envied the freedom of the milkmaids at Woodstock who she could hear singing in the garden.

Elizabeth is said to have been lodged in the upper floors of the gatehouse in 1554, and scratched inscriptions on the palace windows with a diamond ring, and written on a shutter with charcoal, including the verse:

Much suspected by me,
Nothing proved can be,
Quoth ELIZABETH the prisoner.

Mary, Queen of Scots, quoted this phase in 1584, and Elizabeth's words were noted by the travellers Paul Hentzner and Henri, Duke of Rohan in 1600. A chamber in the gatehouse had an arched oak ceiling, with carving, painted blue with gilt decoration, and was later known as Queen Elizabeth's Chamber. According to Foxe, the route taken by Elizabeth from Woodstock to Hampton Court in 1555 included stops at Rycote, the house of Master Dormer at Wing, and the George Inn at Colnbrook.

Repairs made to the palace in 1576 included the plastering of several rooms. The accounts mention a courtyard with a fountain decorated in an earlier period with heraldic beasts, and a stairway to the great hall also featured four beasts. Repairs in 1595 including new decorative plasterwork were supervised by William Spicer, who was also surveyor of the military works at Berwick-upon-Tweed.

== 17th century ==
Inescutcheon "of the Honour and Manor of Woodstock", granted by royal warrant in 1722 as an augmentation of honour to the coat of arms of John Churchill, 1st Duke of Marlborough, and borne at his funeral.

King James I and his wife Anne of Denmark, her secretary William Fowler, and Arbella Stuart came to Woodstock in September 1603 during a time of plague. Sir Robert Cecil criticised the building as, "unwholsome, all the house standing upon springs. It is unsavoury, for there is no savour but of cows and pigs. It is uneaseful, for only the King and Queen with the privy chamber ladies and 3 or 4 of Scottish council are lodged in the house". The court was at Woodstock again in September 1610.

In 1610, King James I gave Woodstock Palace to his son Henry Frederick, Prince of Wales, who had a banqueting house built of leafy tree branches in the park, in which he held a dinner for his parents and his sister Princess Elizabeth in August 1612. Silver plate was brought from the Jewel House of the Tower of London to Anne of Denmark for the banquets. Henry paid for a poor boy from Woodstock to be apprenticed with Thomas Wilson, a shoemaker on the Strand who worked for the royal family.

On 19 February 1617, Woodstock was given to Prince Charles. Two sundials were constructed according to designs provided by a mathematician John Marr and the park was enlarged.

In 1649, a survey was made of the manor buildings, mentioning, "a large gatehouse and a courtyard, on the north of which there is range of buildings called the Prince's Lodgings, on the east a spacious hall, adjoining to which there is a chapel and lodgings, known by the name of the Bishop's Lodgings, another courtyard called the Wardrobe, surrounded with the Lord Chamberlain's lodgings and wardrobe rooms, adjoining which is the Queen's Hall and the steward's lodgings. There is a fair staircase leading up to the Guard Chamber, to which joins the Presence Chamber, on the right hand of which is the King's withdrawing room, bedchamber and closet, on the right hand the Queen's lodgings". The rooms were then mostly empty of furnishings.

Woodstock Palace was mostly destroyed during the English Civil War.

== Later history ==
In 1705, Benedict Leonard Calvert, 4th Baron Baltimore sold Woodstock Park to the Crown, which was owned at the time by virtue of his wife, Charlotte Lee. Charlotte Lee was the daughter of the 1st Earl of Lichfield and Lady Charlotte FitzRoy, the illegitimate daughter of King Charles II.

Later in 1705, Parliament granted the royal manor and honour (i.e. feudal barony) of Woodstock to John Churchill, 1st Duke of Marlborough (1650–1722), in recognition of his victory over the French at the Battle of Blenheim on 13 August 1704. The manor was to be held in feudal tenure from Queen Anne in free socage by service of grand serjeanty "of presenting at Windsor Castle, on the anniversary of the battle, a standard bearing the fleur-de-lys of France". An inescutcheon "of the Honour and Manor of Woodstock" was further granted by royal warrant in 1722 as an augmentation of honour to his coat of arms and was borne at his funeral. By a further Royal Licence, 26 May 1817, the inescutcheon was added as an augmentation of honour to the arms of the Dukes of Marlborough, and is still borne by them today. The arms comprise a Cross of St George surmounted by the royal arms of France.

Blenheim Palace was built in the manor of Woodstock for the Duke as his new seat. Some stone from the old Palace was used. The ruins of the old palace or manor house of Woodstock were removed in 1723.
