= William Hyde (high sheriff) =

Member of the Parliament of England

William Hyde (c. 1495–1557) was an English politician in the Tudor period.

William was the eldest son of Oliver Hyde of South Denchworth, near Wantage, in Berkshire (now Oxfordshire), and his wife, Anne, daughter of Thomas Lovingcott of Goring & Lovedays in Elmington in Oxfordshire. He inherited Denchworth upon his father's death in 1516. Around the same time, he married Margery, the daughter of John Cater of Letcombe Regis in Berkshire (now Oxfordshire). They had twenty children: twelve sons and eight daughters.

William was the High Sheriff of Berkshire and Oxfordshire in 1551. He was also a Member of Parliament for Berkshire in 1553, 1554 and 1555. He served against the rebels during the Pilgrimage of Grace and was amongst the English gentry who met Anne of Cleves upon her arrival in the country.

He died on 2 May 1557 and was succeeded in his estates by his eldest son, also William. He is remembered by a memorial brass in Denchworth Church.

Political offices
Preceded by Richard Fiennes	High Sheriff of Berkshire and Oxfordshire; 1551–1552	Succeeded by Sir Leonard Chamberlain
