= Richard Brydges =

16th-century English politician

Richard Brydges (c. 1500–1 August 1558) was an English politician.

Sir Richard Brydges was the Member of Parliament for Berkshire from 1539 to 1540 and, at other times, for Ludgershall. The Brydges family leased and then owned the manor of Ludgershall in Wiltshire for much of the sixteenth century.

Richard was the son of Henry Brydges (or Bruges), Esq., of Newbury, Berkshire by his wife, Margery (Hungerford) Bedford, daughter of John Hungerford, Esq. Richard was also a first cousin to John Brydges, 1st Baron Chandos. He served as the High Sheriff of Berkshire in 1554.

== Family ==
He married twice, firstly to a granddaughter of William Norreys, Esquire of the Body to King Edward IV, and secondly to Lady Jane Spencer, the daughter of Sir William Spencer (1483–1558) of Wormleighton & Althorp in Northamptonshire. Richard died on 1 August 1558, after which Jane later married Sir Simon Harcourt.

Sir Richard Brydges and Lady Jane Spencer were the parents of the following children:

- Jane Brydges, born c. 1542
- Anthony Brydges, born c. 1544, m. Barbara Pexsall, 1562
- Edmund Brydges, born c. 1548, d. after 1594 West Bradley, Somerset, m. Alice, daughter of Richard Goddard and Marie Alleyne.
- Frances Brydges, born c. 1553, who married in 1574, Nicholas Stephens, Esq. of Burderop Park near Chiseldon, Wiltshire (1555 - 1611)

Ludgershall Lodge in Wiltshire and Great Shefford Manor in Berkshire were his chief residences, and he and his second wife Lady Jane Spencer are remembered by a large effigial monument in Ludgershall Church.

== Sources ==
- Royal Berkshire History: Great Shefford Manor
- "Brydges, John" , Dictionary of National Biography, London: Smith, Elder & Co, 1885–1900 (which erroneously describes Richard as Lord Chandos' brother)
- Ludgershall Church Monument

Political offices
Preceded by John Williams	High Sheriff of Berkshire and Oxfordshire; 1539–1540	Succeeded by Sir William Essex
Preceded by Sir John Brome	High Sheriff of Berkshire and Oxfordshire; 1554–1555	Succeeded by Sir William Rainsford
