= Edward Chamberlain (died 1557) =

English politician

Edward Chamberlain (by 1509 – 29 October 1557) was an English politician.

== Family ==
Chamberlain was the second son of Sir Edward Chamberlain, MP. His brothers were the MPs Sir Leonard Chamberlain and Sir Ralph Chamberlain. In 1548, he had married Elizabeth Lawrence, daughter of Mr. Lawrence of Fulwell, Oxfordshire. She was the widow of Sir John Welsborne, who had died April 1548. Elizabeth and Chamberlain had one son, Richard.

== Career ==
He was a Member (MP) of the Parliament of England for Heytesbury in 1545, Buckingham in March 1553 and Mitchell in October 1553.
