= Edward Norreys (died 1603) =

16th-century English politician

Sir Edward Norreys (or Norris) (died 1603) was a 16th-century Governor of Ostend and English Member of Parliament.

== Life ==
Norreys was the third son of Henry Norris, 1st Baron Norreys and his wife, Lady Margery Williams, then of Wytham in Berkshire (now Oxfordshire). He was elected as Member of Parliament for Abingdon in the Parliaments of 1584–1585 and 1588–1589. Like his more famous brother, Sir John Norreys, Edward became a distinguished soldier, fighting in the Netherlands. He was knighted by the Earl of Leicester in 1586 and was appointed Governor of Ostend in 1590. In February the following year he raided the Spanish fort at Blankenberge and destroyed it, returning to Ostend with little loss.

In England, Sir Edward lived on a small estate at Englefield in Berkshire. Dudley Carleton was his secretary.

Edward was relieved of his post as Governor of Ostend by the Queen. She sent him home as all of his brothers had died as soldiers and Elizabeth wanted her friend, and his mother, Margery to have one of her sons by her. Margery died soon afterwards in 1599 and the Queen wrote off £2,000 of their debt.

Sir Edward married Elizabeth Norreys in 1600, but the cousinly union did not produce any children. He died in October 1603. Thomas Edmondes wrote that Norreys died after a quarrel with his wife left his mind unbalanced. She subsequently married the Scottish courtier Sir Thomas Erskine.

Parliament of England
Preceded by Richard Beake	Member of Parliament for Abingdon; 1584–1585	Succeeded by Miles Sandys
Preceded by Miles Sandys	Member of Parliament for Abingdon; 1588–1589	Succeeded by William Braunche
Political offices
Preceded by Sir Henry Neville	Custos Rotulorum of Berkshire; 1601–1603	Succeeded by Sir Henry Neville
