= Henry Norreys, 1st Baron Norreys =

English nobleman and courtier (c. 1525–1601)

Henry Norris
- Baron Norreys
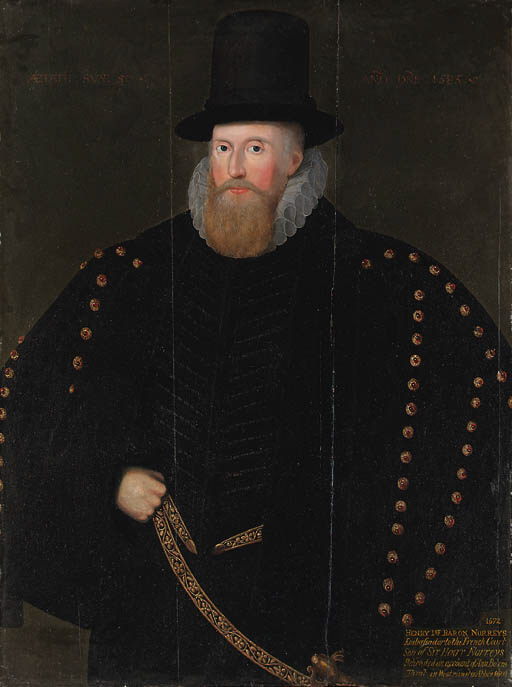
- Henry Norris, aged 60, 1585
- Born: c. 1525
- Died: 27 June 1601 (aged 75–76); Rycote
- Buried: 5 August 1601; Chapel of St Michael and All Angels, Rycote; 51.73802°N 1.03517°W
- Spouse: Margery Williams
- Issue: Sir John Norreys; Sir William Norreys; Sir Edward Norreys; Catherine Norreys; Sir Henry Norreys; Sir Thomas Norreys; Maximilian Norreys
- Father: Henry Norris
- Mother: Mary Fiennes, Lady Norris
- Occupation: English politician and diplomat

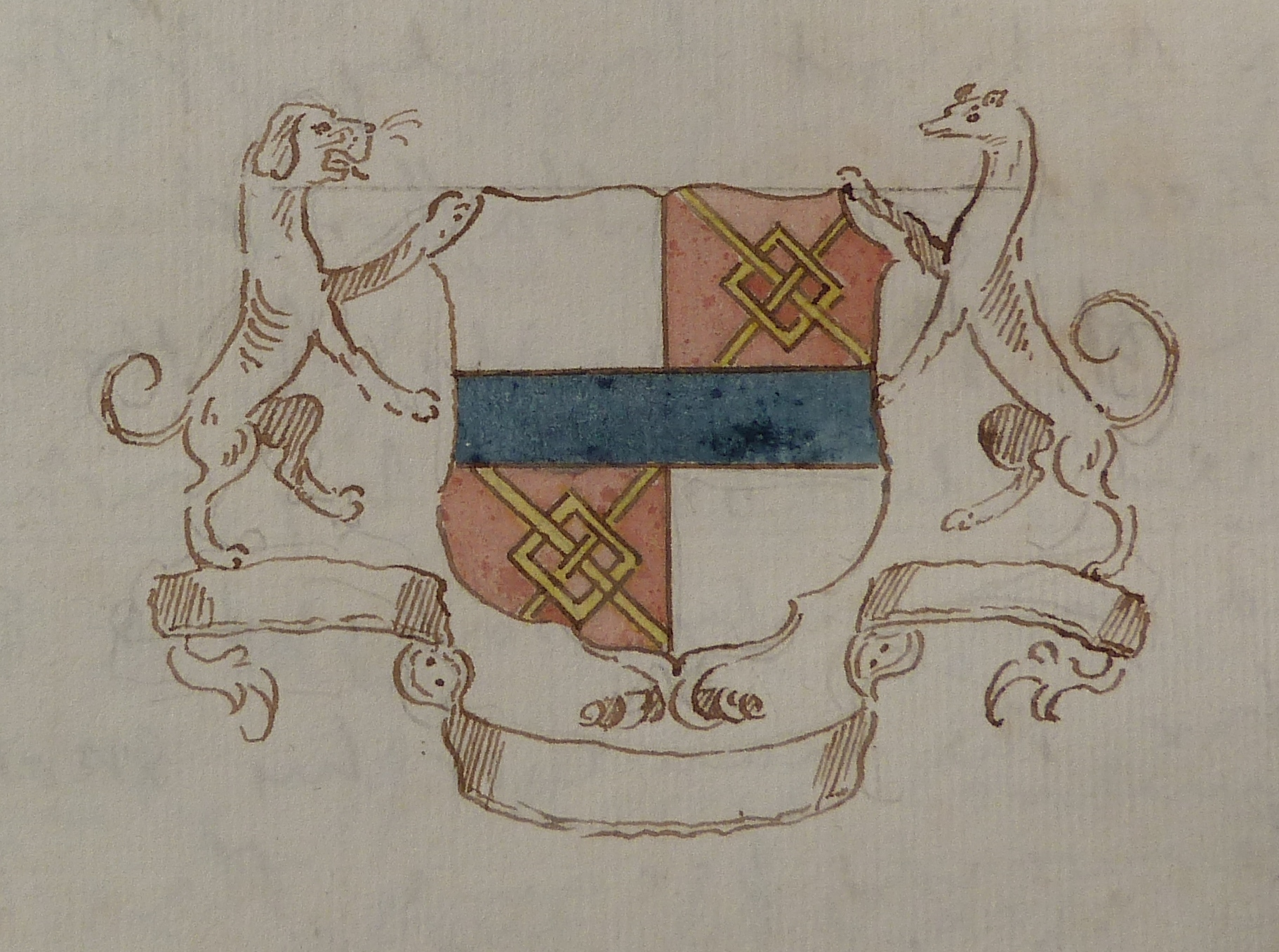
Coat of arms, Henry, 1st Baron Norris of Rycote

Henry Norris (or Norreys, Norrys), 1st Baron Norreys (c. 1525 – 27 June 1601) of Rycote in Oxfordshire, was an English politician and diplomat, who belonged to an old Berkshire family, many members of which had held positions at the English court.

His wife Margery Norris was an intimate courtier of Elizabeth I, who both the couple had known before she became queen. Knighted in 1566, he became Baron Norreys of Rycote, on 8 May 1572.

== Origins ==
He was the son of Sir Henry Norreys (d. 1536), who was beheaded for his supposed adultery with Queen Anne Boleyn, and Mary Fiennes (1495–1531), daughter of Thomas Fiennes, 8th Baron Dacre (1472–1534).

== Early career ==
Restitution of Sir Henry Norreys Act 1539
- Act of Parliament
- Parliament of England
- Long title: An act for the restitution of Henry Norries.
- Citation: 31 Hen. 8. c. 22 Pr.
- Territorial extent: England and Wales

Dates
- Royal assent: 28 June 1539

Status: Current legislation

The early years of Henry's life are obscure. His mother had died in 1531, and his father was beheaded in 1536, leaving him and his younger sister Mary orphans. The children were brought up by their childless uncle, Sir John Norreys. Henry's patrimony was restored to him by a private act of Parliament, the Restitution of Sir Henry Norreys Act 1539 (31 Hen. 8. c. 22 Pr.), and in December 1542 his uncle Sir John Norreys of Yattendon, was licensed to settle his estates in reversion on Henry, who was his ward, and on Margery, the younger daughter of John Williams, 1st Baron Williams of Thame, and their heirs. The couple must therefore have been betrothed by this date.

Henry's prospects were bright. He was made a knight of the shire for Berkshire in 1547. His wife, Margery, was the coheir of her wealthy father, who had become treasurer of the court of augmentations and who was continuing to acquire land in Berkshire. The deaths of Henry's uncle (1563) and father-in-law (1559) greatly increased Henry's already considerable wealth, bringing him properties in Oxfordshire, where he and his wife settled, and in Berkshire. These included Rycote, Sydenham and Yattendon Castle.

== Royal friendship ==
In 1553, Henry was among the King's gentlemen who witnessed the device settling the crown upon Lady Jane Grey. After the succession crisis, Queen Mary did not hold this act against him, approving his appointment as the butler of Poole later in that same year. In 1554, he was assigned to guard Princess Elizabeth at Woodstock. Elizabeth believed his father had died for his loyalty to her mother, Queen Anne, and brought him and his wife into her trusted circle, where he would stay for the remainder of his life.

In November 1565, on the occasion of the third marriage of Ambrose Dudley, Earl of Warwick, another member of Elizabeth's trusted circle, Henry participated in a tournament in the Queen's presence.

Elizabeth visited the couple at their estate Rycote, Oxfordshire, on numerous occasions; in September 1566 on her return from Oxford, during which she knighted Henry; in 1568, 1570, 1572, and in September 1592, on another journey from Oxford. Upon the death of their son, Sir John Norreys, who was a distinguished soldier in Elizabeth's armies, the queen sent a stately letter of condolence to "my own dear crow", as the Queen still affectionately called Margery.

== Later career ==
In 1561, Norris was made High Sheriff of Oxfordshire and Berkshire. In the autumn of 1566, he was appointed Ambassador to France by the queen. In March 1567, Charles IX of France showed him a new lodging in a French palace. Norris observed a painting of the fortress town of Newhaven or Ambleteuse, and a Latin inscription claiming the English had captured it by a trick. Norris complained and was told the King and his mother Catherine de' Medici had not noticed this, and could not read Latin. The inscription was changed to read that the English had taken the town by force of arms.

Elizabeth I wondered if he and his wife would be able to recruit a French tailor to serve her in England. William Cecil requested French books including architectural works by Philibert de l'Orme. Norris was recalled from France in August 1570 and replaced by Sir Francis Walsingham. By way of recompense for his services abroad, he was summoned to the House of Lords, as Baron Norreys of Rycote, on 8 May 1572.

In October 1596, Henry was created Lord Lieutenant of Oxfordshire. He already held the same office for Berkshire.

== Marriage and issue ==
Henry married Margery (or Margaret), (1521 – December 1599), daughter of John Williams, 1st Baron Williams of Thame, sometime between December 1542 and 26 August 1544. They were the parents of seven children. His six sons all distinguished themselves as soldiers.

- Sir John Norreys (1547 – 3 July 1597)
- Sir William Norreys (1548 – 27 December 1579 Ireland)
- Sir Edward Norreys (c. 1550 – October 1603 Englefield), Governor of Ostend in 1590.
- Catherine Norreys (c. 1553 – ), married Sir Anthony Paulet, Governor of the Isle of Jersey about 1583 in Rycote, Oxfordshire.
- Sir Henry Norreys (1554–1599), fought in the Netherlands and then in Ireland, where he died.
- Sir Thomas Norreys (1556–1599), Lord President of Munster died in Ireland
- Maximilian Norreys (c. 1557 – September 1593), killed in Brittany while serving under his brother, John.

Edward was relieved of his post in Ostend by the Queen. She sent him home as all of his brothers had died as soldiers and Elizabeth wanted her friend Margery to have one of her sons by her. Margery died soon afterwards in 1599 and the Queen wrote off £2,000 of their debt.

== Death and burial ==
Henry died on 27 June 1601, having outlived his wife and five of his children, and was temporarily buried, on 21 May, in the church at Englefield, where his son Edward was living. Finally, on 5 August, he was re-interred at Rycote, in a vault beneath the chapel of St Michael and All Angels, in the grounds of Rycote House. His will was dated 24 September 1589.

== Monument ==
Both he and his wife are commemorated by the monument erected in honour of them and their six sons in St. Andrew's Chapel in Westminster Abbey. Life-size effigies of Lord and Lady Norreys lie beneath an elaborate canopy supported by marble pillars and they are surrounded by kneeling figures of their children.

== Notes ==
Political offices
Preceded by John D'Oyley	High Sheriff of Berkshire and Oxfordshire; 1562–1563	Succeeded by Richard Wenman
Unknown	Lord Lieutenant of Berkshire and Oxfordshire; 1586–1601; With: Sir Francis Knollys 1586–1596; Sir William Knollys 1596–1601	Succeeded by Sir William Knollys
Peerage of England
New creation	Baron Norreys; 1572–1601	Succeeded by Francis Norris
