= Rycote =

Hamlet in Oxfordshire, England

Coordinates: 51.7373°N 1.0362°W

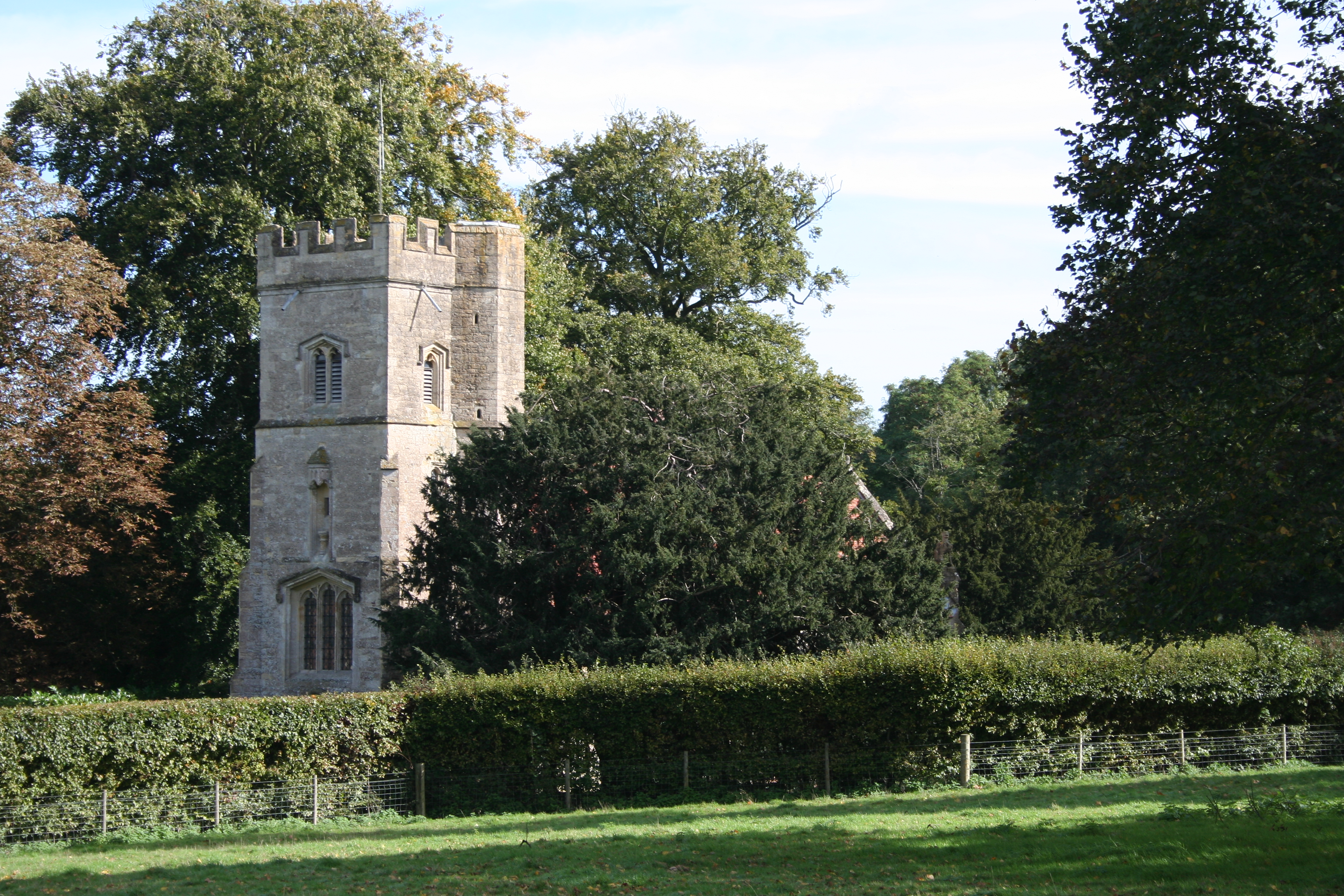
- Saint Michael's chapel

- Location within Oxfordshire
- OS grid reference: SU666047
- Civil parish: Great Haseley
- District: South Oxfordshire
- Shire county: Oxfordshire
- Region: South East
- Country: England
- Sovereign state: United Kingdom
- Postcode district: OX9
- Dialling code: 01844
- Police: Thames Valley
- Fire: Oxfordshire
- Ambulance: South Central
- UK Parliament: Henley
- Website: The Haseleys

Rycote is a hamlet located 2.5 miles (4.0 km) southwest of Thame in Oxfordshire, England. The Oxfordshire Way long-distance path passes through.

== Saint Michael's chapel ==
Richard and Sybil Quartermayne, lord and lady of the manor of Rycote, founded Saint Michael's chapel as a chantry in 1449. It is a Perpendicular Gothic building with a chancel, nave and west tower. It retains original 15th-century wooden fittings including pews, stalls and a screen. In the 17th century the chapel was ornamented with a west gallery, altar rails, a reredos and other fittings. The first reredos, dated 1610, is now damaged and in 1974 was kept under the tower. It has been replaced by a second reredos dated 1682. Margery Norris and Henry Norris, 1st Baron Norreys are buried here. The chapel is both a Grade I listed building and a scheduled monument.

== Rycote House ==
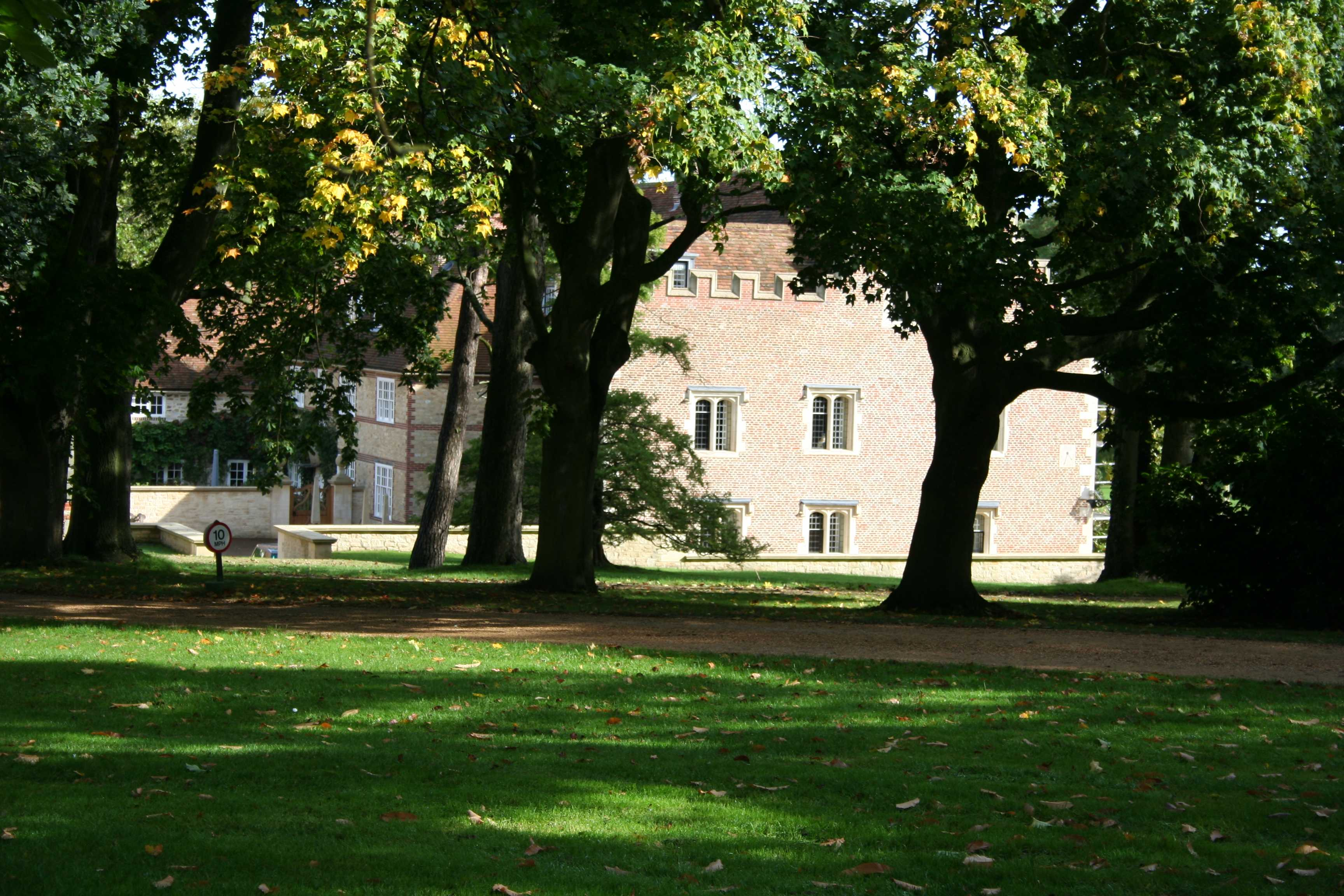
The present Rycote House, glimpsed from the Oxfordshire Way.

Carved masonry has been found from a substantial house that stood here in the 14th century. Rycote House was a great Tudor country house that was built here early in the 16th century, probably for Sir John Heron, Treasurer of the Chamber to first Henry VII and then Henry VIII, who bought the manor of Rycote on his retirement in 1521. Henry VIII and his fifth wife, Catherine Howard, honeymooned here in 1540. Pictures from circa 1695 and 1714 show that the main part of the house was arranged around a courtyard. It had stepped gables, a gatehouse and polygonal corner turrets with cupolas and was surrounded by a moat.

In 1539 Rycote was bought by Sir John Williams, who later was created Baron Williams of Thame. Baron Williams died without a male heir, so Rycote became part of the Norreys family estates via his daughter Margery Norris. Elizabeth I visited Rycote while she was still a princess.Charles I visited Rycote in 1625. In 1682 James Bertie, 5th Baron Norreys of Rycote was created 1st Earl of Abingdon. He died in 1699 and a memorial to him in the chapel was erected in 1767.

It was long believed that Rycote House burned down in 1745 and that its remains were demolished in 1800, apart from one corner turret and some outbuildings. However, in 2001 Channel 4's Time Team investigated Rycote Park looking for the remains of the Tudor Rycote House and established that Rycote had been rebuilt after the fire over a period of about 20 years. The Bodleian Library in Oxford holds records of sales of contents and fabric from Rycote, indicating that the Tudor house was sold by lot for removal between 1779 and 1807, the year in which the 5th Earl of Abingdon ordered its demolition. In about 1920 the extensive stables were converted into the present Rycote House. Later Rycote belonged to the Member of Parliament and prominent Rugby Union player Alfred St. George Hamersley (1848–1929). In the chapel there is a memorial to Hamersley made by the sculptor Eric Gill. The house is Grade II* listed.

== Sources ==
- Sherwood, Jennifer; Pevsner, Nikolaus (1974). Oxfordshire. The Buildings of England. Harmondsworth: Penguin Books. pp. 747–749. ISBN 0-14-071045-0.
