= John Norris (soldier) =

16th-century English soldier

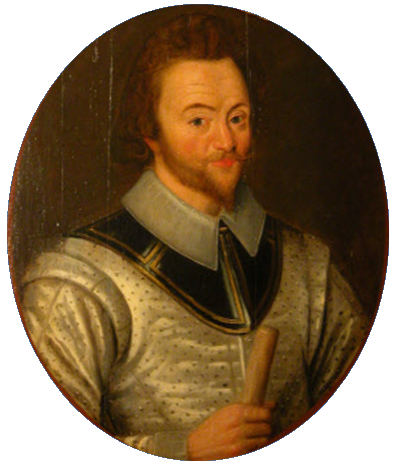
Sir John Norreys. Oil on panel by an unknown author of the English school (1600 – 1629).

Sir John Norris, or Norreys (ca. 1547 – 3 September 1597), of Rycote, Oxfordshire, and of Yattendon and Notley in Berkshire, was an English soldier. The son of Henry Norris, 1st Baron Norreys, he was a lifelong friend of Queen Elizabeth.

An active English soldier, Norreys participated in multiple Elizabethan theatres of war: the Wars of Religion in France, Flanders during the Eighty Years' War of Dutch liberation from Spain, the Anglo-Spanish War, and the Tudor conquest of Ireland.

== Early life ==
The eldest son of Henry Norreys by his marriage to Marjorie Williams, Norreys was born at Yattendon Castle. His paternal grandfather had been executed after being found guilty of adultery with Queen Anne Boleyn, the mother of Queen Elizabeth. His maternal grandfather was John Williams, Lord Williams of Thame.

Norreys' great uncle had been a guardian of the young Elizabeth, who was well acquainted with the family. She had stayed at Yattendon Castle on her way to imprisonment at Woodstock. The future Queen was a great friend of Norreys' mother, whom she nicknamed "Black Crow" on account of her jet black hair. Norreys inherited his mother's hair colour so that he was known as "Black Jack" by his troops.

Norreys grew up with five brothers, several of whom were to serve alongside him during Elizabeth's wars. He may briefly have attended Magdalen College, Oxford.

In 1566, Norreys' father was posted as English ambassador to France, and in 1567, when he was about nineteen, Norreys and his elder brother William were present at the Battle of Saint Denis. They drew a map of the battle which formed part of their father's report to the Queen.

== Early military career ==
When his father was recalled from France in January 1571, Norreys stayed behind and developed a friendship with the new ambassador, Francis Walsingham. In 1571, Norreys served as a volunteer under Admiral Coligny, fighting on the Huguenot side during the French Wars of Religion.

Two years later, Norreys served as a captain under Sir Walter Devereux, recently created first Earl of Essex, who was attempting to establish a plantation in the Irish province of Ulster as part of the Enterprise of Ulster, from a base at Belfast. He supported his elder brother William, Essex's chief lieutenant, who was in command of a troop of a hundred horse which had been recruited by their father, then serving as Lord Lieutenant of Berkshire. William was the first of Essex's commanders to be ambushed by Irish forces and when his horse was killed under him, near Massereene, east of Lough Neagh, John saved his brother from being slain. The Earl praised their actions in a letter to the queen.

While in Ulster Norreys took part in the arrest of Sir Brian McPhelim O'Neill, Chief of the Name of Clan O'Neill and Lord of Lower Clandeboye, and what has become known as the Clandeboye massacre. Lord Essex hosted The O'Neill and his clansmen at a banquet held at Belfast in October 1574. The O'Neill reciprocated by hosting Essex and his followers at a feast of his own, which lasted for three days; but on the third day, Norreys and his men slaughtered over 200 of O'Neill's unarmed clansmen. Essex took Sir Brian, his wife and others to Dublin where they were later executed.

When Lord Essex entered County Antrim, it was to Rathlin Island that the Scots Highlanders of Clan MacDonald of Dunnyveg led by Somhairle Buidhe MacDonnell sent their wives and children, their aged and sick, for safety. Lord Essex, knowing that the Scots refugees were still on the island, sent orders to Norreys, who was in command at Carrickfergus, to take a company of soldiers with him, cross over to Rathlin Island, and kill everyone he could find. Norreys had brought cannon with him, so that the weak defences were speedily destroyed after a fierce assault in which several of the garrison were killed. The Scots were obliged to surrender with no quarter and all fell victim to the Rathlin Island Massacre, except the chief and his family, who were reserved for ransom. The death toll was two hundred. Then it was discovered that several hundred more, chiefly women and children, had been hidden in the caves about the shore, all of them were massacred, too.

A fort was erected on the island, but was evacuated by Norreys, and he was recalled with his troops to Dublin within 3 months, when it was clear that the colonisation would fail. William, his brother, died of fever in Newry, Christmas Day 1579 on returning to Ireland from England.

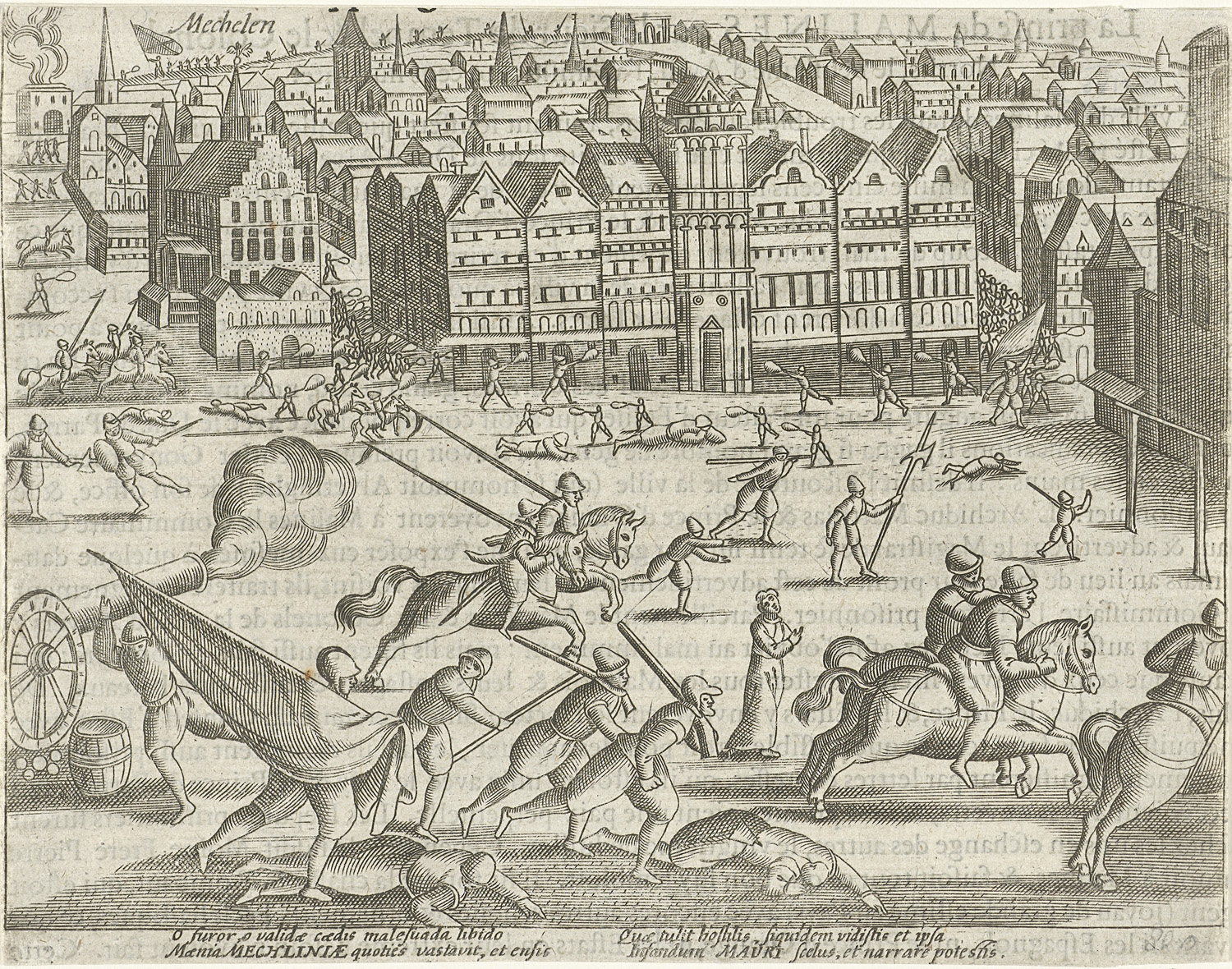
The English fury on the Grote Markt in Mechelen, 1580

In 1577, Norreys led a force of English volunteers to the Low Countries, where he fought for the States General, then in revolt against the rule of the Spanish King Philip II at the beginning of the Eighty Years' War. At the battle of Rijmenam (2 August 1578), his force helped defeat the Spanish under the command of John of Austria (Don Juan de Austria), the king's brother; Norreys had three horses shot from under him.

Throughout 1579, he co-operated with the French army under François de la Noue, and was put in charge of all English troops, about 150-foot and 450 mounted. He took part in the battle of Borgerhout, where the Spanish army under Alexander Farnese was victorious. Later, he went on to match the Spanish in operations around Meppel and on 9 April 1580, his troops conquered Mechelen and brutally sacked the city in what has become known as the English Fury at Mechelen. During the 16th century, the usual laws and customs of war permitted up to three days of sacking after the fall of a city, while the English mercenaries under Norreys' command continued looting and pillaging the city for nearly an entire month. Furthermore, the sacking of Mechelen by Norreys' troops was far more brutal and systematic that the infamous "Spanish fury" that had hit the same city in 1572.

On account of these successes, essentially as a mercenary, he boosted the morale in the Protestant armies and became famous in England. The morale of his own troops depended on prompt and regular payment by the States General for their campaign, and Norreys gained a reputation for forceful leadership.

In February 1581, he defeated the Count of Rennenburg by relieving Steenwijk under siege and in July inflicted a further defeat at Kollum near Groningen. In September 1581, however, he was dealt a serious defeat by a Spanish army under Colonel Francisco Verdugo at the Battle of Noordhorn, near Groningen. The following month Norris later checked Verdugo by repelling him at Niezijl. Later in the year, he along with the Count of Hohenlohe helped to relieve the city of Lochem which had been under siege by Verdugo.

After more campaigns in Flanders in support of François, Duke of Anjou, Norreys was sent back to the Dutch Republic as an unofficial ambassador of Elizabeth I.

In 1584, he returned to England to encourage an English declaration of war on Spain in order to support the States General's war against the House of Habsburg.

== Return to Ireland ==
In March 1584, Norreys departed the Low Countries and was sent to Ireland in the following July, where he was appointed Lord President of Munster (at this time, his brother Edward was stationed there). Norris urged the Plantation of Munster with English Puritans (an aim adopted in the following years), but the situation proved so unbearably miserable that many of his soldiers deserted him for the Low Countries.

In September 1584 Norreys accompanied the Lord Deputy of Ireland, Sir John Perrot, and the earl of Ormonde into Ulster. The purpose, once again, was to dislodge the Highlander Scots of Clan MacDonald of Dunnyveg, who, led by Somhairle Buidhe MacDonnell, had migrated into both the Route and the Glens of Antrim. Norreys helped rustle fifty thousand head of cattle from the woods of Glenconkyne in order to starve the Highlanders of their means of sustenance. The campaign was unsuccessful, as what is now called the Clan MacDonald of Antrim simply regrouped in Kintyre before crossing back to Ireland after the lord deputy had withdrawn south. Norreys returned to Munster, where he become unintentionally important to the history and martyrology of the Catholic Church in Ireland.

In April 1585, the jailer at Clonmel, County Tipperary was bribed by Victor White, a leading townsman, to release imprisoned Roman Catholic priest Fr. Muiris Mac Ionrachtaigh for one night to say Mass and administer Holy Communion inside White's house on Easter Sunday (11 April 1585). Permission was granted and Fr. MacKenraghty spent the whole night hearing Confessions.

The jailer, however, had secretly tipped off Lord President of Munster Sir John Norreys, who had just arrived at Clonmel. According to historian James Coombes, "Norris (sic) arranged to have White's house surrounded by soldiers and raided. The raiding party entered it shortly before Mass was due to begin and naturally caused great panic. Some people tried to hide in the basement; others jumped through the windows; one woman broke her arm in an attempt to escape. The priest hid in a heap of straw and was wounded in the thigh by the probing sword of a soldier. Despite the pain, he remained silent and later escaped. The soldiers dismantled the altar and seized the sacred vessels."

Meanwhile, Victor White was arrested and threatened with execution unless he revealed where Fr. Muiris Mac Ionrachtaigh could be arrested. Upon hearing of the situation, Fr. Mac Ionrachtaigh sent an emissary to speak to White. Despite White's pleas that he preferred to lose his own life rather than have Fr. Mac Ionrachtaigh come to harm, the priest insisted upon giving himself up and was again thrown into Clonmel Gaol.

The trial of Fr. Mac Ionrachtaigh by martial law involved merely an interrogation before Sir John Norreys and his assistants. Pardon and high preferment were offered for conforming to the Church of Ireland and taking the Oath of Supremacy to accept the subservience of the Church to the State. Fr. Mac Ionrachtaigh, however, resolutely maintained the Roman Catholic faith and the Petrine Primacy and was accordingly condemned by Sir John Norreys, "after much invective", to death for high treason. After passing sentence, however, Norreys offered Fr. Mac Ionrachtaigh a full pardon in return for taking the Oath of Supremacy and naming those local Catholics who had attended his Mass or secretly received the Sacraments from him. A Protestant minister also attempted to convert the priest by engaging him in debate. All was in vain, and Fr. Mac Ionrachtaigh refused to conform. According to historian James Coombes, "Especially in trials by martial law, there was no fixed procedure or sequence of events. What is made perfectly clear is that Maurice MacKenraghty was condemned to death because he would not take the Oath of Supremacy."

On 30 April 1585, Fr. Muiris Mac Ionrachtaigh was dragged at the tail of a horse to be executed as a traitor. According to Bishop David Rothe, "When he came to the place of execution, he turned to the people and addressed them some pious words as far as time allowed; in the end he asked all Catholics to pray for him and he gave them his blessing."

He was hanged, cut down while still alive, and then executed by beheading. His head was spiked and displayed in the marketplace along with the four quarters of his torso.

Norreys was then summoned to Dublin Castle in 1585 for the opening of Parliament. He sat as a Member of Parliament (MP) for County Cork and was forcefully eloquent on measures to confirm the Queen's authority over the whole country. He also complained that he was prevented from launching a fresh campaign against the rising of the Irish clans in Ulster.

== Anglo-Spanish War ==
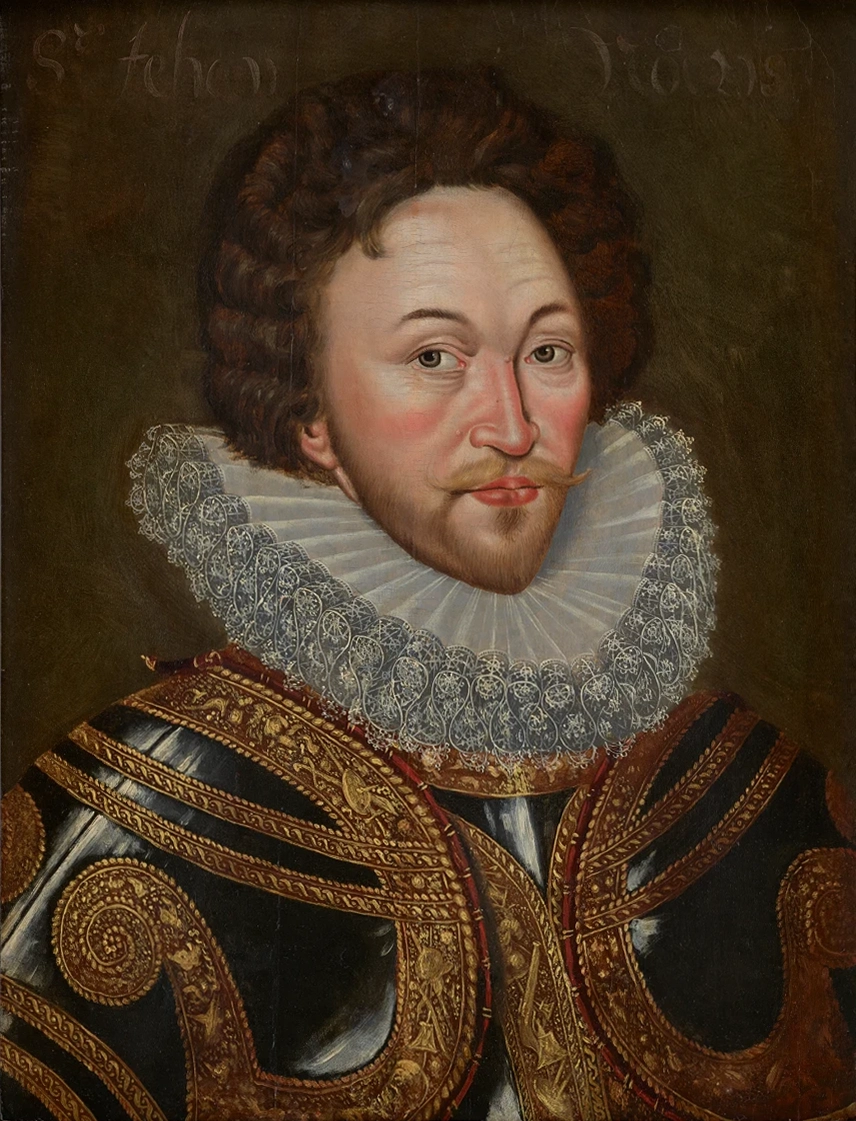
Portrait of Sir John Norris, oil on panel, late 1580s

Upon news of the siege of Antwerp, Norreys urged support for the Dutch Protestants and, transferring the presidency of Munster to his brother, Thomas, he rushed to London in May 1585 to prepare for a campaign in the Low Countries. In August, he commanded an English army of 4400 men which Elizabeth had sent to support the States General against the Spaniards, in accordance with the Treaty of Nonsuch. He gallantly stormed a fort near Arnhem; the queen, however, was unhappy at this aggression. Still, his army of untried English foot did repulse the Duke of Parma in a day-long fight at Aarschot and remained a threat, until supplies of clothing, food and money ran out. His men suffered an alarming mortality rate without support from home, but the aura of invincibility attaching to the Spanish troops had been dispelled, and Elizabeth finally made a full commitment of her forces to the States General.

In December 1585, the Earl of Leicester arrived with a new army and accepted the position of Governor-General of the Low Countries, as England went into open alliance. During an attack on Parma, Norreys received a pike wound in the breast, then managed to break through to relieve Grave, the last barrier to the Spanish advance into the north; Leicester knighted him for this victory during a great feast at Utrecht on St George's Day, along with his brothers Edward and Henry. But the Spanish were soon admitted to Grave by treachery, and Norreys advised against Leicester's order to have the traitor beheaded, apparently because he was in love with the traitor's aunt.

The two commanders quarrelled for the rest of the campaign, which turned out a failure. Leicester complained that Norreys was like the Earl of Sussex in his animosity. His main grievance, though, was the corruption of Norreys' uncle, the campaign's treasurer. Leicester's urgings to recall both Norreys and his uncle, were resisted by the Queen. Norreys continued his good service and was ordered by Leicester to protect Utrecht in August 1586. The operation did not go smoothly because Leicester had omitted to put Sir William Stanley under Norreys' command. Norreys joined with Stanley in September in the Battle of Zutphen, in which Sir Philip Sidney - commanding officer over Norreys' brother, Edward, who was lieutenant in the governorship of Flushing - was fatally wounded. At an officers' supper, Edward took offence at some remarks by Sir William Pelham, marshal of the army, which he thought reflected on the character of his older brother, and an argument with the Dutch host flared up, with Leicester having to mediate between the younger Norreys and his host to prevent a duel.

By the autumn of 1586 Leicester seems to have relented and was full of praise for Norreys, while at the same time the States General held golden opinions of him. But he was recalled in October, and the queen received him with disdain, apparently owing to his enmity for Leicester; within a year he had returned to the Low Countries, where the new commander, Willoughby, recognised that Norreys would be better for the job, with the comment, "If I were sufficient, Norreys were superfluous". Willoughby resented having Norris around and observed that he was, "more happy than a caesar".

At the beginning of 1588, Norreys returned to England, where he was presented with the degree of Master of Arts at the University of Oxford.

Later in the year, when the Spanish Armada was expected, he was, under Leicester, marshal of the camp at West Tilbury when Elizabeth delivered the Speech to the Troops at Tilbury. He inspected the fortification of Dover, and, in October, returned to the Low Countries as ambassador to the States-General. He oversaw a troop withdrawal in preparation for an expedition to Portugal designed to drive home the English advantage following the defeat of the Spanish Armada, when the enemy's fleet was at its weakest.

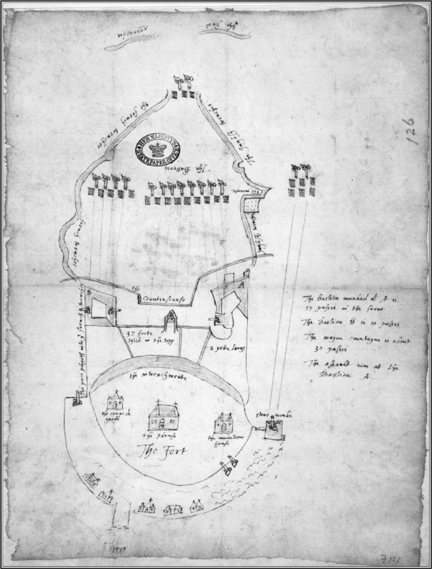
Norreys' sketch of the Spanish fort El Léon at Crozon 1594

On Wednesday 17 April 1589 (although another source gives the date of departure as 18 April), Norreys set out with Drake at the head of a 23,000 strong expeditionary force (which included 19,000 troops and is now termed the English Armada) on a mission to destroy the shipping on the coasts of Spain and to place the pretender to the crown of Portugal, the Prior of Crato, on the throne. Corunna was surprised, and the lower part of the town burned as Norreys' troops beat off a force of 8,000. Edward was badly wounded in an assault on O Burgo, and his life was only saved by the gallantry of his elder brother. Norreys then attacked Lisbon, but the enemy refused to engage with him, leaving him no option but to put back to sea. Running low on supplies and with his task force reduced by disease and death, Norreys abandoned the secondary objective of attacking the Azores, and the expeditionary force set out to return to England. By the start of July 1589 (Wingfield gives a date of 5 July) the taskforce had all arrived home, some landing back at Plymouth, some at Portsmouth and others London, having achieved little. This "English Armada", was thus an unsuccessful attempt to press home the defeat of the Spanish Armada and bring the war to the ports of Spain's northern coast and to Lisbon.

From 1591 to 1594, Norreys aided King Henri IV in his struggle with the Catholic League, fighting for the Huguenot cause in Brittany at the head of 3000 troops. He took Guingamp and defeated the Breton Catholic League and their Spanish allies at Château-Laudran. Some of his troops transferred to the Earl of Essex's force in Normandy, and Norreys' campaign proved so indecisive that he left for England in February 1592 and did not return to the Duchy of Brittany until September 1594.

He seized the town of Morlaix after he had outmanoeuvred the Duke of Mercour and Juan del Águila. Afterwards, he was part of the force that besieged and brutally assaulted and captured Fort Crozon outside Brest, defended by 400 Spanish troops, as well as foiling the relief army under Águila. This was his most notable military success, despite heavy casualties and suffering wounds himself. His youngest brother, Maximilian, was slain while serving under him in this year. Having fallen afoul of his French Protestant colleagues, Norreys returned from Brest at the end of 1594.

== Return to Ulster ==
Norreys was selected as the military commander under the new lord deputy of Ireland, Sir William Russell, in April 1595. The waspish Russell had been governor of Flushing, but the two men were on bad terms. Sir Robert Devereux, 2nd Earl of Essex had wanted his men placed as Russell's subordinates, but Norreys rejected this and was issued with a special patent that made him independent of the lord deputy's authority in Ulster. It was expected that the terror of the reputation he had gained in combatting the Spanish would be sufficient to cause the rebellion to collapse.

Norreys arrived at Waterford in May 1595, but was struck with malaria on disembarking. In June, he set out from Dublin with 2,900 men and artillery, with Russell trailing him through Dundalk. After flourishing his letters patent at Drogheda upon the proclamation of Aodh Mór Ó Néill, Chief of the Name of Clan O'Neill and Lord of Tír Eoghain, as guilty of high treason, Norreys made his headquarters at Newry and fortified Armagh cathedral. On learning that artillery was stored at Newry, O'Neill dismantled his stronghold at Dungannon castle and entered the field. Norreys camped his troops along the River Blackwater, while Clan O'Neill roamed the far bank; a ford was secured but no crossing was attempted because there was no harvest to destroy and a raid within enemy territory would have been futile.

So long as Russell was with the army, Norreys refused to assume full responsibility, which prompted the lord deputy to return to Dublin in July 1595, leaving his commander a free hand in the conquest of Ulster. But already, Norreys had misgivings: he thought the task impossible without reinforcements and accused Russell of thwarting him and of concealing from the London government the imperfections of the army. He informed the queen's secretary, Sir William Cecil, that the Ulster Clans were far superior in strength, arms and munitions to any he had previously encountered, and that the English needed commensurate reinforcement.

So quickly did the situation deteriorate, that Norreys declined to risk marching his troops 10 miles through the Moyry Pass, from Newry to Dundalk, choosing instead to move them by sea; but in a blow to his reputation, Russell confounded him later that summer by brazenly marching up to the Blackwater with little difficulty. More troops were shipped into Ireland, and the companies were ordered to take on 20 Irishmen apiece, which was admitted to be risky. But Norreys still complained that his units were made up of poor old ploughmen and rogues.

O'Neill presented Norreys with a written submission, but this was rejected on the advice of the Dublin council, owing to Aodh Mór O'Neill's demand for recognition of his supremacy over the Irish clans of Ulster. Norris could not draw his opponent out and decided to winter at Armagh, which he revictualled in September 1595. But a second trip was necessary because of a lack of draught horses, and on the return march, while fortifying a pass between Newry and Armagh, Norreys was wounded in the arm and side (and his brother too) at the Battle of Mullabrack near modern-day Markethill, where the Irish cavalry was noted to be more enterprising than Norreys had been expected. (Norreys had previously alleged that Irish cavalrymen were fit only to catch cows.) The rebels had also attacked in the Moyry pass upon the army's first arrival but had been repelled.

With approval from London, Norreys backed off Tyrone, for fear of Spanish and papal intervention, and a truce was arranged, to expire on 1 January 1596; this was extended to May. In the following year, a new arrangement was entered by Norreys at Dundalk, which Russell criticised since it allowed Tyrone to win time for outside intervention. To Russell's way of thinking, Norreys was too well affected to Tyrone, and his tendency to show mercy to the conquered was wholly unsuited to the circumstances. In May, Tyrone informed Norreys of his meeting with a Spaniard from a ship that had put into Killybegs, and assured him that he had refused such aid as had been offered by Philip II of Spain.

Owing to troubles in the province of Connaught, Norreys travelled there with Sir Geoffrey Fenton in June 1596 to parley with the local lords. He censured the presidential government of Sir Richard Bingham for having stirred up the lords into rebellion - although the influence of Tyrone's ally, Hugh Roe O'Donnell, in this respect was also recognised, especially since Sligo castle had lately fallen to the rebels. Bingham was suspended and detained in Dublin (he was later detained in the Fleet in London). However, during a campaign of six months, Norreys failed to restore peace to Connaught, and despite a nominal submission by the lords, hostilities broke out again as soon as he had returned north to Newry in December 1596.

At this point, Norreys was heartily sick of his situation. He sought to be recalled, citing poor health and the effect upon him of various controversies. As always, Russell weighed in with criticism and claimed that Norreys was feigning poor health in Athlone and seeking to have the lord deputy caught up in his failure. An analysis of this situation in October 1596, which was backed by the Earl of Essex, had it that Norreys' style was "to invite to dance and be merry upon false hopes of a hollow peace". This approach was in such contrast to Russell's instincts that there was a risk of collapse in the Irish government.

In the end, it was decided in late 1596 to remove both men from Ulster, sending Russell back to England and Norreys to Munster. Being unclear as to how Dublin wanted to deal with him, Norreys remained at Newry negotiating with Tyrone, while Russell was replaced as lord deputy by Thomas Burgh, 7th Baron Strabolgi. Burgh too had been on bad terms with Norreys during his tour of duty in the Low Countries, and was an Essex man to boot, a point which had grated with Cecil, who maintained his confidence in the experience command of Norreys. Although he did meet the new lord deputy at Dublin "with much counterfeit kindness", Norreys felt the new appointment as a disgrace upon himself.

== Death ==
Norreys returned to Munster to serve as president, but his health was fragile and he soon sought leave to give up his responsibilities. He complained that he had "lost more blood in her Majesty's service than any he knew". At his brother's house in Mallow, he developed gangrene, owing to poor treatment of old wounds, and was also suffering from a settled melancholia over the disregard by the crown of his 26 years’ service. On 3 September 1597 he went up to his chamber, where he died in the arms of his brother Thomas.

It was generally supposed that his death was caused by a broken heart. Another version, recounted by Philip O'Sullivan Beare, states that a servant boy, on seeing Norreys go into the chamber in the company of a shadowy figure, had listened at the door and heard the soldier enter a pact with the Devil. At midnight the pact was enforced, and on breaking in the door the next morning the frightened servants found that Norreys' head and upper chest were facing backwards.

Norreys' body was embalmed, and the queen sent a letter of condolence to his parents, who had by now lost several of their sons in the Irish service. He was interred in Yattendon Church, Berkshire) - a monument there has his helmet hanging above - and his effigy (portrait by Zucchero, engraved by J. Thane.) was placed on the Norreys monument in Westminster Abbey.

== Legacy ==
In 1600, during the course of the Nine Years' War, Sir Charles Blount, Lord Mountjoy, the commander who eventually defeated Tyrone, built a double-ditch fort between Newry and Armagh, which he named Mountnorris in honour of Norreys. It was built on a round earthwork believed to have been constructed by the Norse-Gaels on a site that Norreys had once considered in the course of his northern campaign.

Mountjoy referred to Norreys as his tutor in war, and took note of his former understanding that Gaelic Ireland was not to be brought under the control of the Crown except by force and large permanent garrisons. Norreys' conduct at the start of the Nine Years' War, however, suggests a mellowing during his maturity. The aggressive Earl of Essex – an equally ill-fated hero of the people – also chose to negotiate with Hugh Mór O'Neill, Lord of Tír Eoghain, and it was Norreys' original tactics that eventually succeeded in destroying the Irish clan system under Lord Mountjoy.

The most significant legacy of Norreys' long military career lay in his support of the Dutch revolt against the Habsburg forces, and later in keeping King Henri IV from having to concede the political independence of the Duchy of Brittany to Breton Catholic League leader Philippe Emmanuel, Duke of Mercœur, who had the military backing of Habsburg Spain.

In addition to his role in the destruction of both the Irish clans and Gaelic Ireland, the legacy of Norreys to Irish history was further cemented when the Roman Catholic priest he condemned to death and executed at Clonmel in 1585, Fr. Muiris Mac Ionrachtaigh, was beatified by Pope John Paul II, alongside 16 other Irish Catholic Martyrs of the Reformation in Ireland, on 27 September 1992.

== Family ==
Norreys never married, and he had no children.

Norreys is pronounced "Norr-iss".

== See also ==
- English Armada (Drake-Norris Expedition)

== Bibliography ==
- John S Nolan, Sir John Norreys and the Elizabethan Military World (University of Exeter, 1997) ISBN 0-85989-548-3
- Richard Bagwell, Ireland under the Tudors 3 vols. (London, 1885–1890)
- John O'Donovan (ed.) Annals of Ireland by the Four Masters (1851).
- Calendar of State Papers: Carew MSS. 6 vols (London, 1867–1873).
- Calendar of State Papers: Ireland (London)
- Nicholas Canny The Elizabethan Conquest of Ireland (Dublin, 1976); Kingdom and Colony (2002).
- Steven G. Ellis Tudor Ireland (London, 1985) ISBN 0-582-49341-2.
- Hiram Morgan Tyrone's War (1995).
- Standish O'Grady (ed.) "Pacata Hibernia" 2 vols. (London, 1896).
- Cyril Falls Elizabeth's Irish Wars (1950; reprint London, 1996) ISBN 0-09-477220-7.
- John, Bruce, ed. (1844). Correspondence of Robert Dudley, Earl of Leycester, during his Government of the Low Countries, in the Years 1585 and 1586. Camden Society.
- Lee, Sidney, ed. (1895). "Norris, John (1547?-1597)" . Dictionary of National Biography. Vol. 41. London: Smith, Elder & Co.
