= Edward Chamberlain (1480–1543) =

Sir Edward Chamberlain (or Chamberlayne) (1480 – 1543) of Shirburn Castle, Oxfordshire was an English soldier knight and Member of Parliament.

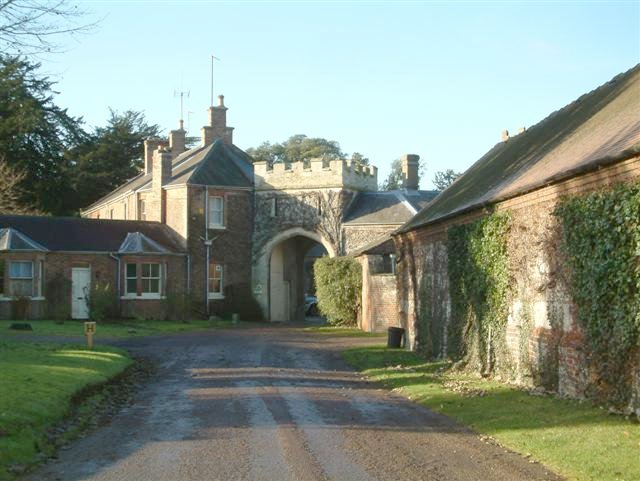
Shirburn Castle gatehouse, near Thame, Oxfordshire

He was born the eldest son of Richard Chamberlain of Coton, Northamptonshire and his wife Sybil Fowler and succeeded his father in 1497. His mother took out a lease on the Shirburn estate from her brother in 1505, which passed to Edward on her death in 1525.

He served as High Sheriff of Berkshire and Oxfordshire for 1505-06 and 1517–18. He was made Keeper of Woodstock Park in 1508 and an Esquire of the Body in 1509.

In 1512 he led 30 men in Sir William Sandys' company in an unsuccessful expedition to Biscay led by Thomas Grey, 2nd Marquess of Dorset to assist King Ferdinand's invasion of France. He then commanded a ship during naval hostilities early in 1513, joined the royal army in northern France in the summer, and was knighted at Tournai later that year.

He served at a royal banquet at Greenwich in July 1517 and in 1520 attended both Henry VIII's meeting with the King of France at the Field of Cloth of Gold and his subsequent meeting with the Charles V, Holy Roman Emperor at Gravelines.

He represented Wallingford in Parliament in 1529.

He died in 1543. He had married by 1504, Cecily, the daughter of Sir John Verney of Pendley, Hertfordshire, with whom he had at least 3 sons (Sir Leonard Chamberlain, Edward Chamberlain, and Sir Ralph} and 2 daughters. He was succeeded by Sir Leonard, who was assistant Lieutenant of the Tower of London and Lieutenant Governor of Guernsey.
