= John Williams, 1st Baron Williams of Thame =

The Right Honourable The Lord Williams of Thame Kt
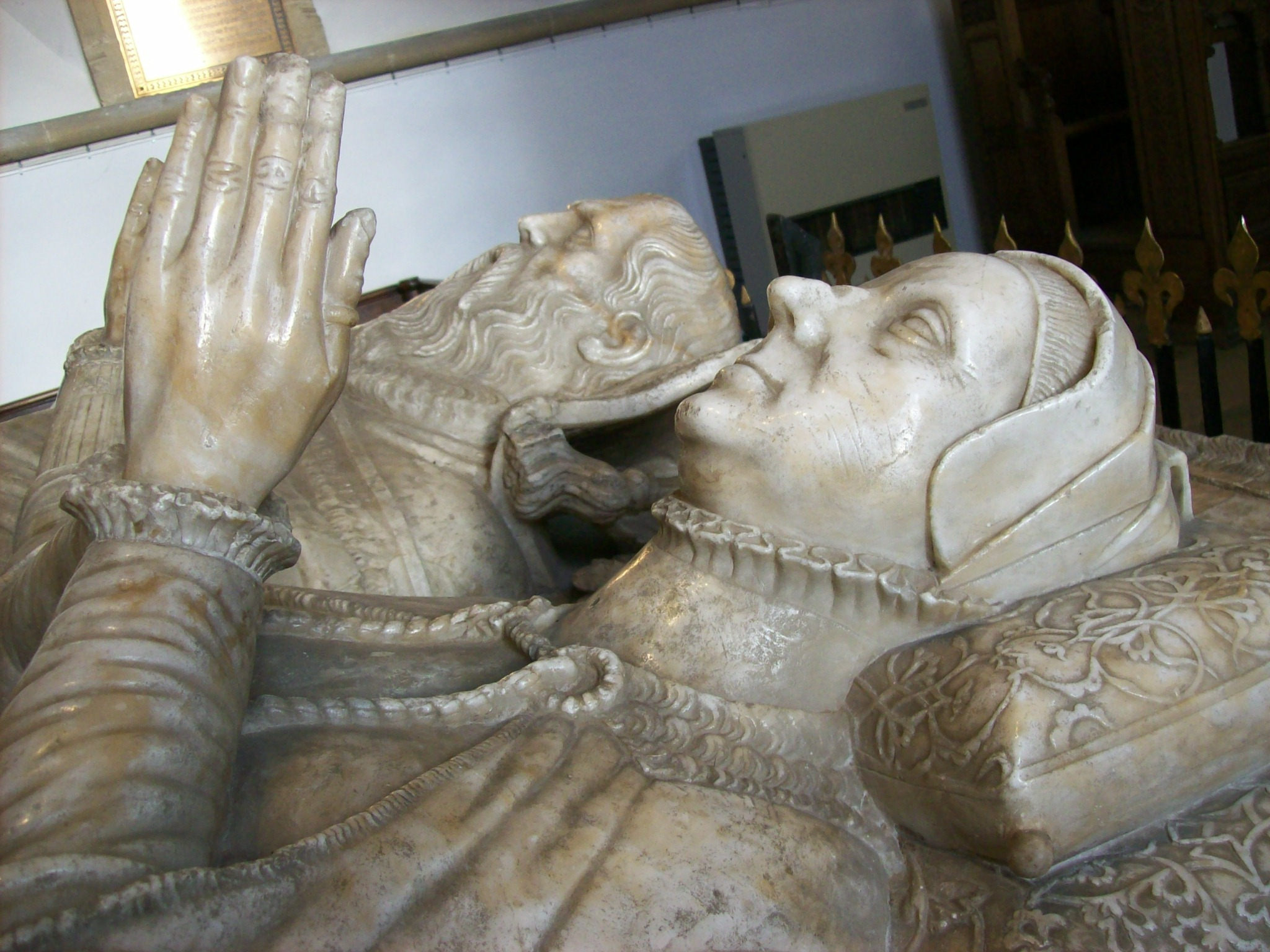
- Detail of tomb of Sir John Williams d 1559- and his wife. St Mary the Virgin, Thame

High Sheriff of Berkshire and Oxfordshire
- In office 1538–1539
- Monarch: Henry VIII
- Preceded by: Sir Simon Harcourt
- Succeeded by: Sir Richard Brydges

High Sheriff of Berkshire and Oxfordshire
- In office 1544–1545
- Monarch: Henry VIII
- Preceded by: William Fermor
- Succeeded by: Sir Humphrey Forster

High Sheriff of Berkshire and Oxfordshire
- In office 1553–1553
- Monarch: Mary I
- Preceded by: Sir Leonard Chamberlain
- Succeeded by: Sir John Brome

Personal details
- Born: c. 1500 Burghfield, Berkshire
- Died: 14 October 1559 (aged 58–59) Ludlow Castle
- Resting place: St Mary the Virgin, Thame, Oxfordshire; 51.7511°N 0.9818°W
- Spouse(s): Elizabeth Bledlow; Margaret Wentworth
- Children: John; Henry; Francis; Isabel; Margery

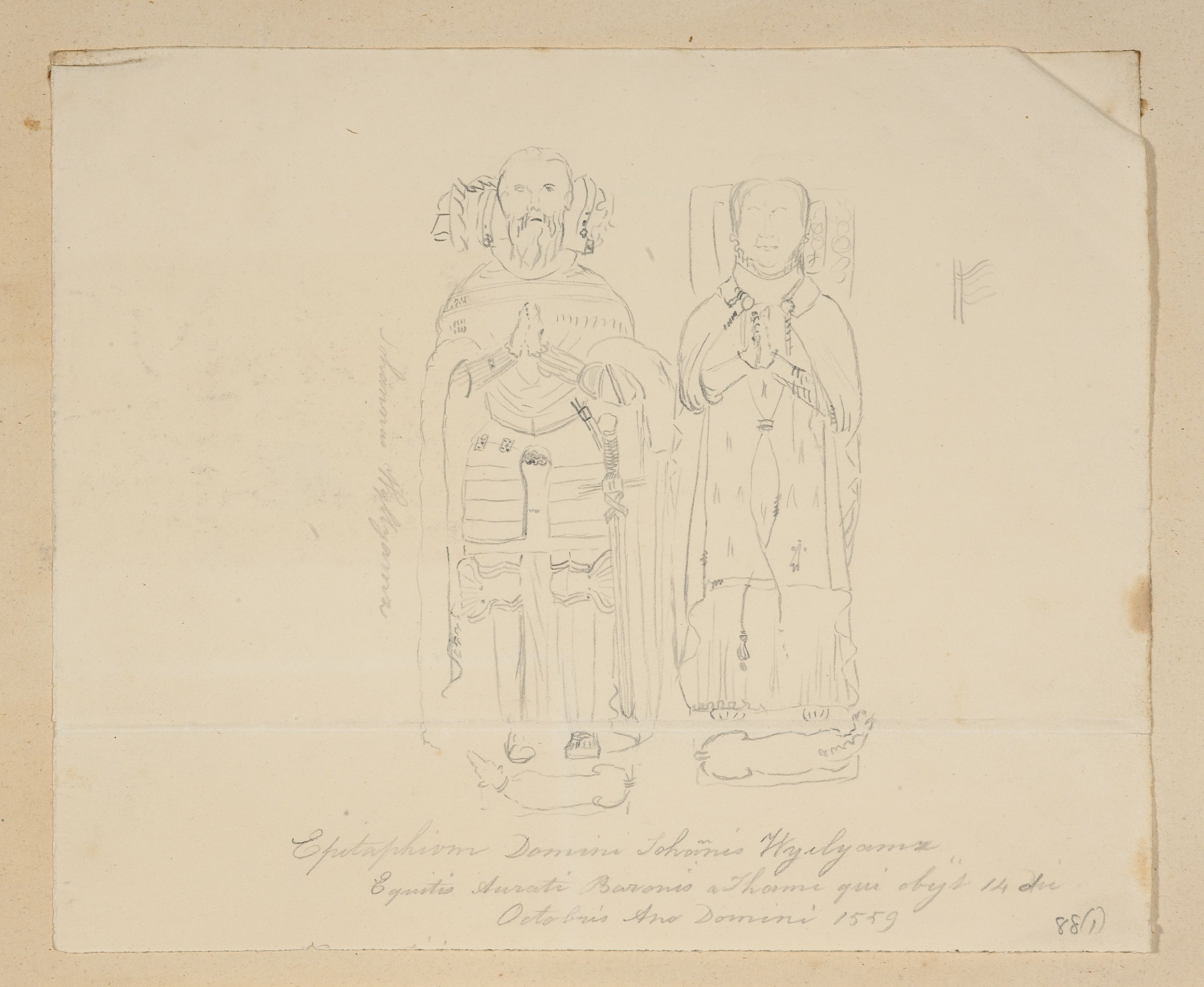
Lord Williams died at Ludlow Castle on 14 October 1559. His body having been returned to Rycote in preparation for a funeral held in Thame Church on 15 November, he was buried in this tomb.

John Williams, 1st Baron Williams of Thame (c. 1500 – 14 October 1559) was Master of the Jewels and Lord President of the Council of the Welsh Marches. He was summoned to parliament as Lord Williams of Thame on 17 February 1554.

== Life ==
Williams was the son of Sir John Williams of Burghfield in Berkshire, and his wife, Elizabeth, the daughter and eventual heiress of Richard Moore also of Burghfield and of Preston Candover in Hampshire. Williams, who was of Welsh descent, was a kinsman of Sir Richard Williams (alias Cromwell) whose father, Morgan Williams, married Thomas Cromwell's sister, Katherine. He is an alleged, but unproven great-grandson of Jasper Tudor, Duke of Bedford, making him third cousin to the English monarchs Edward VI, Mary I and Elizabeth I.

He became receiver of Thame Abbey in 1535. The Abbot of Thame, Robert King, was a relation by marriage. In the same year, he was appointed Treasurer of the King's Jewels jointly with Thomas Cromwell.

He was heavily involved in the Dissolution of the Monasteries and obtained Thame Abbey and its lands, and the Priory of Elsing Spittle in Cripplegate, London. He also had a palace at Rycote which Henry VIII and Catherine Howard visited on their honeymoon.

In 1541 there was a fire at the Priory of Elsing Spittle while Williams was in residence. The fire started in the long gallery and some of the king's jewels were damaged. Rebels targeted him in 1549 and killed the deer in his park. Under Edward VI his accounts as Master of the Jewel House and as Treasurer of the Court of Augmentations were audited and he was censured and imprisoned.

Later, he rose in favour with Queen Mary I for having declared for her party so early. Williams was appointed Chamberlain of the households of Mary and Philip in 1554. Williams, Ralph Chamberlain, and Henry Bedingfield escorted Mary's sister, Elizabeth I, from Woodstock Palace to Hampton Court in April 1555. Elizabeth liked Williams because he had been kind to her during her imprisonment.

He served as High Sheriff of Berkshire and Oxfordshire for 1538.

Williams died at Ludlow Castle on 14 October 1559 and his body was brought back to Rycote to lie in state in the great chamber of his mansion, then taken to Thame for burial.

Only a fragment of the stable of his house at Rycote survives, but there are engravings of the house by Henry Winstanley and Jan Kip.

Williams gave his name to the school he founded, Thame School, Thame, Oxfordshire, also known as Lord Williams's School, Thame. He bequeathed a sum of money to create an establishment of learning for all comers. The school was founded in 1559. The school has been a grammar school and is now a comprehensive school. The boarding element of the school closed in 1990.

== Marriages and issue ==
Williams married firstly, by July 1524, Elizabeth (c. 1504 – 25 October 1556), daughter and co-heiress of Thomas Bledlow of Bledlow in Buckinghamshire, a grandson of Thomas Bledlow and Elizabeth Starky (daughter of Sir Humphrey Starkey, Chief Baron of the Exchequer). Elizabeth Bledlow was the widow of Andrew Edmondes (d. 23 June 1523) of Cressing, Essex, by whom she had a son, Sir Christopher Edmondes (d. 1596), and two daughters, Ursula Edmondes and Frances Edmondes, who married John D'Oylie of Greenlands, Hambleden. By Elizabeth Bledlow, Williams had three sons, John, Henry and Francis, and two daughters, Isabel, who married Sir Richard Wenman, and Margery, who married Henry Norreys, 1st Baron Norris of Rycote.

Williams married secondly, on 19 April 1557, Margery Wentworth (d. 1587), the daughter of Thomas Wentworth, 1st Baron Wentworth of Nettlestead, Suffolk and Margaret Fortescue. She was listed as a lady at the court of Elizabeth I in 1559. She survived him, and later married Sir William Drury, and James Croft of Weston, Oxfordshire.

Williams's three sons predeceased him, and the barony became extinct at his death on 14 October 1559, although Lee gives this date and also says his eldest son survived him for four months, dying unmarried and without issue in February 1559. His elder daughter, Isabel, inherited Thame and married Richard Wenman and was the mother of Thomas Wenman, while his younger daughter, Margery, inherited Rycote.

== Notes ==
Political offices
Preceded by Sir Simon Harcourt	High Sheriff of Berkshire and Oxfordshire; 1538–1539	Succeeded by Sir Richard Brydges
Preceded by William Fermor	High Sheriff of Berkshire and Oxfordshire; 1544–1545	Succeeded by Sir Humphrey Forster
Preceded by Sir Leonard Chamberlain	High Sheriff of Berkshire and Oxfordshire; 1553	Succeeded by Sir John Brome
Peerage of England
New creation	Baron Williams of Thame; 1554–1559	Extinct
