= Elizabeth Wray, 3rd Baroness Norreys =

English noblewoman

The Right Honourable The Baroness Norreys
- Baroness Norreys of Rycote
- Tenure: 1622—1645
- Born: Elizabeth Norris c. 1603
- Died: 28 November 1645 (aged 41–42)
- Spouse: Edward Wray (m. 1622)
- Issue: Bridget Wray
- Parents: Francis Norris, 1st Earl of Berkshire; Bridget de Vere

Elizabeth Wray, 3rd Baroness Norreys (née Norris; c. 1603 – 28 November 1645), was an English noblewoman. She was the wife of Edward Wray, Groom of the Bedchamber to King James I of England, with whom she eloped in 1622, and incurred the king's displeasure as she was his ward. Elizabeth and her elopement was allegedly the inspiration for Orlando Gibbons' Fantazies.

== Family ==
Elizabeth was born around 1603, the only child of Francis Norris, 1st Earl of Berkshire, and Bridget de Vere, daughter of Edward de Vere, 17th Earl of Oxford, by Anne Cecil. Elizabeth's aunt was Elizabeth de Vere, Countess of Derby and Lord of Mann. Elizabeth had another aunt Lady Susan de Vere, whose husband Philip Herbert, 4th Earl of Pembroke was rumoured to have been Elizabeth's lover prior to her marriage.

== Elopement ==
In 1621, Elizabeth was being courted by Edward Wray, a Groom of the Bedchamber to King James. In January 1622, her father, who was estranged from her mother and had just been released from Fleet Prison (where he had been sent after a scuffle with another courtier in the presence of Prince Charles), committed suicide. His estates thereby became forfeit to the crown, and Elizabeth became the King's ward. Elizabeth gained the suo jure title of Baroness Norris of Rycote, and the King wished for her to marry Christopher Villiers, the brother of his favourite, George Villiers, 1st Duke of Buckingham. She was living with the Herberts, which gave rise to the rumour that she was the mistress of her aunt's husband, the Earl; and from there she eloped with Edward Wray on 27 March 1622.

They were married at St Mary Aldermary's Church. Following the ceremony, Elizabeth, fearful of the King's anger, went to the Fleet Street house of her half-uncle Henry de Vere, 18th Earl of Oxford for protection. When their elopement was discovered, Wray was placed under house arrest until February 1623, and lost his position at court. The Earl of Oxford was sent to the Tower of London. It was alleged that Elizabeth's elopement with Wray inspired composer Orlando Gibbons to write his Fantazies.

== Issue and succession ==
Eventually, Elizabeth and her husband were reunited. Together they had a daughter, Bridget Wray (12 May 1627- March 1657), who succeeded Elizabeth as suo jure Baroness Norris of Rycote. Bridget married Montagu Bertie, 2nd Earl of Lindsey, by whom she had issue (including James Bertie, 1st Earl of Abingdon, also 5th Baron Norreys of Rycote).

She was treated by the court physician Théodore de Mayerne in October 1635.

Elizabeth died in November 1645, aged about 42. She was buried on 28 November 1645.

Peerage of England
Preceded by Francis Norris	Baroness Norreys of Rycote; 1622–1645	Succeeded by Bridget Bertie
