= Elizabeth de Vere (disambiguation) =

Elizabeth de Vere may refer to:

- Elizabeth de Vere, Countess of Oxford, née Trussell
- Elizabeth Trentham, Countess of Oxford, married name de Vere
- Elizabeth de Vere, Countess of Derby, Lord of Mann (1575-1627), daughter of Edward de Vere, 17th Earl of Oxford
- Elizabeth de Vere (died 1375), daughter of John de Vere, 7th Earl of Oxford
