= Susan Herbert, Countess of Montgomery =

English court office holder

Susan Herbert
- Countess of Montgomery; Baroness Herbert of Shurland
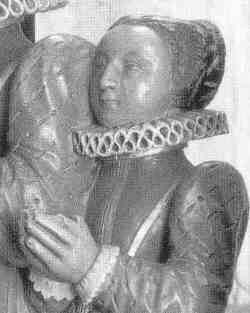
- Effigy of Lady Susan de Vere on her tomb in Westminster Abbey
- Born: 26 May 1587
- Died: 1629 (aged 41–42)
- Buried: Westminster Abbey
- Noble family: de Vere (by birth); Herbert (by marriage)
- Spouse: Philip Herbert, 4th Earl of Pembroke (m. 1604)
- Issue: Anna Sophia Dormer, Countess of Carnarvon; Sir Charles Herbert; Philip Herbert, 5th Earl of Pembroke; Hon. James Herbert
- Father: Edward de Vere, 17th Earl of Oxford
- Mother: Anne Cecil

Susan Herbert (née de Vere), Countess of Montgomery (26 May 1587 – 1629), was an English court office holder. She served as lady-in-waiting to the queen consort of England and Scotland, Anne of Denmark. She was the youngest daughter of Elizabethan courtier, and poet Edward de Vere, 17th Earl of Oxford.

== Family and early years ==
Lady Susan was born on 26 May 1587, the youngest daughter of Edward de Vere, 17th Earl of Oxford, and Anne Cecil, the daughter of statesman William Cecil, 1st Baron Burghley, Queen Elizabeth's chief advisor and leading member of her Privy Council. She had two older sisters, Lady Elizabeth and Lady Bridget. She also had an illegitimate half-brother, Edward, born out of wedlock to Anne Vavasour, who had an intimate relationship with the earl.

Following the death of Anne Cecil on 5 June 1588, a year after her birth, Susan and her sisters remained in the household of their maternal grandfather William Cecil, owner of Burghley House, where they received an excellent education. In 1591 Susan's father married for the second time to Elizabeth Trentham, who was the mother of Henry de Vere, later the 18th Earl of Oxford.

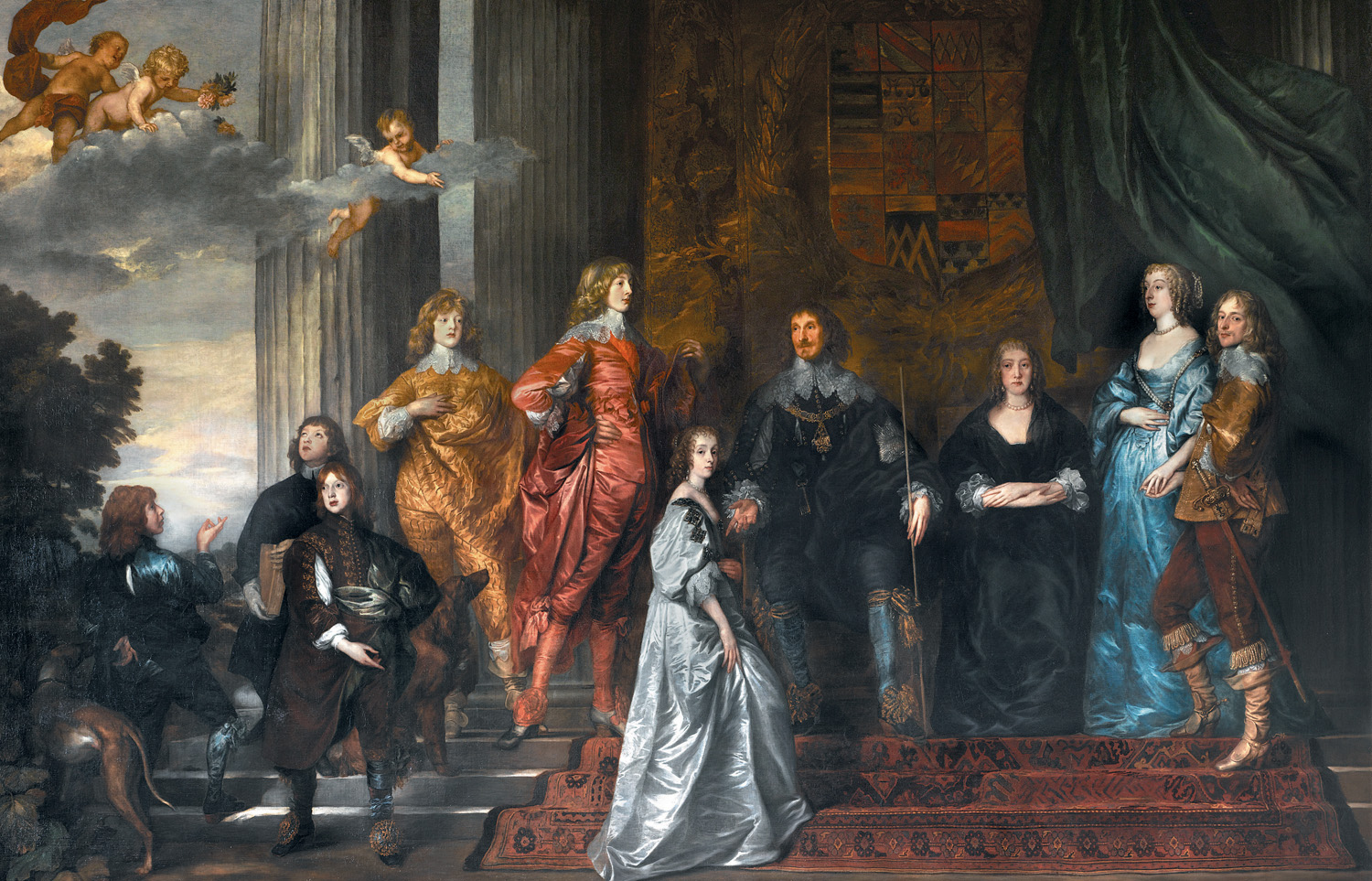
Philip Herbert, 4th Earl of Pembroke, with his Family, painted ca. 1634–35 by Anthony van Dyck.

In 1603 Robert Cecil placed her in the household of Anne of Denmark. Susan de Vere was "taken out" of the audience to dance at Hampton Court during The Masque of Indian and China Knights on 1 January 1604. The male masquers in costume included her future husband Philip Herbert and his brother William.

== Marriage and masques ==
Shortly after the death of her father, Susan married Philip Herbert at the royal court on 27 December 1604. Prince Henry and the Duke of Holstein escorted her to the chapel. The Queen followed and King James gave the bride away. The Venetian ambassador Nicolò Molin wrote that there was a banquet, but dancing afterwards was cancelled because of the crowds.

After supper a masque Juno and Hymenaeus was performed in the hall at Whitehall Palace by courtiers. Dudley Carleton was impressed by the masquers except Thomas Germain, who "had lead in his heels and sometimes forgot what he was a-doing".

According to Carleton, there some disorder and pilfering at the wedding masque, jewels and gold chains were lost, and some skirts. A few days later Lady Herbert appeared in the Masque of Blackness.

Philip Herbert was an English courtier and politician active during the reigns of James I and Charles I; he was the son of Mary Sidney. A year after their marriage King James created him Baron Herbert of Shurland and 1st Earl of Montgomery; in 1630, after Susan's death, he would succeed his older brother as 4th Earl of Pembroke. Philip Herbert and his older brother William Herbert, 3rd Earl of Pembroke were the "incomparable pair of brethren" to whom the First Folio of Shakespeare's collected works was dedicated in 1623.

At court, she played the part of "Flora" in The Vision of the Twelve Goddesses on 8 January 1604, "Malacia" in The Masque of Blackness on 5 January 1605, and on 5 June 1610 she danced at Whitehall Palace as the "Nymph of Severn" in the masque Tethys' Festival.

== Children ==
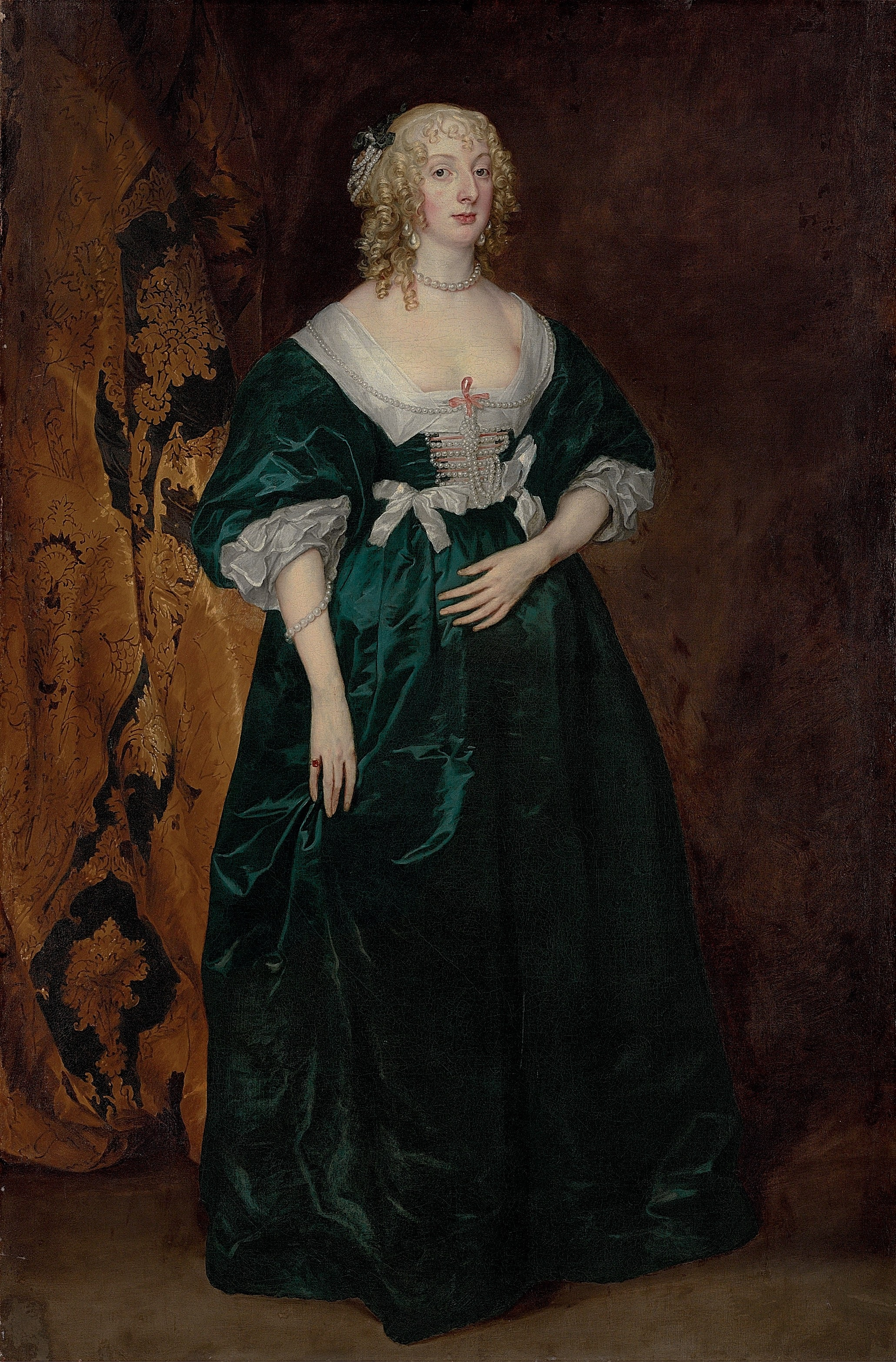
Lady Anne Sophia Herbert, daughter of the Earl of Pembroke. Anne was married to Robert Dormer, 1st Earl of Carnarvon.

- Lady Anna Sophia Herbert (died 1695), who married Robert Dormer, 1st Earl of Carnarvon, and had children.
- Sir Charles Herbert (c. 1619–1635), married Mary Villiers, daughter of George Villiers, 1st Duke of Buckingham, and had no children.
- Philip Herbert, 5th Earl of Pembroke (c. 1621–1669)
- Hon. James Herbert (c. 1623–1677), who married, first, Lady Catherine Osborne, and second, Jane Spiller, and had children from both marriages

== Death ==
She died in 1629 from smallpox, and was interred at Westminster Abbey, London.
