= Elizabeth Trentham, Countess of Oxford =

Elizabeth Trentham
- Countess of Oxford
- Born: Rocester, Staffordshire, England
- Died: c. December 1612
- Buried: Hackney, London, England
- Noble family: de Vere
- Spouse: Edward de Vere, 17th Earl of Oxford
- Issue: Henry de Vere, 18th Earl of Oxford
- Father: Thomas Trentham
- Mother: Jane Sneyd

Elizabeth de Vere, Countess of Oxford, formerly Elizabeth Trentham (d. c. December 1612), was the second wife of the Elizabethan courtier and poet Edward de Vere, 17th Earl of Oxford.

== Family and early years ==
Elizabeth Trentham was born at Rocester, Staffordshire, the daughter of Thomas Trentham and Jane Sneyd. Her father's will, made 19 October 1586, mentions his son and heir, Francis, another son, Thomas, and three daughters, Elizabeth, Dorothy and Katherine. Elizabeth's brother Francis married Katherine, the daughter of Ralph Sheldon of Beoley, and carried on the family line. Her younger brother, Thomas, died unmarried in 1605. Two of Elizabeth's sisters were already married when Thomas Trentham made his will in 1586, Dorothy to William Cooper of Thurgarton, and Katherine to Sir John Stanhope.

Thomas Trentham's reputation in the county is indicated by his appointment by the Privy Council as one of the "principal gentlemen in Staffordshire" to accompany Mary, Queen of Scots from her Staffordshire exile to her trial at Fotheringay Castle in 1586 (a trial at which the 17th Earl of Oxford sat on the jury).

== Later years and marriage ==
Elizabeth Trentham was Maid of Honour to Queen Elizabeth for at least ten years. Records indicate that she exchanged New Year's gifts with the Queen in 1584, 1588 and 1589, and she is listed as a Maid of Honour on a subsidy roll dated 10 November 1590. She was known at court as a beauty.

Edward de Vere, 17th Earl of Oxford had been in need of an heir and, hence, a wife since 5 June 1588, when his 31-year-old wife Anne Cecil died suddenly, leaving him no legitimate male heir. (His son Edward had been born to mistress Anne Vavasour, a maid of honor. Vavasour gave birth in the palace after concealing both the long affair and her entire pregnancy. Betraying the Queen's trust landed them both in the Tower of London.) Oxford had an immediate need for money. In the summer of 1590, he owed £11,445 to just one of his many impatient creditors, the Crown. The Bank of England's Inflation Calculator values his debt to the Crown at £3,986,734 today or $5.64 million US. Elizabeth Trentham was wealthy. Her father's will bequeathed her a dowry of £1000, payable at the rate of 500 marks a year for three years. It was a generous amount (£352,624.00 or $499,200.98 US today), but it was only a tenth of what Oxford owed the Queen.

The wedding of Trentham and Vere "may be dated to 27 December 1591 (at the latest) from a record of the Queen's gift to the new Countess, " 'geuen the Countess of Oxforde at her marridge the xxxvij of December Anno 34th." The newly married couple resided at Stoke Newington, where their son, Henry de Vere, was born on 24 February 1593.

On 2 September 1597 the Queen granted licence to the executors of Sir Rowland Hayward to sell King's Place in the Hackney in north London to Elizabeth Trentham, her brother Francis Trentham, her uncle Ralph Sneyd, and her cousin, Giles Yonge. The acquisition of King's Place by Elizabeth Trentham and her relatives placed it 'beyond the reach of Oxford's creditors'. King's Place was a substantial country manor house with a celebrated great hall, a classic Tudor long gallery, a chapel and "a proper lybrayre to laye bokes in"; the land comprised orchards and fine gardens and some 270 acres (1.1 km^{2}) of farmland. It would remain their principal London home until Oxford's death on 24 June 1604. The Countess sold King's Place on 1 April 1609 to Fulke Greville, removing to Canon Row in the parish of St Clement Danes.

In 1591 Oxford had sold Hedingham Castle, the de Vere family seat from the time of William the Conqueror, to his father-in-law, William Cecil, 1st Baron Burghley, in trust for Oxford's three daughters by his first wife, Anne Cecil, Elizabeth, Bridget and Susan. In 1609, Elizabeth Trentham repurchased Castle Hedingham from Oxford's daughters for her son, Henry de Vere (1593–1625), 18th Earl of Oxford.

Elizabeth Trentham's letters to Robert Cecil, 1st Earl of Salisbury reveal a sharp-minded, independent woman at ease with legal and business matters. According to John Chamberlain she was the custodian of Havering Palace.

== Issue ==
- Henry de Vere, 18th Earl of Oxford (1593–1625, aged 32). On 1 January 1624 he married Diana Cecil, daughter of William Cecil, 2nd Earl of Exeter and Elizabeth Drury, a beauty who brought him a fortune of £30,000, but died without issue.

== Death ==
The Dowager Countess died about 1 January 1613, and was buried 3 January 1613 at Hackney. Her will, dated 25 November 1612, includes generous bequests to her son, close family members, friends, servants, the poor of Hackney and Castle Hedingham, and various London prisons and hospitals. She appoints as executors her brother, Francis Trentham, and her friends Sir Edward More (d.1623) and John Wright of Gray's Inn.
