= Anne Cecil =

English writer (1556–1588)

The Right Honourable The Countess of Oxford
- Effigies of Anne and her mother. Anne's is on the raised shelf
- Born: 5 December 1556; England
- Died: 5 June 1588 (aged 31)
- Buried: Westminster Abbey
- Spouse: Edward de Vere, 17th Earl of Oxford (m. 1571)
- Issue: Elizabeth de Vere, Countess of Derby; Lord Bulbecke; Bridget Norris, Countess of Berkshire; Lady Frances de Vere; Susan Herbert, Countess of Montgomery
- Father: William Cecil, 1st Baron Burghley
- Mother: Mildred Cooke
- Occupation: Maid of Honour

Anne de Vere (née Cecil), Countess of Oxford (5 December 1556 – 5 June 1588) was the daughter of the statesman William Cecil, 1st Baron Burghley, chief adviser to Queen Elizabeth I of England, and the translator Mildred Cooke. In 1571 she became the first wife of Edward de Vere, 17th Earl of Oxford. She served as a Maid of Honour to Queen Elizabeth before her marriage.

== Life ==
Anne was born 5 December 1556, the elder daughter of William Cecil, later created 1st Baron Burghley, the leading member of Queen Elizabeth's Privy Council, by his second wife, Mildred Cooke, a woman noted for her learning and translations from the Greek. Anne was an intelligent, well-educated child. She is thought to have been tutored by William Lewin. She knew French, Latin and possibly Italian. A letter from the German scholar Johannes Sturm referred to her knowledge of Latin. Her father affectionately called her 'Tannakin'. William wrote a poem for Anne to accompany the gift of a spinning wheel in January 1567.

In 1569, Anne was engaged to marry Sir Philip Sidney. When these marriage negotiations failed, she instead married Edward de Vere, 17th Earl of Oxford on 16 December 1571 at Whitehall Palace, in the presence of Queen Elizabeth. It was a triple wedding with Edward Somerset, 4th Earl of Worcester and bride, Elizabeth Hastings and Edward Sutton, 4th Baron Dudley and bride, Mary Howard. The wedding was celebrated with great pomp. According to some accounts, Anne genuinely loved Oxford, who as her father's ward had partly grown up in the Cecil household. However, his reasons for marrying Anne were largely mercenary, as he had hoped her father would pay his many outstanding debts.

Following her marriage, Anne continued to live with her parents at Theobalds House. When she gave birth to her first child, Elizabeth, on 2 July 1575, Oxford was abroad touring the Continent. Upon his return, he accused Anne of adultery and declared the baby to have been fathered by another man, reputedly because Burghley failed to save his cousin, Thomas Howard, 4th Duke of Norfolk, from execution.

In April 1576 he separated from Anne, after rumours of her infidelity, and refused to sleep with her, recognise her or countenance her presence at court, despite Burghley's threats and public admonitions from Anne's mother. During his separation from Anne, Oxford began an affair with the Queen's Lady of the Bedchamber, Anne Vavasour. When the latter gave birth to his illegitimate son Edward in March 1581, both he and his mistress were sent to the Tower of London by the Queen's command. Oxford was soon released, and in December 1581 Anne began a correspondence with him; and by January 1582, he was reconciled with her, acknowledging the paternity of her daughter Elizabeth.

In his Pandora (1584), a work dedicated to her husband, the harpist and poetaster John Southern credited Anne with writing six elegiac poems memorialising her infant son, Lord Bulbecke, after his premature death as an infant in May 1583. Although this has been contested by Stephen May as the poems are written in Southern's style and draw heavily on his favourite poet, Philippe Desportes, Louise Schleiner has argued for Anne's authorship.

== Issue ==
Together Oxford and Anne Cecil had a total of five children:

- Lady Elizabeth de Vere (2 July 1575 – 10 March 1627); married William Stanley, 6th Earl of Derby, by whom she had issue.
- Lord Bulbecke (died May 1583 in early infancy)
- Lady Bridget de Vere (6 April 1584 – December 1630/March 1631); married Francis Norris, 1st Earl of Berkshire, by whom she had one daughter.
- Lady Frances de Vere (died as an infant on 12 September 1587)
- Lady Susan de Vere (26 May 1587 – January 1629); married Philip Herbert, 4th Earl of Pembroke, by whom she had issue.

== Death ==
Anne died 5 June 1588 at the age of 31 at the Queen's court at Greenwich, of unknown causes. She was buried in Westminster Abbey in a tomb which she shares with her mother, who died in 1589, and upon which is Anne's effigy. Her daughters were also later buried in the tomb. Her father was so stricken with grief at her death that he was unable to carry out his ministerial duties in the Privy Council. Her three young daughters remained in her father's household where they received excellent educations and eventually married into the peerage. Her husband remarried in 1591 Elizabeth Trentham, by whom he had his heir Henry de Vere, 18th Earl of Oxford.

== In fiction and film ==
Lady Anne was portrayed in the movie Anonymous (2011) by actresses Amy Kwolek (young Anne de Vere) and Helen Baxendale. The role is based on Lady Anne Cecil, but is heavily fictionalized.

Anne Cecil is the narrator in Peter Hildebrandt's alternate history novel, The Rest is Silence, the story of her husband, the 17th Earl of Oxford.
