= Thomas Bedingfield =

Thomas Bedingfield may refer to:

- Thomas Bedingfield (judge) (c. 1592–1661), English judge and politician
- Thomas Bedingfield (MP for Eye) (1554–1636), English lawyer and politician
- Thomas Bedingfield (d. 1613), gentleman pensioner to Elizabeth I of England
