= John Southern =

John Southern may refer to:

- John Southern (cricketer, born 1952), English cricketer for Hampshire
- John Dunlop Southern (1899–1972), Royal Navy officer and cricketer for Derbyshire
- John Southern (engineer) (c.1758–1815), English engineer
- John Southern (poet) (fl. 1584), English poet
