= Bridget Norris, Countess of Berkshire =

English noblewoman

Lady Bridget de Vere
- Countess of Berkshire; Lady Norris of Rycote; Viscountess Thame
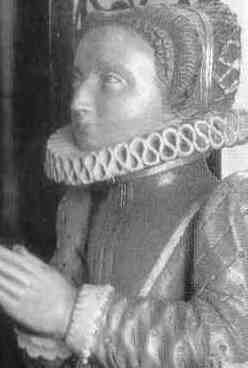
- Effigy of Bridget de Vere on her tomb
- Born: 6 April 1584; Theobalds House, Hertfordshire, England
- Died: December 1630 or March 1631 (disputed); aged 45–46
- Buried: Westminster Abbey
- Noble family: de Vere (by birth); Norris (by marriage)
- Spouse: Francis Norris, 1st Earl of Berkshire (m. 1599; died 1622)
- Issue: Elizabeth Wray, 3rd Baroness Norreys of Rycote
- Father: Edward de Vere, 17th Earl of Oxford
- Mother: Anne Cecil

Bridget Norris (née de Vere), Countess of Berkshire (6 April 1584 – December 1630/March 1631) was an English noblewoman, the daughter of Edward de Vere, 17th Earl of Oxford. Bridget was brought up by her maternal grandfather, the powerful statesman William Cecil, 1st Baron Burghley. She was also styled Lady Norris of Rycote and Viscountess Thame. She married Francis Norris, 1st Earl of Berkshire; however, the marriage was not a success, and they separated in 1606.

== Family ==
Lady Bridget was born on 6 April 1584 at Theobalds House, Hertfordshire. She was one of the three surviving daughters of courtier, playwright, and poet Edward de Vere, 17th Earl of Oxford, and Anne Cecil, daughter of Queen Elizabeth I of England's chief minister, William Cecil, 1st Baron Burghley. Bridget, along with her sisters, Lady Elizabeth and Lady Susan, remained in the household of her grandfather following the death of her mother on 5 June 1588, when she was four years old.

In 1591, Bridget's father married secondly, Elizabeth Trentham, a Maid of Honour to Queen Elizabeth. This marriage produced a half-brother for Bridget, Henry who became her father's heir, and later succeeded him as the 18th Earl of Oxford. Bridget already had an older illegitimate half-brother, Sir Edward de Vere, by her father's scandalous affair with the Queen's Lady of the Bedchamber, Anne Vavasour.

== Marriage ==
In 1597, Bridget's grandfather proposed to marry her to William Herbert, heir to the earldom of Pembroke. Burghley offered Herbert £3,000 plus an annuity, the payment of which would begin upon Burghley's death. Herbert, however, wanted immediate payment on the annuity, and when his proposal was rejected, he refused to marry Bridget. Baron Burghley was therefore compelled to settle for a less illustrious husband for Bridget.

On 28 April 1599, shortly after her 15th birthday, she married Francis Norris of Rycote, the son of Sir William Norris of Rycote and Elizabeth Morrison, and heir apparent to his grandfather Henry Norris, 1st Baron Norreys.

On 17 October 1601, Norris succeeded to the title of 2nd Baron Norris, and Bridget was henceforth styled as Lady Norris.

Together they had one daughter:

- Elizabeth Norris, Baroness Norris of Rycote (c. 1603- c. November 1645), married Edward Wray, Groom of the Bedchamber to King James I of England, by whom she had issue.

The marriage between Norris and Bridget was not successful, and in 1606, Bridget and her husband separated.

Bridget de Vere's second marriage was to Sir Hugh Pollard, 2nd Baronet. The eldest son of Sir Lewis Pollard, 1st Baronet. By him, she left an only daughter, Bridget Pollard.

== Last years ==
On 28 January 1621, Norris was created 1st Viscount Thame and 1st Earl of Berkshire.

At about the time Norris had been planning to divorce Bridget he was sent to Fleet Prison after elbowing and pushing Lord Scrope in front of the House of Lords in the presence of Prince Charles. Upon his release, he went home to Rycote in Oxfordshire where he committed suicide on 29 January 1622. His estates and titles became forfeit to the crown.

Bridget died sometime between December 1630 and March 1631, aged 46, and was buried in Westminster Abbey in a tomb which she shares with her mother, grandmother and sisters. Her effigy is on the tomb.
