= Baron Norreys =

English royal title

The title Baron Norreys of Rycote was created in the Peerage of England by writ for Sir Henry Norris in 1572. The 2nd Baron Norreys was created Viscount Thame and Earl of Berkshire, both titles became extinct on his death. After two female heirs in the 17th century, the barony of Norreys went to the family of Bertie, and its holder, the 5th Baron Norreys became Earl of Abingdon in 1682. Since that time, the barony Norreys of Rycote has been a subsidiary title of the Earls of Abingdon, who have become Earls of Lindsey in the 20th century.

== Barons Norreys of Rycote (1572) ==
- Henry Norris, 1st Baron Norreys (d. 1601)
- Francis Norris, 2nd Baron Norreys (1579–1622) (became Earl of Berkshire and Viscount Thame in 1622, one day before his death)
- Elizabeth Wray, 3rd Baroness Norreys (d. 1645)
- Bridget Bertie (née Wray), 4th Baroness Norreys (1627–1657)
- James Bertie, 5th Baron Norreys (1653–1699) (became 1st Earl of Abingdon in 1682)
- James Bertie, 1st Earl of Abingdon (1653–1699)
- Montagu Venables-Bertie, 2nd Earl of Abingdon (1672–1743)
- Willoughby Bertie, 3rd Earl of Abingdon (1692–1760)
- Willoughby Bertie, 4th Earl of Abingdon (1740–1799)
- Montagu Bertie, 5th Earl of Abingdon (1784–1854)
- Montagu Bertie, 6th Earl of Abingdon (1808–1884)
- Montagu Arthur Bertie, 7th Earl of Abingdon (1836–1928)
- Montagu Henry Edmund Towneley-Bertie, 8th Earl of Abingdon (1887–1963) (succeeded as 13th Earl of Lindsey in 1938)
- Richard Henry Rupert Bertie, 14th Earl of Lindsey, 9th Earl of Abingdon (b. 1931)

The heir apparent is the present holder's son Henry Mark Willoughby Bertie, Lord Norreys (b. 1958).
