= Fisher's Folly =

Former house in Bishopsgate, City of London

Coordinates: 51°31′00.9″N 0°04′49.3″W

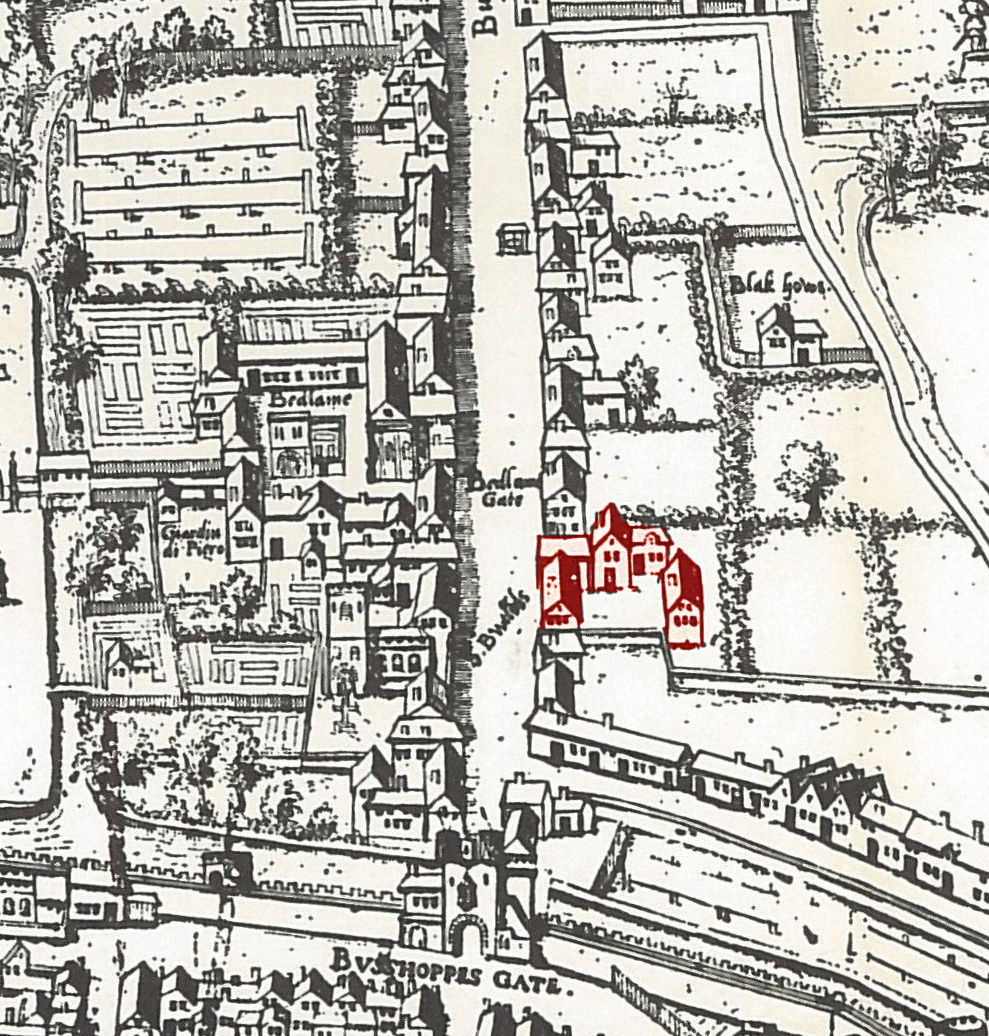
Fisher's Folly (marked in red) from the "Copperplate" map of London, c. 1553–59

Fisher's Folly was a large mansion on Bishopsgate Street, in Bishopsgate, London, built by Jasper Fisher in the 16th century.

== History ==
In his 1598 Survey of London, Stow reports that the home was "so large and sumptuosly builded" by a man deeply in debt that it became known as Fisher's Folly.

Despite his own excessive debt, Edward de Vere, Earl of Oxford bought the mansion in 1580. Oxford's biographer, Alan H. Nelson, quotes Stow's 1598 description of the house as "farre more large and beautifull" than its neighbors "with Gardens of pleasure, bowling Alleys, and such like." The Queen lodged at Fisher's Folly, though it's unclear whether she stayed at the home "before, during, or after Oxford's approximately eight-year-tenure."

William Cornwallis purchased the home from Oxford in 1588. Stow reports that a "Roger Manars"—presumably Roger Manners—owned the property by 1603. In the 17th century, the Earls of Devonshire owned it. By 1773, it had been mostly demolished. Approximately 45 metres (148 ft) of wall from the building survives behind buildings on Devonshire Row and is Grade II listed.

Today the location is still called Devonshire Square. It and nearby Devonshire Street and Devonshire Place all take their names from the Earls of Devonshire who called the place home more than three centuries ago.
