= Elizabeth Stanley, Countess of Derby =

English noblewoman, Lord of Mann from 1612 to 1627

Elizabeth Stanley
- Countess of Derby; Lord of Mann
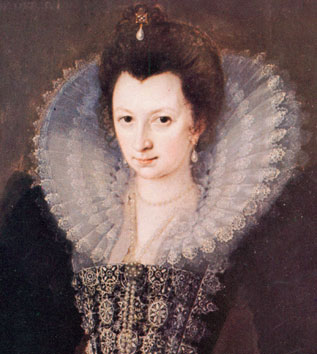
- Born: 2 July 1575; Theobalds House, Hertfordshire
- Died: 10 March 1627 (aged 51); Richmond, Surrey
- Buried: Westminster Abbey
- Noble family: de Vere (by birth); Stanley (by marriage)
- Spouse: William Stanley, 6th Earl of Derby (m. 1595)
- Issue: Lady Anne Stanley; James Stanley, 7th Earl of Derby; Sir Robert Stanley two daughters who died young
- Father: Edward de Vere, 17th Earl of Oxford
- Mother: Anne Cecil
- Occupation: Maid of Honour; Head of state and government administrator of the Isle of Man

Elizabeth Stanley (née de Vere), Countess of Derby, Lord of Mann (2 July 1575 – 10 March 1627), was an English noblewoman and courtier. She was the eldest daughter of the Elizabethan courtier and poet Edward de Vere, 17th Earl of Oxford.

She was the Lord of Mann from 1612 to 1627, and prior to holding the title, she had taken over many administrative duties appertaining to the Isle of Man's affairs. Elizabeth was the first female to rule as the island's head of state.

She served as a Maid of Honour to Queen Elizabeth I of England before her marriage to William Stanley, 6th Earl of Derby. Her wedding or (more likely) that of Elizabeth Carey to Thomas, son of Lord Berkeley, was the occasion for the first performance of William Shakespeare's A Midsummer Night's Dream.

== Family and early years ==
Elizabeth Vere was born on 2 July 1575 at Theobalds House, Hertfordshire, the eldest surviving daughter of Edward de Vere, 17th Earl of Oxford, and Anne Cecil, the daughter of statesman William Cecil, 1st Baron Burghley, Queen Elizabeth I's chief advisor and leading member of her Privy Council. Anne's mother was Mildred Cooke, Burghley's second wife, and Elizabeth was baptised on 10 July.

As Elizabeth's birth had occurred while her father was abroad on Grand Tour in France and Italy, upon his return to England he suspected her mother of adultery, and separated from her. They were later reconciled in January 1582, when Elizabeth was acknowledged as her father's child.

Elizabeth had two younger sisters, Bridget and Susan. Her brother, Lord Bulbecke, died in 1583 as an infant, and she had another sister, Frances, who died in 1587. She also had an illegitimate half-brother, Edward Vere, by her father's notorious affair with Anne Vavasour, the Queen's Lady of the Bedchamber. The birth of this child in March 1581 caused the arrest of both her father and his mistress.

Following the death of Anne Cecil on 5 June 1588, Elizabeth and her sisters remained in the household of their maternal grandfather, Lord Burghley, where they received an excellent education. In 1591 Elizabeth's father married secondly, Elizabeth Trentham, who on 24 February 1593 gave birth to a son, Henry, who would later succeed as 18th Earl of Oxford.

Lady Elizabeth went to court where she served as one of Queen Elizabeth's Maids of Honour. Burghley gave her a gold angel worth ten shillings to play at cards, to debut her career. She held this position until her marriage.

== Countess at court ==
By 1590 Burghley was negotiating with Anthony Browne, 1st Viscount Montague, and Mary Wriothesley, Countess of Southampton, for a marriage between Elizabeth and Henry Wriothesley, 3rd Earl of Southampton. However the match was not to Southampton's liking, and in a letter written in November 1594, about six weeks after Southampton had turned 21, the Jesuit Henry Garnet reported the rumour that 'The young Erle of Southampton refusing the Lady Veere payeth £5000 of present payment'.

Lord Burghley soon found Elizabeth another husband. On 26 January 1595, she married William Stanley, 6th Earl of Derby (1561 – 29 September 1642), at Greenwich Palace in the presence of Queen Elizabeth. It has been claimed that William Shakespeare wrote A Midsummer Night's Dream for the occasion of their wedding, and that the play was first performed at the wedding banquet, though the wedding of Sir Thomas Berkeley to Elizabeth Carey is the most popular candidate. In the early years of their marriage, the couple's relationship was tempestuous and there were persistent rumours that Elizabeth had had affairs with Robert Devereux, 2nd Earl of Essex, and Walter Ralegh. The allegations concerning her relationship with Essex were particularly strong in 1596 and 1597. Whether there was any truth in the rumours remains unknown.

Henry Lok wrote a sonnet to Elizabeth, published with Lok's other sonnets by Richard Field in 1597. Her husband was described as penning comedies for common players in 1599, and in 1601 she wrote to her uncle Robert Cecil against a ban on her husband's involvement in plays. The principal home of the Derbys was Knowsley Hall. Elizabeth returned to court as a Lady of the Drawing Chamber to Anne of Denmark in 1604, and introduced her younger sister Susan de Vere, later Countess of Montgomery, to the queen's household. Elizabeth danced in The Masque of Queens, and was the queen's chief mourner in 1619.

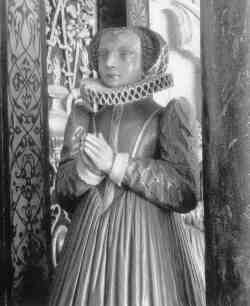
Sculpted figure of Elizabeth de Vere on the double tomb monument to her grandmother Mildred Cooke, Baroness Burghley and to her mother Anne de Vere (née Cecil), Countess of Oxford in Westminster Abbey.

As the Earls of Derby were the hereditary heads of state of the Isle of Man, Elizabeth's husband took up the title of Lord of Mann in 1609 following an Act of Parliament. Elizabeth began taking over many administrative duties relating to the Isle's political affairs. She attempted to influence business on behalf of the Isle, and wrote a letter on 15 September 1609 to her uncle Robert Cecil, regarding the shipment of money from the Isle of Mann. In 1612, Elizabeth was appointed the first female Lord of Mann, a title she held until her death in 1627. She was succeeded by her eldest son, James.

Elizabeth died on 10 March 1627 at Richmond, Surrey, and was buried the next day in Westminster Abbey, London. On her tomb, which she shares with her mother, grandmother, and sisters, is her effigy.

== Family ==
Elizabeth de Vere had five children;

- Lady Anne Stanley (c.1600 – February 1657), married firstly, Sir Henry Portman; secondly Robert Kerr, 1st Earl of Ancram, by whom she had issue.
- James Stanley, 7th Earl of Derby (31 January 1607 – 15 October 1651), married Charlotte de la Tremoille, by whom he had issue.
- Sir Robert Stanley (died 1632), married Elizabeth Gorges, by whom he had issue. His line eventually became extinct.
- Elizabeth Stanley (died young)
- Elizabeth Stanley (died young)

== Footnotes ==
Head of State of the Isle of Man
Preceded by William Stanley, 6th Earl of Derby	Lord of Mann; 1612–1627	Succeeded by James Stanley, 7th Earl of Derby
