= Edward Wray =

English courtier and politician

Member of Parliament for Oxfordshire
- In office 1625–1625

Personal details
- Born: 1589 Louth, Lincolnshire, England
- Died: March 21, 1658 Witham, England
- Spouse: Lady Elizabeth Norris (m. 1622)
- Children: 1
- Parent: Sir William Wray, 1st Baronet, of Glentworth (father)

Edward Wray (1589 - 21 March 1658) was an English courtier and politician who sat in the House of Commons in 1625.

== Early life ==
Wray was the third son of Sir William Wray, 1st Baronet, of Glentworth and was baptised at Louth, Lincolnshire on 9 November 1589. Early in life he became acquainted with George Villiers, Duke of Buckingham, who became a firm friend, and with whom he was a great favourite. In 1617, Villiers used his influence with James I of England to obtain for Wray the appointment of a Groom of the Bedchamber and Wray was in a fair way of becoming a great courtier.

== Contentious marriage ==
Wray was deeply attached for some time to Elizabeth Norris of Rycote, only daughter and heir of Francis Norris, 1st Earl of Berkshire. On 13 January 1621 Chamberlain wrote to his friend Carleton, "Lord Norris is to be Earl of Thame, on marrying and assuring his land to Edward Wray of the Bedchamber." Norris was made Earl of Berkshire but committed suicide two years afterwards leaving his only daughter one of the richest heiresses at Court. A formidable rival in the person of Christopher Villiers, brother of the Duke of Buckingham, appeared as a suitor for the lady's hand. Buckingham used his influence over the King to back his brother's suit and it is likely that the heiress would have been forced into the marriage, had not the lovers made a run-away match, in defiance of the King's displeasure. "The lady was very cunning and resolute, more in order to be rid of the one than from love of the other," wrote Chamberlain to Carleton on 30 March 1622. Thomas Eocke, in a letter to Carleton on the same date gave more particulars of this little romance. " The Earl of Berkshire's daughter, who was kept at the Earl of Montgomery's, got out of the house early, walked three miles on foot, and was then met and taken to Aldermary Church, where she married Mr Wray, of the Bedchamber; they thence went to the Earl of Oxford's house in Fleet Street, he being in the plot. Lord Montgomery sent to fetch her away, but Oxford would not give her up. His commission is taken from him, and Wray is put out of the Bedchamber." Lord Oxford was on unfriendly terras with Buckingham, and seems to have borne the brunt of his displeasure. Wray was imprisoned for several months, for on 15 February 1623, John Woodford wrote Sir Francis Nethersole that " Wray is set at liberty".

The elopement was allegedly the inspiration for Orlando Gibbons Fantazies.

== Political career ==
In 1625, Wray was elected Member of Parliament for Oxfordshire. If he expected a knighthood, Secretary Conway wrote him on 30 December 1625 stating that as there were already more Knights than were necessary, the King was resolved not to make any at his Coronation.

Wray lived thenceforth in retirement at Fritwell, Oxfordshire. He died at the age of 68 and was buried at Witham on 29 March 1658. He was described as "A man of great charity and piety".

== Family ==
By his wife, Lady Elizabeth Norris, he left one daughter, Bridget, who married Montagu Bertie, 2nd Earl of Lindsey.

Parliament of England
Preceded by Sir William Cope; Sir Henry Poole	Member of Parliament for Oxfordshire; 1625; With: Sir Richard Wenman	Succeeded by Hon. James Fiennes; Sir Thomas Wenman
