= Thomas Bedingfield (d. 1613) =

English translator and bodyguard to Elizabeth I

- Born: Oxburgh Hall, Norfolk, England
- Died: 11 August 1613; London
- Occupations: Honourable Band of Gentlemen Pensioners under Elizabeth I, Master of Tents and Pavilions under James I
- Known for: Translator

Thomas Bedingfield (died 11 August 1613), gentleman pensioner to Elizabeth I of England, was an English translator. He was born probably at the family manor, Oxburgh Hall in King's Lynn, Norfolk, the second son of Sir Henry Bedingfield (d. 1583), and Katherine (d. 1581), the daughter of Sir Roger Townshend. Sir Henry had served as the constable of the Tower during the time Elizabeth was imprisoned there and at Woodstock Palace under Queen Mary.

== Works ==
In 1573, Bedingfield published Cardanus Comforte translated into English, ostensibly at the command of the Edward de Vere, 17th Earl of Oxford. This was an English version of the De Consolatione (1542) of Girolamo Cardano. It includes a dedication to Oxford dated 1 January 1571–2, in which Bedingfield claims that he had not sought publication but was making his work public only under compulsion by Oxford. This is followed by a letter to the translator and a verse to the reader, both written by the Earl of Oxford, and to these succeed addresses to the reader in prose and verse by Thomas Churchyard.

In 1584, at the request of Henry Macwilliam, another gentleman pensioner from Norfolk, Bedingfield published The Art of Riding a translation of part of Book II of Claudio Corte's Il cavallarizzo. In the dedication Bedingfield makes the same claim of modesty toward publication as his did in Comforte. In 1588 he translated Niccolò Machiavelli's Florentine Histories, which was published in 1595 with a dedication to Sir Christopher Hatton. In the prefatory "To the reader," Bedingfield makes similar disclaimers about publication and argues for absolute monarchy as the best form of government.

== Death ==
Bedingfield died in London and was buried in St James's Church, Clerkenwell, where a monument was erected by his executor, John Skillicorn.
