= Anne Vavasour =

English maid of honour (c. 1560 – c. 1650)

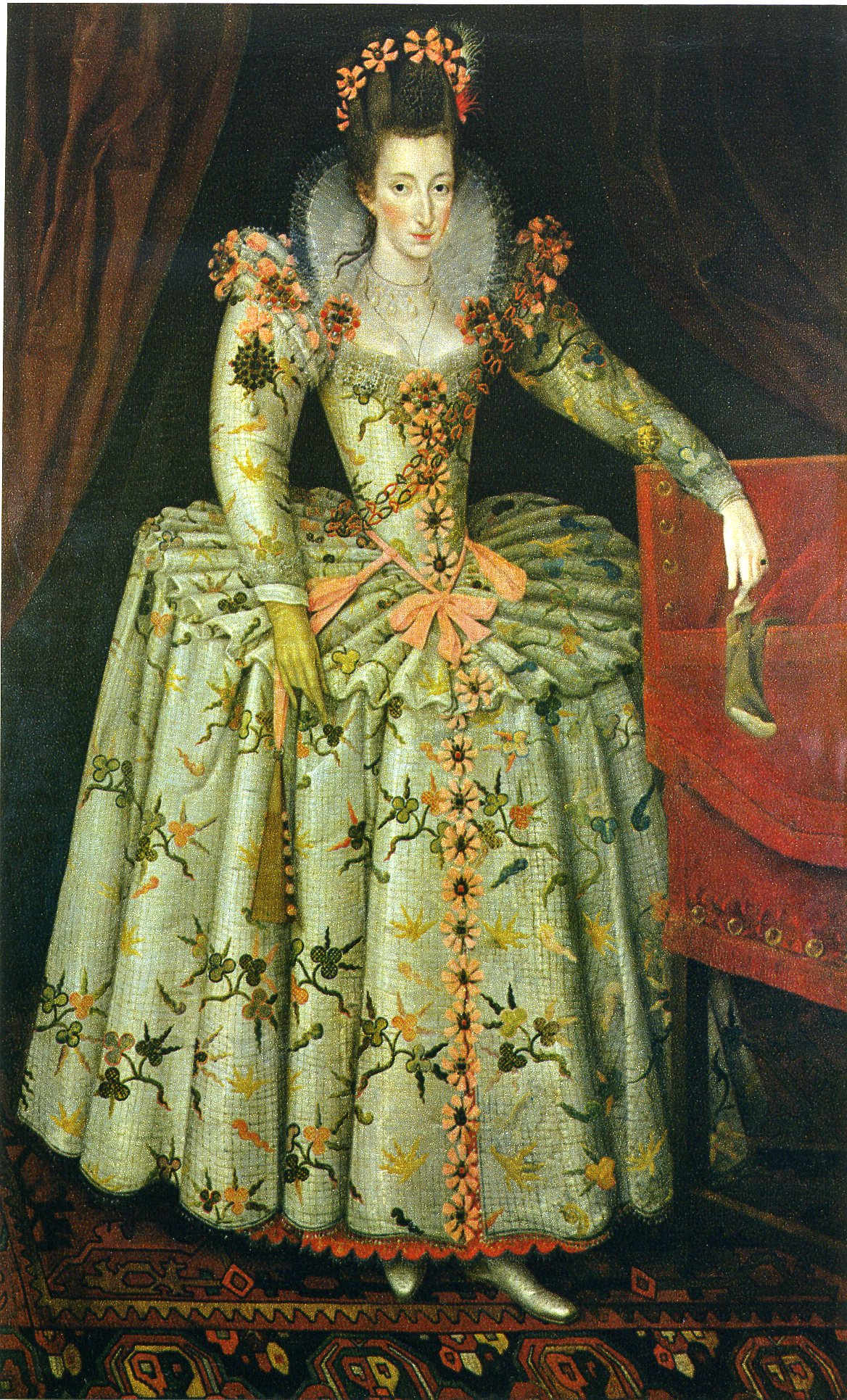
- Portrait of Anne Vavasour, attributed to John de Critz, c.1605
- Born: c. 1560; Copmanthorpe, Yorkshire, England
- Died: c. 1650
- Burial place: Aylesbury, Buckinghamshire, England
- Occupation: Maid of Honour
- Known for: Mistress of Edward de Vere, 17th Earl of Oxford, and later Sir Henry Lee of Ditchley; Protagonist of Earl of Oxford's poem, Anne Vavasour's Echo
- Spouses: John Finch; John Richardson
- Children: Edward Vere (illegitimate); Thomas Lee (illegitimate)
- Parent(s): Henry Vavasour; Margaret Knyvet
- Relatives: Thomas Knyvet, 1st Baron Knyvet (uncle)

Anne Vavasour (c. 1560 – c. 1650) was a maid of honour (1580–81) to Queen Elizabeth I of England, a member of the Vavasour family and the mistress of two aristocratic men. Her first lover was Edward de Vere, 17th Earl of Oxford, by whom she had an illegitimate son – Edward. For that offence, both she and de Vere were sent to the Tower of London by the orders of the Queen. She later became the mistress of Sir Henry Lee of Ditchley, by whom she had another illegitimate son.

By 1590, she had married a sea captain by the name of John Finch. She later married John Richardson, while her first husband was still alive; and as a consequence, she was brought up before the High Commission on a charge of bigamy, for which she had to pay a fine of £2000; however, she was spared having to perform a public penance.

She was the inspiration, protagonist, and possibly the actual author, of the poem, Anne Vavasour's Echo, though her lover the Earl of Oxford is more commonly identified as its author.

== Family and early life ==
Anne was born circa 1560, the daughter of Henry Vavasour of Tadcaster, Copmanthorpe, Yorkshire, and Margaret Knyvet. Anne's maternal uncle was Sir Thomas Knyvet, 1st Baron Knyvet. It was this family connection which likely secured her a place at court as one of Queen Elizabeth's Ladies of the Bedchamber. She was paid a yearly fee of £20 and was described as being "tall and dark-haired."

Her younger sister, Frances (1568 – c.1606), was also at court as a Maid of Honour to the Queen (1590–91), and in 1591 secretly married Sir Thomas Shirley. Her younger brother, Thomas Vavasour, also made a career at court and became embroiled in her scandals, challenging the Earl of Oxford to a duel in January 1585 (which does not appear to have taken place).

== Earl of Oxford's mistress ==
Shortly after her arrival at court, she became the mistress of Edward de Vere, 17th Earl of Oxford, who was married to Anne Cecil, the daughter of William Cecil, 1st Baron Burghley, the Queen's most trusted advisor. Oxford had separated from his wife in 1576.

On 23 March 1581, Anne gave birth to Oxford's illegitimate son, Edward, which resulted in their imprisonment in the Tower of London by the command of Queen Elizabeth, who was "furious" as "the persons of her maids were supposed to be sacrosanct." Oxford was released on 8 June 1581, but was banished from court until June 1583. He had reconciled with his wife, Anne Cecil in January 1582.

Their love affair also led to open skirmishes and duels in the streets of London, between Oxford and Anne's uncle, Thomas Knyvet. In March 1582, this led to Oxford being wounded, and his servant killed; reports conflict as to whether Knyvet was also injured. Another of Oxford's men was killed during a skirmish in January 1585.

Though her child, baptised Edward Vere, would survive to manhood, Oxford took no responsibility for his upbringing or education though did settle lands on him and gave £2000 to Anne. The boy was raised by Anne and she avowed to Sir Francis Walsingham that Oxford was the father of her son. In later years her son became a protégé of Oxford's cousin, Sir Francis Vere.

== Bigamy ==
Sometime before 1590, Anne married a sea captain by the name of John Finch. Around this time, she took another lover, Sir Henry Lee, Master of the Royal Armouries, by whom she had another illegitimate son, Thomas. They lived openly together at his manor of Ditchley. The Queen apparently approved of their liaison, as the couple entertained her at Ditchley House in September 1592. In 1605, Lee pensioned off Finch, and left Anne an income of £700 per year in his will, some property, and instructions for their joint burial in the tomb he had had erected for them in Quarrendon, Buckinghamshire. He had written an epitaph for the tomb which described her as having been: "a fair and worthy Dame".

Anne of Denmark visited Lee at a lodge near Ditchley known as the "Little Rest" and talked to Anne Vavasour on 15 September 1608. A few days later the queen sent her a jewel worth more than £100, which pleased Lee to see "his sweet-heart so graced". They remained together until his death in 1611.

Anne outlived Sir Henry, but was forced to engage in a series of legal battles with Sir Henry's son over the property he had left her. She was also held responsible for silver gilt and gold plate missing from the royal collection, including a gold bowl which had been a gift to Queen Elizabeth in 1575.

By 1618, she had married a second time to John Richardson. At this point John Finch reappeared and she was brought up before the High Commission on 8 August 1618 and charged with bigamy. On 1 February 1622, she was ordered to pay a fine of £2000, however she was spared the ordeal of performing a public penance.

She died in about 1650 at the advanced age of 90, and was buried at Quarrendon, near Aylesbury, in a chapel of which only a remnant of the outer wall now remains. Sir Henry's monument showed him lying down in armour with an effigy of Anne kneeling at his feet.

== Poems ==
Two poems, Though I seem strange sweet friend and Anne Vavasour's Echo, appear in collections of the work of the Earl of Oxford, Edward de Vere, but have been attributed to Vavasour in some manuscripts.

Anne Vavasour's Echo is written as if spoken by her as a series of questions. The last word of each line she says is echoed as the answer: e.g. "'who was the first that bred me to this fever?' echo: 'vere'".
