= Francis Norris, 1st Earl of Berkshire =

English nobleman and courtier under King James I

The Right Honourable The Earl of Berkshire
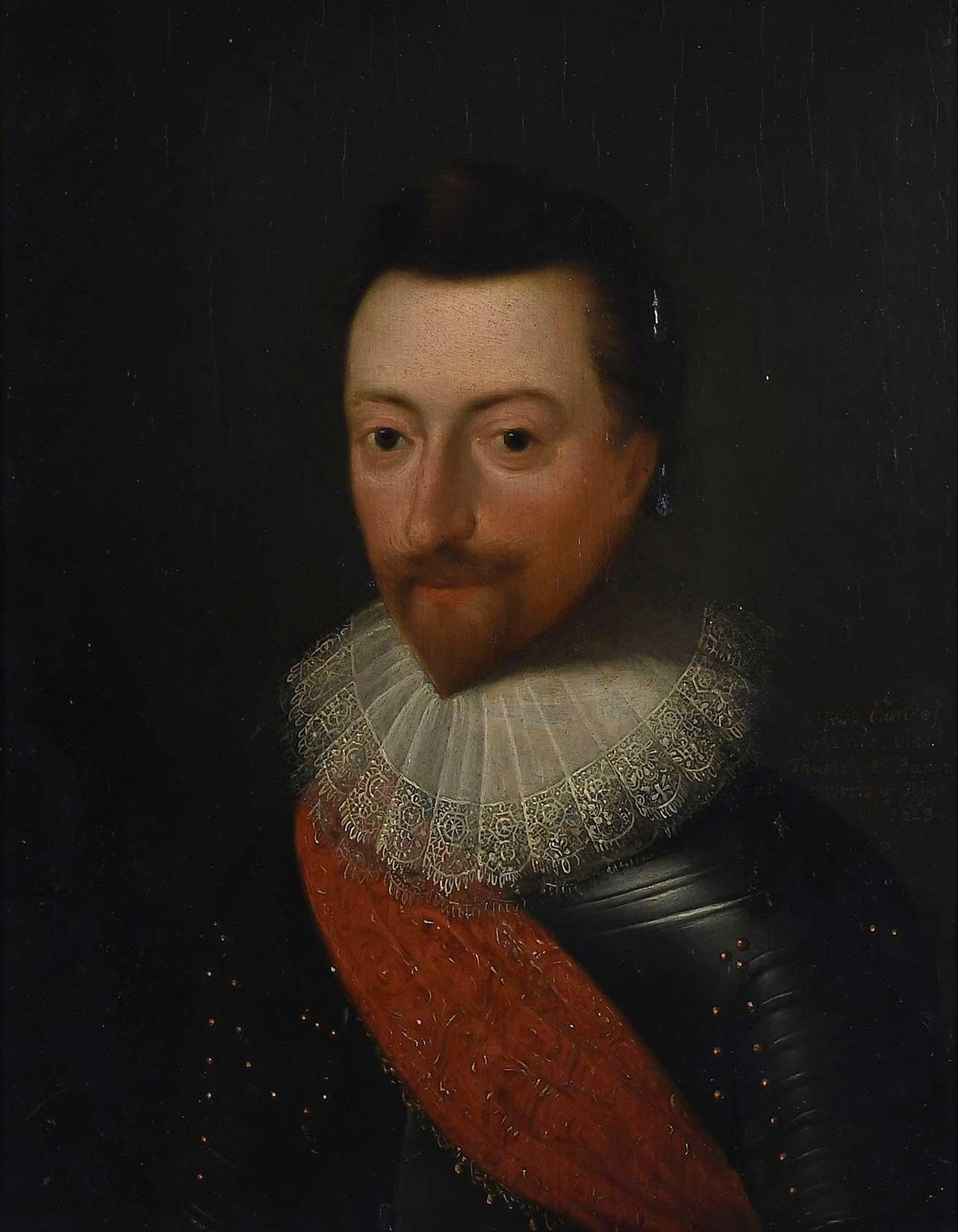
- Portrait of Francis Norris, 1st Earl of Berkshire from the circle of Marcus Gheeraerts the Younger
- Born: 6 July 1579; Wytham, Berkshire
- Died: 31 January 1622 (aged 42); Rycote, Oxfordshire
- Buried: Dorchester Abbey
- Spouse: Bridget de Vere (m. 1599)
- Issue: Elizabeth Norris
- Father: Sir William Norreys
- Mother: Elizabeth Morison

Francis Norris, 1st Earl of Berkshire (6 July 1579 – 31 January 1622) was an English nobleman and courtier.

== Biography ==
Norris (also spelled Norreys) was the son of Captain Sir William Norreys and Elizabeth Morison, daughter of Sir Richard Morrison of Cassiobury, Hertfordshire. He was born at Wytham in Berkshire (now Oxfordshire). Shortly after his birth, Norreys' father died; his mother subsequently received a letter of condolence from Elizabeth I.

In February 1598 Norris went to France on diplomatic service with Sir Robert Cecil. In 1599 he served in the fleet to repel a threatened Spanish invasion during the Anglo-Spanish War (1585–1604). In 1600, he inherited the title Baron Norreys from his grandfather, Henry Norris. At the same time he inherited large estates in Oxfordshire and Berkshire, which were added to upon the death of his uncle Sir Edward Norris in 1604. He was summoned to the House of Lords on 17 October 1601 and took his seat on 21 November.

On 24 March 1603 he signed the proclamation announcing the accession of James I in Oxford. In May, Henry Clinton, 2nd Earl of Lincoln and Francis Norris were sent north by the Privy Council to meet Anne of Denmark at Berwick-upon-Tweed and escort her towards London. However, at Doncaster and Northallerton they heard reports of a delay caused by the queen's illness at Stirling Castle, and sought permission from Robert Cecil to return home.

On 16 January 1605 he was made a Knight of the Bath at the creation of Prince Charles as Duke of York. In 1605 he entered Gray's Inn. In 1609 he gave oaks from his estate to aid in the construction of the Bodleian Library. In a clear sign of royal favour, Norris was present at the creation of Henry Frederick as prince of Wales in 1610, and later of Charles as prince of Wales in 1616.

In the autumn of 1613 he fought a duel with Peregrine Bertie, the result of a longstanding dispute with Bertie's brother, Lord Willoughby de Eresby. In September 1615 Willoughby and Norris met in a churchyard in Bath, and their retainers fought with swords. One of Willoughby's servants was slain, and Norris was tried and convicted of manslaughter. He was granted a pardon by the king.

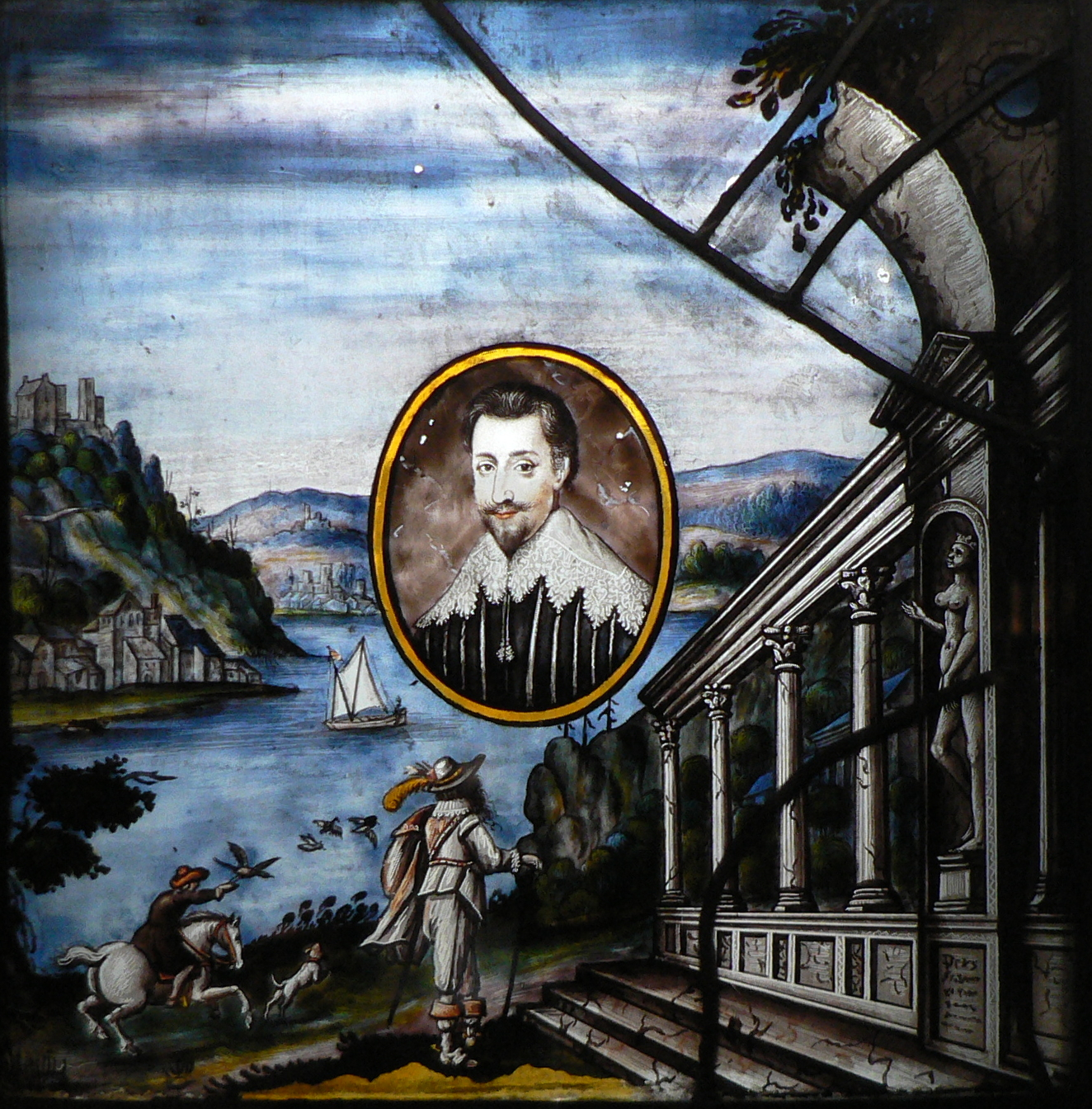
Stained glass portrait said to be of Francis Norris

On 28 January 1621, Norris was created Earl of Berkshire and Viscount Thame in the Peerage of England by the king, likely on the suggestion of the Duke of Buckingham. Shortly afterwards, on 16 February Norris attacked Lord Scrope in front of fellow members of the House of Lords. He was sent to Fleet Prison. After being released and returning to Oxfordshire, Norris was reputedly unable to recover from the humiliation and shot himself with a crossbow on 29 January 1622, dying two days later. He was buried at Dorchester Abbey.

=== Marriage and issue ===
He married Bridget de Vere, the daughter of Edward de Vere, 17th Earl of Oxford, on 28 April 1599, although the couple were living apart by 1606. Norris became so hostile towards his estranged wife that he not only starved her of cash, but also tried to disinherit their only issue, Elizabeth, who inherited the barony upon her father's death. Norris also had an illegitimate son, Francis, by Sarah Rose. He was knighted and appointed High Sheriff of Oxfordshire in 1636 and was the father of Sir Edward Norreys.

Peerage of England
New creation	Earl of Berkshire; 1621–1622	Extinct
New creation	Viscount Thame; 1621–1622	Extinct
Preceded by Henry Norris	Baron Norreys; 1601–1622	Succeeded by Elizabeth Norris
