= John Southern (poet) =

English poet (fl. 1584)

John Southern (or Soowthern; fl. 1584) was a minor English poet of the Elizabethan Age. Sidney Lee labes him a "poetaster".
