= Henry de Vere, 18th Earl of Oxford =

English aristocrat, courtier and soldier

Henry de Vere
- 18th Earl of Oxford
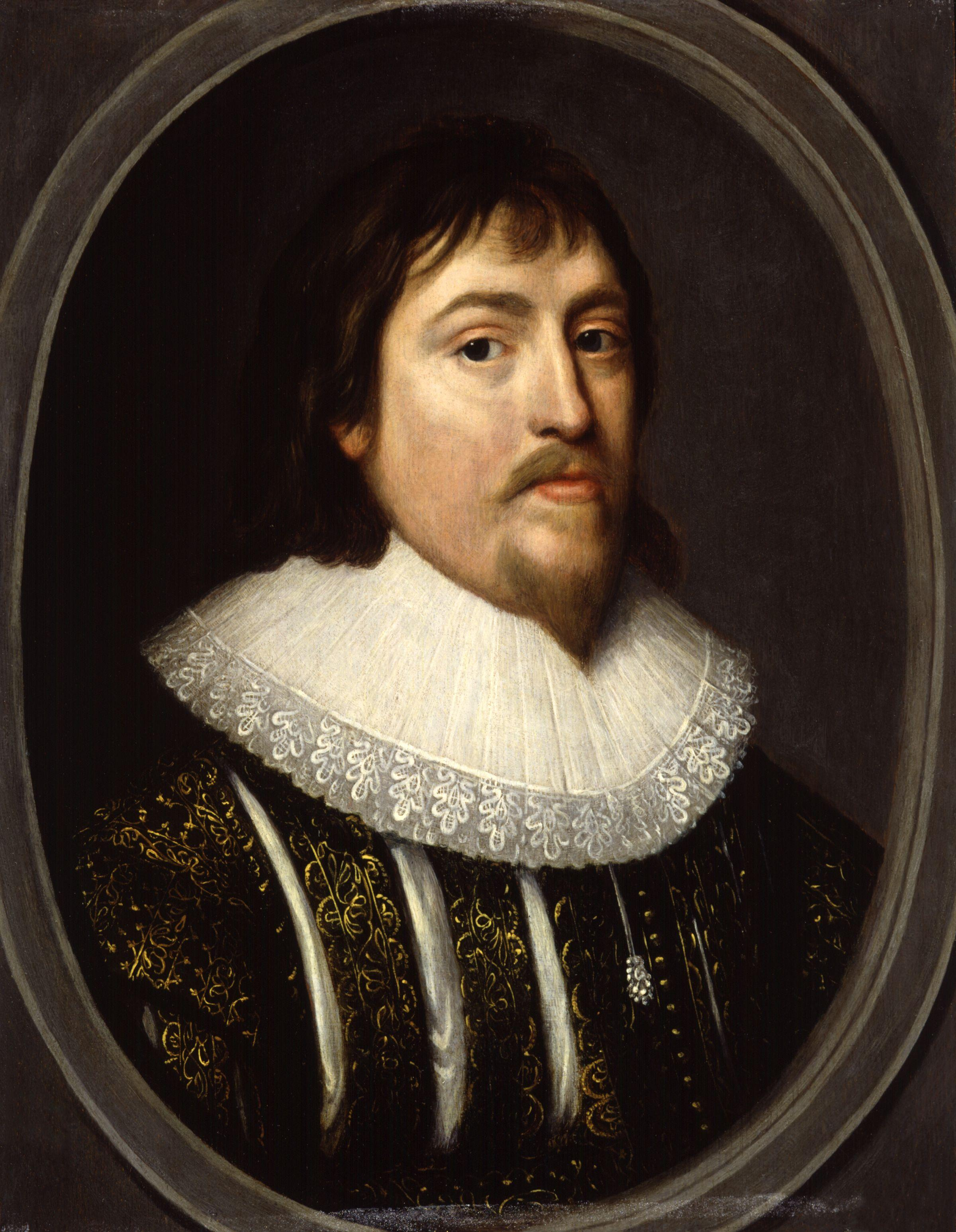
- Oil on panel (unknown artist; c. 1610–1615) National Portrait Gallery, London

18th Earl of Oxford
- Tenure: 24 June 1604 – June 1625
- Predecessor: Edward de Vere, 17th Earl of Oxford
- Successor: Robert de Vere, 19th Earl of Oxford
- Born: Henry de Vere; 24 February 1593; Stoke Newington, Middlesex, England
- Died: June 1625 (aged 32); The Hague Netherlands
- Buried: 25 July 1625; Westminster Abbey, London
- Noble family: de Vere
- Spouse: Lady Diana Cecil (m. 1624)
- Father: Edward de Vere, 17th Earl of Oxford
- Mother: Elizabeth Trentham, Countess of Oxford
- Occupation: Courtier, soldier

Henry de Vere, 18th Earl of Oxford KB (24 February 1593 – June 1625) was an English nobleman, courtier, and soldier. He inherited one of England’s oldest earldoms in 1604, joining a prominent aristocratic family with centuries of influence in English politics and society. De Vere served at the court of King James I, participating in ceremonial events, military campaigns, and diplomatic missions, reflecting the close connection between noble and royal service in early modern England. He was created a Knight of the Bath (KB) and married Lady Diana Cecil, though the couple had no children. Upon his death in 1625, the earldom passed to his second cousin, Robert de Vere, as the 19th Earl of Oxford.

== Life ==
He was born on 24 February 1593 at Stoke Newington, Middlesex, the only son of Edward de Vere, 17th Earl of Oxford, by his second wife, Elizabeth Trentham. He succeeded his father as earl on 24 June 1604.

He is said to have been educated at Oxford University. He was admitted a member of the Inner Temple in November 1604, and was created M.A. of Oxford on 30 August 1605. He was made a knight of the Bath on 3 June 1610, and keeper of Havering Park on 15 November 1611. In his youth, he had a reputation for debauchery.

On his mother's death, early in 1613, he inherited a share of her fortune, and set out on an extended foreign tour. From Brussels he made his way through France to Italy. At Venice in 1617 he offered to raise a body of volunteers for the service of the republic, and he exerted himself to obtain the release of his kinsman Sidney Bertie, who had fallen into the hands of the Inquisition at Ancona.

While Oxford was still abroad, he was involved vicariously in a tangled family drama. Against the wishes of Sir Edward Coke, Lady Hatton, Coke's wife, offered Oxford the hand of her daughter Frances Coke, whom the king wished to marry to Sir John Villiers, the brother of George Villiers, 1st Duke of Buckingham. Lady Hatton was in fact obstructing Coke's plan to improve his standing at court, with Buckingham; she did this by claiming Frances was already promised to Oxford, and by placing Frances out of reach in houses of allies. This failed matchmaking laid the seeds of a future quarrel between Buckingham and Oxford, though the Villier's marriage for Frances went ahead in September 1617. Oxford returned to England in October 1618. On 22 May 1619 he was admitted to the hereditary office of Lord Great Chamberlain.

Between June and November 1620 he served under his kinsman, Sir Horatio Vere in the Palatinate, and on his return home was appointed, in January 1621, to the council of war that was ordered to determine the aid that England would render Frederick V, Elector Palatine. In July 1621 an incautious expression of dissatisfaction with the Spanish match led to a few weeks' imprisonment in the Tower of London. In December 1621 he was nominated by Buckingham to command the Assurance, a vessel that was commissioned to guard the Channel. He captured a Dutch Indiaman, which he had to restore. He served at sea until March 1622, but was removed from command for interfering when Buckingham's brother, Christopher Villiers, sought to marry Oxford's cousin, Elizabeth Norris, the daughter of Oxford's half-sister, Bridget de Vere, and Francis Norris, 1st Earl of Berkshire. Oxford was said to have stated that he 'hoped the time would come when justice would be free, and not pass only through Buckingham's hands'. For this statement, Oxford was sent to the Tower, and King James ordered his attorney-general to prosecute him in the Star Chamber. Oxford was kept a close prisoner for twenty months, despite repeated efforts by his friends to gain his release. He was finally freed on 30 December 1623 at the behest of Prince Charles and Buckingham himself, 'hoping to smooth the waters before the upcoming parliamentary session'.

== Marriage ==
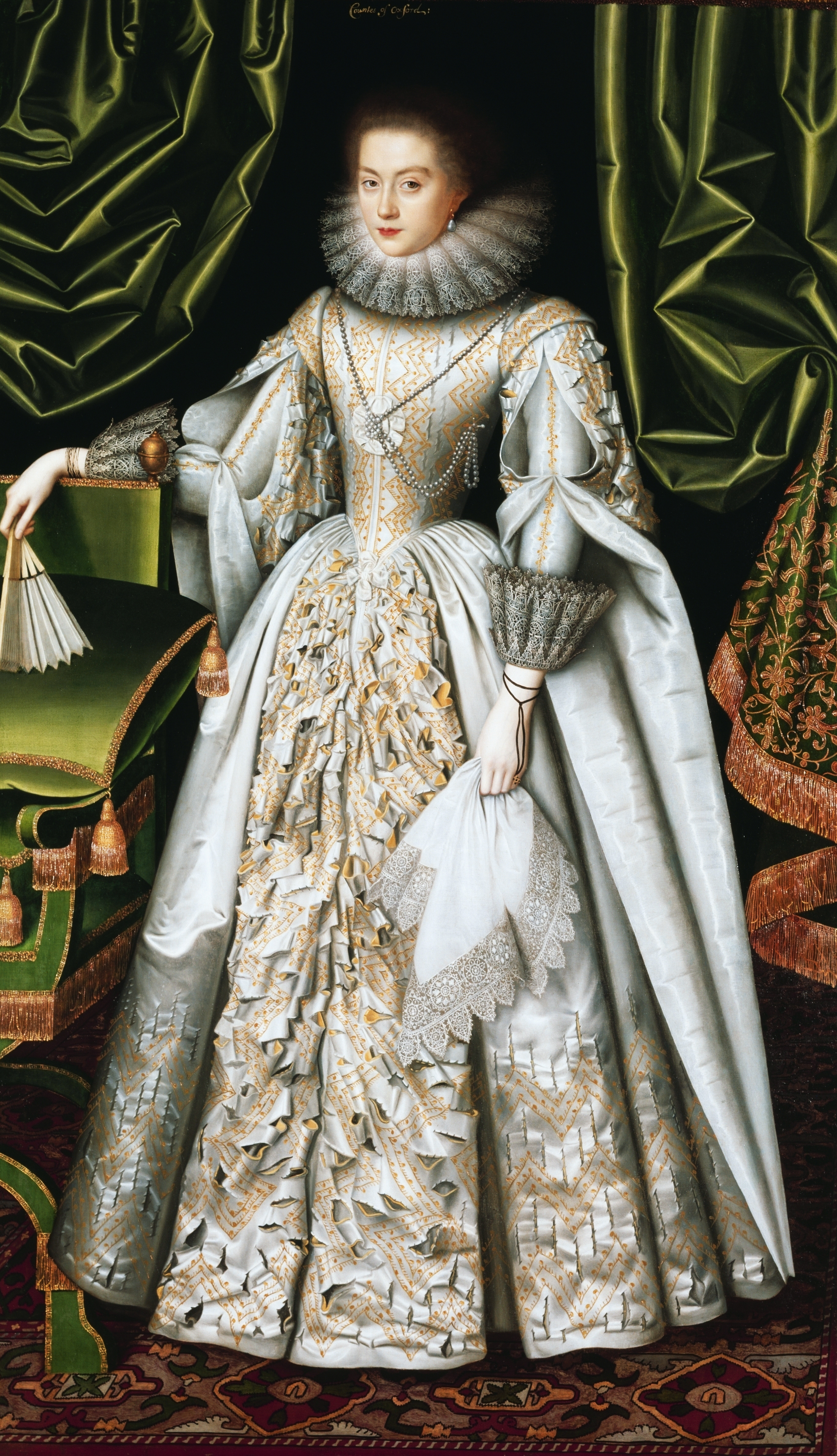
Lady Diana Cecil in 1614, portrait by William Larkin

Immediately afterwards (1 January 1624) Oxford married Lady Diana Cecil, daughter of William Cecil, 2nd Earl of Exeter and Elizabeth Drury, a beauty who brought him a fortune of £30,000. Francis Bacon in his disgrace asked favours in an obsequious letter which he addressed to the Earl in the month of his marriage. Oxford declined a reconciliation with Buckingham.

== Death ==
In June 1624 he went to the Low Countries as colonel of a volunteer regiment of foot that was raised for the service of the Elector Palatine. He was present in June at the unsuccessful assault on Ter-heiden, in connection with the operations to relieve Breda but soon afterwards died at The Hague of fever. He was buried in Westminster Abbey on 25 July 1625. He left no issue, and was succeeded by a second cousin, Robert de Vere. An elegy to him was written by the poet Abraham Holland and published after Abraham Holland's death by his brother, the printer Henry Holland in a collection entitled Hollandi Posthuma.

== Notes ==
Peerage of England
Preceded by Edward de Vere	Earl of Oxford; 1604–1625	Succeeded by Robert de Vere
