= Grade I listed buildings in Berkshire =

Berkshire shown within England

There are approximately 372,905 listed buildings in England and 2.5% of these are Grade I. This page is a list of these buildings in the county of Berkshire, ordered by building name within place name within district.

== Bracknell Forest ==
| Name | Location | Type | Completed (Note: The date given is the date used by Historic England as significant for the initial building or that of an important part in the structure's description.) | Date designated | Grid ref. (Note: The grid reference is based on the British national grid reference system, sometimes known as OSGB36, used by the Ordnance Survey.) Geo-coordinates | Entry number (Note: The "List Entry Number" is a unique number assigned to each listed building and scheduled monument by Historic England.) | Image |
|---|---|---|---|---|---|---|---|
| Grotto in the Grounds of Ascot Place to South of House at West end of lake | Winkfield | Grotto | c. 1750 | 20 December 1972 | SU9131171181; 51°25′56″N 0°41′16″W | 1390475 | Grotto in the Grounds of Ascot Place to South of House at West end of lake More images |

== Reading ==
| Name | Location | Type | Completed | Date designated | Grid ref. Geo-coordinates | Entry number | Image |
|---|---|---|---|---|---|---|---|
| Abbey Gate | The Forbury, Reading | Abbey gatehouse | 12th century to 14th century | 22 March 1957 | SU7188273556; 51°27′23″N 0°58′01″W | 1155691 | Abbey Gate More images |
| St Laurence's Church and churchyard | Reading | Church | Dated 1727 | 22 March 1957 | SU7170873548; 51°27′23″N 0°58′10″W | 1113532 | St Laurence's Church and churchyard More images |
| Reading Minster | Reading | Church | Norman | 22 March 1957 | SU7141173318; 51°27′16″N 0°58′25″W | 1113573 | Reading Minster More images |
| Greyfriars Church | Friar Street | Church | In use 18th Century | 22 March 1957 | SU7121073589; 51°27′25″N 0°58′35″W | 1321952 | Greyfriars Church More images |
| Large barn to south-east of Chazey Court farmhouse | Caversham | Barn | Late C17/early 18th century | 24 October 1951 | SU6915775161; 51°28′16″N 1°00′21″W | 1113603 | Large barn to south-east of Chazey Court farmhouse More images |
| Reading Abbey Ruins | Forbury Gardens | Abbey | Now ruined | 22 March 1957 | SU7200273549; 51°27′23″N 0°57′54″W | 1113477 | Reading Abbey Ruins More images |

== Slough ==
| Name | Location | Type | Completed | Date designated | Grid ref. Geo-coordinates | Entry number | Image |
|---|---|---|---|---|---|---|---|
| Baylis House, including forecourt walls and pavilions adjoining to North East | Stoke Poges Lane | House | c. 1695 | 29 September 1950 | SU9694780868; 51°31′06″N 0°36′15″W | 1113389 | Baylis House, including forecourt walls and pavilions adjoining to North East More images |
| Church of St Laurence | Upton Court Road, Upton-cum-Chalvey | Church | Early 12th century | 29 September 1950 | SU9807479094; 51°30′08″N 0°35′18″W | 1251379 | Church of St Laurence More images |
| Church of St Mary, Langley | St Mary's Road | Church | 1623 | 29 September 1950 | TQ0048379533; 51°30′21″N 0°33′13″W | 1135750 | Church of St Mary, Langley More images |
| Former Service Block Adjoining Baylis House to North East | Stoke Poges Lane | Training College | 1984 | 29 September 1950 | SU9697280892; 51°31′07″N 0°36′14″W | 1251374 | Upload Photo |
| Stable approximately 40 Metres to North of Baylis House | Godolphin Court, Stoke Poges Lane | Stable | Mid to Late 18th century | 29 September 1950 | SU9697280918; 51°31′08″N 0°36′14″W | 1313126 | Stable approximately 40 Metres to North of Baylis House More images |

== West Berkshire ==
| Name | Location | Type | Completed | Date designated | Grid ref. Geo-coordinates | Entry number | Image |
|---|---|---|---|---|---|---|---|
| Church of St Mary | Church Road, Aldermaston | Church | 12th century | 14 April 1967 | SU5965564975; 51°22′51″N 1°08′39″W | 1117319 | Church of St Mary More images |
| Church of St Mary | Parsonage Green, Aldworth | Church | 12th century | 24 November 1966 | SU5540379381; 51°30′38″N 1°12′11″W | 1313119 | Church of St Mary More images |
| Church of St Clement | Church Lane, Ashampstead | Church | Early 13th century | 14 April 1967 | SU5641876793; 51°29′14″N 1°11′20″W | 1212118 | Church of St Clement More images |
| Basildon Park | Basildon | Country House | 1776–83 | 14 April 1967 | SU6107778160; 51°29′57″N 1°07′17″W | 1221097 | Basildon Park More images |
| Church of St Bartholemew | Basildon | Church | Late 13th century | 14 April 1967 | SU6116679270; 51°30′33″N 1°07′12″W | 1221092 | Church of St Bartholemew More images |
| Church of St Nicholas | Beedon | Church | Early 13th century | 24 November 1966 | SU4823678125; 51°30′00″N 1°18′23″W | 1136040 | Church of St Nicholas More images |
| Church of St Mary | Bucklebury | Church | c. 1450 | 14 April 1967 | SU5530470867; 51°26′03″N 1°12′21″W | 1212695 | Church of St Mary More images |
| Church of St Margaret | Catmore | Church | 12th century | 24 November 1966 | SU4539080164; 51°31′07″N 1°20′50″W | 1210997 | Church of St Margaret More images |
| Church of St Andrew | Mount Lane, Chaddleworth | Church | 1742 | 24 November 1966 | SU4115277924; 51°29′56″N 1°24′31″W | 1210713 | Church of St Andrew More images |
| Church of St Swithin | Church Lane, Combe, Berkshire | Church | 12th century | 6 February 1962 | SU3681360741; 51°20′40″N 1°28′22″W | 1221122 | Church of St Swithin More images |
| Church of St Mary | Church Hill, East Ilsley | Church | 13th century | 24 November 1966 | SU4933080918; 51°31′30″N 1°17′25″W | 1136120 | Church of St Mary More images |
| Parish Church of St Michael, Enborne | Enborne | Church | 12th century | 6 April 1967 | SU4358565773; 51°23′22″N 1°22′30″W | 1220252 | Parish Church of St Michael, Enborne More images |
| Church of St Mark | Englefield | Church | 13th century | 14 April 1967 | SU6238571995; 51°26′37″N 1°06′14″W | 1213321 | Church of St Mark More images |
| Church of All Saints | Farnborough Village, Farnborough | Church | 11th century | 24 November 1966 | SU4351581936; 51°32′05″N 1°22′27″W | 1117199 | Church of All Saints More images |
| St Thomas' Church, East Shefford | East Shefford, Great Shefford | Church | Norman | 11 July 1983 | SU3905874679; 51°28′11″N 1°26′21″W | 1321841 | St Thomas' Church, East Shefford More images |
| Sandleford Priory | Newton Road, Greenham | Country House | c. 1800 | 6 June 1952 | SU4768164440; 51°22′37″N 1°18′59″W | 1220371 | Sandleford Priory More images |
| Pair of Gate Piers 103 Metres South of East End of Church | Park Lane, Hampstead Marshall | Gate Pier | Early C18, before 1718 | 6 March 1985 | SU4203466605; 51°23′49″N 1°23′50″W | 1136047 | Pair of Gate Piers 103 Metres South of East End of Church More images |
| Pair of Gate Piers 204 Metres East of Entrance to Home Farm | Park Lane, Hampstead Marshall | Gate Pier | Early C18, before 1718 | 6 March 1985 | SU4191866685; 51°23′52″N 1°23′56″W | 1136042 | Pair of Gate Piers 204 Metres East of Entrance to Home Farm More images |
| Pair of Gate Piers 210 Metres Due South of Church Tower | Park Lane, Hampstead Marshall | Gate Pier | Late 17th century | 6 March 1985 | SU4198066538; 51°23′47″N 1°23′53″W | 1117219 | Pair of Gate Piers 210 Metres Due South of Church Tower More images |
| Pair of Gate Piers 30 Metres South of East End of Church | Park Lane, Hampstead Marshall | Gate Pier | Early C18, before 1718 | 6 March 1985 | SU4200566711; 51°23′52″N 1°23′51″W | 1117218 | Pair of Gate Piers 30 Metres South of East End of Church More images |
| Three Pairs of Gate Piers and Walls Around Gardens and Terrace at Home Farm | Park Lane, Hampstead Marshall | Gate pier | Late 17th century | 6 March 1985 | SU4188866608; 51°23′49″N 1°23′57″W | 1136034 | Three Pairs of Gate Piers and Walls Around Gardens and Terrace at Home Farm |
| Church of St Mary | Church Street, Hampstead Norreys | Church | 12th century | 24 November 1966 | SU5293276259; 51°28′58″N 1°14′21″W | 1135735 | Church of St Mary More images |
| Church of St Mark and St Luke | Kintbury | Church | 11th century | 6 February 1962 | SU3727667964; 51°24′34″N 1°27′56″W | 1319539 | Church of St Mark and St Luke More images |
| Church of St Michael and All Angels | Market Place, Lambourn | Church | Late Norman | 6 February 1962 | SU3260678957; 51°30′31″N 1°31′54″W | 1113695 | Church of St Michael and All Angels More images |
| West Berkshire Museum | Wharf Street, Newbury | Museum | 1626–7 | 29 September 1950 | SU4724367135; 51°24′05″N 1°19′20″W | 1289770 | West Berkshire Museum More images |
| St Nicolas Church, Newbury | Bartholomew Street, Newbury | Parish Church | 1509–1532 | 29 September 1950 | SU4706167101; 51°24′04″N 1°19′30″W | 1219556 | St Nicolas Church, Newbury More images |
| Church of St John the Baptist | Padworth | Church | c. 1130 | 14 April 1967 | SU6132966158; 51°23′28″N 1°07′12″W | 1155386 | Church of St John the Baptist More images |
| Bere Court and Bere House | Bere Court Road, Pangbourne | House | Circa 13th century | 25 October 1951 | SU6163075016; 51°28′15″N 1°06′51″W | 1213565 | Bere Court and Bere House More images |
| Donnington Castle | Castle Lane, Shaw cum Donnington | Castle | 1386 | 9 September 1969 | SU4611869170; 51°25′11″N 1°20′17″W | 1291031 | Donnington Castle More images |
| Shaw House | Church Road, Shaw cum Donnington | House | 1581 | 6 June 1952 | SU4756168369; 51°24′44″N 1°19′03″W | 1220445 | Shaw House More images |
| Gate Piers and Gates at Benham Park, West Lodge | Bath Road, Speen | Gate | Late 19th century | 6 June 1952 | SU4320968195; 51°24′40″N 1°22′48″W | 1220645 | Gate Piers and Gates at Benham Park, West Lodge More images |
| Church of St Denys | Stanford Dingley | Church | 12th century | 29 November 1983 | SU5755471703; 51°26′29″N 1°10′24″W | 1213251 | Church of St Denys More images |
| Church of St Mary | Sulhamstead | Church | 13th century | 28 January 1987 | SU6450667949; 51°24′25″N 1°04′26″W | 1117112 | Church of St Mary More images |
| Folly Farmhouse and Entrance Court to East | Sulhamstead Hill, Sulhamstead | Country House | c. 1912 | 25 October 1951 | SU6308168917; 51°24′57″N 1°05′39″W | 1135848 | Folly Farmhouse and Entrance Court to East More images |
| Old Bluecoat School | Chapel Street, Thatcham | Chapel | 1304 | 10 November 1983 | SU5217967466; 51°24′14″N 1°15′05″W | 1303195 | Old Bluecoat School More images |
| Church of the Holy Trinity | Church Street, Theale | Church | 1820–1832 | 14 April 1967 | SU6402771290; 51°26′13″N 1°04′49″W | 1288225 | Church of the Holy Trinity More images |
| Church of St Laurence | A340 at Tidmarsh | Church | 12th century | 14 April 1967 | SU6348274552; 51°27′59″N 1°05′15″W | 1287940 | Church of St Laurence More images |
| Ufton Court | Ufton Nervet | House | c. 1568 | 25 October 1951 | SU6258866730; 51°23′46″N 1°06′06″W | 1135879 | Ufton Court More images |
| Church of St Nicholas | Wasing Park, Wasing | Church | 13th century | 6 April 1967 | SU5759964271; 51°22′28″N 1°10′26″W | 1117257 | Church of St Nicholas More images |
| Welford Park and walls to east and west | Welford | Country House | Late 17th century | 6 June 1952 | SU4084273168; 51°27′22″N 1°24′49″W | 1264078 | Welford Park and walls to east and west More images |
| West Woodhay House | West Woodhay | Country House | 1635 | 29 October 1984 | SU3850663253; 51°22′01″N 1°26′54″W | 1290600 | West Woodhay House More images |
| Church of St Peter and St Paul | Yattendon Lane, Yattendon | Church | c. 1450 | 14 April 1967 | SU5541874545; 51°28′02″N 1°12′13″W | 1288822 | Church of St Peter and St Paul More images |

== Windsor and Maidenhead ==
| Name | Location | Type | Completed | Date designated | Grid ref. Geo-coordinates | Entry number | Image |
|---|---|---|---|---|---|---|---|
| Bisham Abbey | Marlow Road, Bisham | Manor house | 1537–1540 | 25 March 1955 | SU8468485021; 51°33′28″N 0°46′47″W | 1303584 | Bisham Abbey More images |
| Dovecote Approximately 68 Metres South West of Bisham Abbey | Marlow Road, Bisham | Dovecote | 15th century | 25 March 1955 | SU8462684965; 51°33′26″N 0°46′51″W | 1319381 | Dovecote Approximately 68 Metres South West of Bisham Abbey More images |
| Marlow Bridge | Marlow Road, Bisham | Suspension bridge | 1831–36 | 11 April 1972 | SU8513286079; 51°34′02″N 0°46′23″W | 1117598 | Marlow Bridge More images |
| Jesus Hospital, including chaplain's house, the almshouses and the chapel | Upper Bray Road, Bray | Almshouse | 1627 | 25 March 1955 | SU9019479367; 51°30′22″N 0°42′07″W | 1319439 | Jesus Hospital, including chaplain's house, the almshouses and the chapel More images |
| Maidenhead Bridge | Crossing River Thames from Maidenhead to Taplow, South Bucks | Road bridge | 1777 | 27 February 1950 | SU9014581356; 51°31′26″N 0°42′07″W | 1117619 | Maidenhead Bridge More images |
| Monkey Island Hotel | Monkey Island Lane, Bray | Fishing Lodge | c. 1738 | 25 March 1955 | SU9144179148; 51°30′14″N 0°41′02″W | 1319431 | Monkey Island Hotel More images |
| The Temple | Island Lane, Bray | Summerhouse | Early 18th century | 25 March 1955 | SU9127679023; 51°30′10″N 0°41′11″W | 1117469 | Upload Photo |
| Ockwells Manor and wall attached on the South East | Ockwells Road, Cox Green | House | 1955 | 25 March 1955 | SU8750378886; 51°30′08″N 0°44′27″W | 1319434 | Ockwells Manor and wall attached on the South East More images |
| Barn at Ockwells Manor | Ockwells Road, Cox Green | Threshing Barn | Late 15th century | 25 March 1955 | SU8756978919; 51°30′09″N 0°44′23″W | 1136298 | Upload Photo |
| Dovecote at Ockwells Manor | Ockwells Road, Cox Green | Dovecote | Late 15th century | 25 March 1955 | SU8755678941; 51°30′09″N 0°44′24″W | 1312870 | Upload Photo |
| Stables and gatehouse at Ockwells Manor | Ockwells Road, Cox Green | Stables and gatehouse | Late 15th century | 25 March 1955 | SU8755478890; 51°30′08″N 0°44′24″W | 1117473 | Upload Photo |
| Eton College | Eton | School | 1441–6 | 11 April 1950 | SU9648678220; 51°29′41″N 0°36′42″W | 1290278 | Eton College More images |
| St Michael's (C of E) | Stanwell Road, Horton | Parish Church (C of E) | 12th century | 23 September 1955 | TQ0147475821; 51°28′20″N 0°32′25″W | 1117644 | St Michael's (C of E) More images |
| Dovecote in the grounds of the Tithe Barn, about nine metres south of the house | High Street, Hurley | Dovecote | Medieval | 25 March 1955 | SU8248384004; 51°32′56″N 0°48′43″W | 1156170 | Dovecote in the grounds of the Tithe Barn, about nine metres south of the house More images |
| Hall Place | Burchetts Green Road, Hurley | House | Late 17th century | 25 March 1955 | SU8334881883; 51°31′47″N 0°48′00″W | 1319394 | Hall Place More images |
| Statue of George III | Windsor Great Park, Windsor | Statue | 1824–1830 | 3 March 1972 | SU9674472706; 51°26′42″N 0°36′34″W | 1323671 | Statue of George III More images |
| Church of St John the Baptist | Shottesbrooke Park, Shottesbrooke | Parish Church | c. 1337 | 11 April 1972 | SU8414677103; 51°29′12″N 0°47′22″W | 1319461 | Church of St John the Baptist More images |
| Church of All Saints | Boyn Hill Road, Maidenhead | Church | 1854–1857 | 24 July 1970 | SU8775680872; 51°31′12″N 0°44′12″W | 1117616 | Church of All Saints More images |
| Frogmore House | The Home Park, Windsor | House | Early 18th century | 2 October 1975 | SU9772075974; 51°28′27″N 0°35′40″W | 1319304 | Frogmore House More images |
| Duchess of Kent's Mausoleum | The Home Park, Windsor | Mausoleum | 1861 | 2 October 1975 | SU9755475915; 51°28′26″N 0°35′48″W | 1117780 | Duchess of Kent's Mausoleum More images |
| The Royal Mausoleum | The Home Park, Windsor | Chest Tomb | 1864–68 | 2 October 1975 | SU9744575940; 51°28′27″N 0°35′54″W | 1117781 | The Royal Mausoleum More images |
| Windsor Guildhall | High Street, Windsor | Town Hall | c. 1686 | 4 January 1950 | SU9682376831; 51°28′56″N 0°36′25″W | 1117752 | Windsor Guildhall More images |
| Windsor Castle including all the buildings within the walls | Windsor | Castle | Stone buildings 1165-1179 | 2 October 1975 | SU9700277033; 51°29′02″N 0°36′16″W | 1117776 | Windsor Castle including all the buildings within the walls More images |

== Wokingham ==
| Name | Location | Type | Completed | Date designated | Grid ref. Geo-coordinates | Entry number | Image |
|---|---|---|---|---|---|---|---|
| Church of St James | Church Lane, Finchampstead | Parish Church | From 12th century | 26 January 1967 | SU7928263810; 51°22′04″N 0°51′45″W | 1118084 | Church of St James More images |
| Henley Bridge | Hart Street, Remenham | Bridge | 18th century | 23 December 1983 | SU7637582642; 51°32′15″N 0°54′01″W | 1117419 | Henley Bridge More images |
| Church of St James | Church Lane, Ruscombe | Parish Church | 12th century | 26 January 1967 | SU7980676295; 51°28′48″N 0°51′08″W | 1154605 | Church of St James More images |
| Church of St Mary the Virgin | Church Lane, Shinfield | Parish Church | Late 12th century | 26 January 1967 | SU7297368198; 51°24′29″N 0°57′08″W | 1118131 | Church of St Mary the Virgin More images |
| The Deanery | Thames Street, Sonning | Courtyard House | 1901 | 1 August 1952 | SU7570575617; 51°28′28″N 0°54′41″W | 1319459 | The Deanery More images |
| Church of St Nicholas | Church Hill, Hurst | Parish Church | Early 13th century | 26 January 1967 | SU7948672972; 51°27′01″N 0°51′27″W | 1117400 | Church of St Nicholas More images |
| Church of All Saints | Church Road, Swallowfield | Church | 19th century | 26 January 1967 | SU7317464788; 51°22′39″N 0°57′00″W | 1118061 | Church of All Saints More images |
| Farley Hall | Farley Hill Road, Swallowfield | Country House | c. 1730 | 1 August 1952 | SU7501464627; 51°22′33″N 0°55′25″W | 1118066 | Farley Hall More images |
| Henry Lucas Hospital and attached water pumps | Chapel Green, Wokingham | Hospital | 1663–1665 | 12 November 1951 | SU8125167394; 51°23′59″N 0°50′00″W | 1303641 | Henry Lucas Hospital and attached water pumps More images |

== See also ==
- Grade II* listed buildings in Berkshire
