= Alice Norreys =

English noblewoman

Lady Alice Norreys (previously Dame Alice Norreys; c. 1405 – c. 1450) was an English Lady of the Most Noble Order of the Garter.

Alice was probably born at Yattendon Castle, her family's Berkshire seat. She was the daughter and heiress of Sir Richard Merbrook of Yattendon. She married Sir John Norreys around 1425 and the couple inherited Yattendon Castle about 1440. As well as Yattendon and Ockwells Manor in Bray, they spent much of their life resident in London where Sir John was Master of the Wardrobe to King Henry VI. They had four children:

- Sir William Norreys (1433-4 January 1507)
- John Norreys, Sheriff of Oxfordshire and Berkshire
- Agnes Norreys, married William Bulstrode of Upton in Buckinghamshire
- Lettice Norreys, married Sir John Harcourt of Stanton Harcourt in Oxfordshire

Alice was created a Lady of the Most Noble Order of the Garter in 1448. She died sometime after 1448 and was probably buried alongside her husband in the Norreys Chapel (of St. Nicholas) in Bray Church in Berkshire.

== See also ==
- List of Ladies of the Garter
- Norreys
