= John Howard, 1st Duke of Norfolk =

English soldier and politician (1425–1485)

His Grace The Duke of Norfolk KG
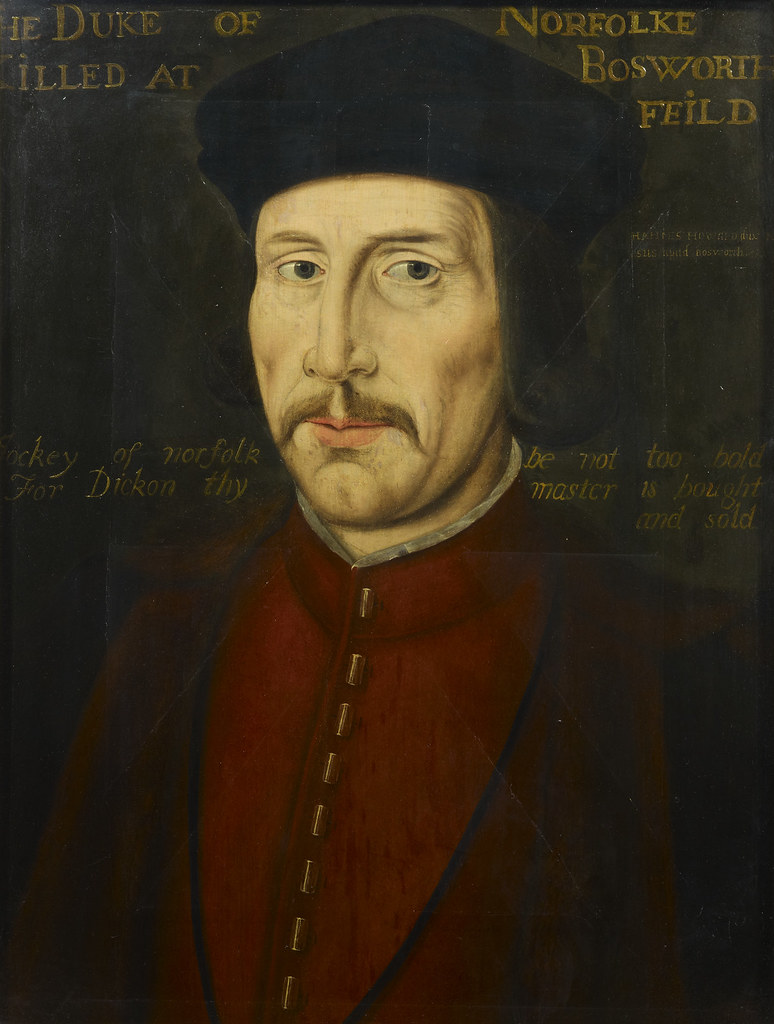

Earl Marshal
- In office 28 June 1483 – 1485
- Preceded by: The Duke of York, and The 2nd Baron Berkeley
- Succeeded by: The 1st Marquess of Berkeley

Member of the House of Lords Lord Temporal
- In office 28 June 1483 – 1485; Hereditary Peerage
- Preceded by: In abeyance
- Succeeded by: The 2nd Duke of Norfolk (1514)

Sheriff of Berkshire and Oxfordshire
- In office 5 November 1467 – 1468
- Preceded by: Sir Richard Harcourt
- Succeeded by: Sir William Norreys

Member of Parliament for Suffolk
- In office 1449–1449

Personal details
- Born: c. 1425
- Died: 22 August 1485
- Spouse(s): Catherine Moleyns; Margaret Chedworth
- Children: Thomas Howard, 2nd Duke of Norfolk; Nicholas Howard; Isabel Howard; Anne Howard; Margaret Howard; Jane Howard; Katherine Howard
- Parents: Sir Robert Howard (father); Margaret Mowbray (mother)

Arms of John Howard, 1st Duke of Norfolk

John Howard, 1st Duke of Norfolk (c. 1425 – 22 August 1485), also known as Jack of Norfolk, was an English nobleman, soldier, politician, and the first Howard Duke of Norfolk. He was a close friend and loyal supporter of King Richard III, with whom he was slain at the Battle of Bosworth in 1485.

== Family ==
John Howard, born about 1425, was the son of Sir Robert Howard (1385–1436) of Tendring Hall, Stoke-by-Nayland, Suffolk by his wife Margaret de Mowbray (1391–1459), eldest daughter of Thomas Mowbray, 1st Duke of Norfolk (of the first creation) (1366–1399), by wife Elizabeth FitzAlan (1366–1425). His paternal grandparents were Sir John Howard of Wiggenhall, Norfolk, and wife Alice Tendring, daughter of Sir William Tendring.

Howard was a descendant of English royalty through both sides of his family. On his father's side, Howard was descended from Richard, 1st Earl of Cornwall, the second son of King John, who had an illegitimate son, named Richard (died 1296), whose daughter, Joan of Cornwall, married Sir John Howard (d. shortly before 23 July 1331). On his mother's side, Howard was descended from Thomas of Brotherton, 1st Earl of Norfolk, the elder son of Edward I of England by his second wife, Margaret of France, and from Edward I's younger brother, Edmund Crouchback.

== Career ==
Howard succeeded his father in 1436 and then his grandfather in 1437. In his youth, he was in the household of his cousin John Mowbray, Duke of Norfolk (died 1461), and was drawn into Norfolk's conflicts with William de la Pole, Duke of Suffolk. In 1453 he was involved in a lawsuit with Suffolk's wife, Alice Chaucer. He had been elected to Parliament in 1449 as Shire knight for Suffolk and during the 1450s he held several local offices. According to Crawford, he was at one point during this period described as "wode as a wilde bullok". He is said to have been with Lord Lisle in his expedition to Guyenne in 1452, which ended in defeat at Castillon on 17 July 1453. He received an official commission from the King on 10 December 1455 and also had been utilised by Henry to promote friendship between Lord Moleyns (his father-in-law) and one John Clopton.

He was a staunch adherent of the House of York during the Wars of the Roses, and was knighted by King Edward IV at the Battle of Towton on 29 March 1461. (Note: Crawford (2004) states that he was knighted at Edward IV's coronation.) In the same year he was appointed Constable of Norwich and Colchester castles, and became part of the royal household as one of the King's carvers, "the start of a service to the house of York which was to last for the rest of his life."

In 1461 Howard was High Sheriff of Norfolk and Suffolk, and during the years 1462–4, he took part in military campaigns against the Lancastrians. In 1467 he served as deputy for Norfolk as Earl Marshal at 'the most splendid tournament of the age' when Antoine, count of La Roche, the Bastard of Burgundy, jousted against the Queen's brother, Lord Scales.

In the same year he was one of three ambassadors sent to Burgundy to arrange the marriage of the King's sister, Margaret of York, to Charles, Duke of Burgundy. At about this time he was made a member of the King's council, and in 1468 he was among those who escorted Margaret to Burgundy for her wedding.

During the 1460s Howard had become involved in the internal politics of St John's Abbey in Colchester, of which he was a patron. He interfered with the abbatial elections at the Abbey following the death of Abbot Ardeley in 1464, helping the Yorkist supporter John Canon to win the election. Howard then appears to have interfered again in support of Abbot Stansted's election following Canon's death in 1464.

Howard's advancement in the King's household continued. By 1467 he was a Knight of the Body, and in September 1468 was appointed Treasurer of the Royal Household, an office which he held for only two years, until Edward lost the throne in 1470.

According to Crawford, Howard was a wealthy man by 1470, and when Edward IV's first reign ended he went into exile on the continent. In the area around Stoke-by-Nayland Howard held some sixteen manors, seven of which the King had granted him in 1462. After 1463, he purchased a number of other manors, including six forfeited by John de Vere, 12th Earl of Oxford, the son of his cousin, Elizabeth Howard.

Howard was summoned to Parliament from 15 October 1470 by writs directed to Iohanni Howard de Howard Militi and Iohanni Howard Chivaler, whereby he is held to have become Lord Howard. On 24 April 1472, he was admitted to the Order of the Garter. In 1475 he accompanied Edward in his attempt on France. In 1482 he spent time in Harwich, Essex building up the navy, and made a donation to the Dovercourt shrine.

In April 1483 he bore the royal banner at the funeral of King Edward IV. He supported Richard III's accession to the throne, and at his behest took the nine year old Richard of Shrewsbury, the younger son of Edward IV, from Westminster Abbey where he was seeking sanctuary with his mother to the Tower of London to join his brother Edward V, both of whom subsequently disappeared in mysterious circumstances. He was appointed Lord High Steward and bore the crown before Richard at his coronation, while his eldest son, the Earl of Surrey, carried the Sword of State.

On 28 June 1483 he was created Duke of Norfolk, third creation. The first creation had become extinct on the death of Anne de Mowbray, 8th Countess of Norfolk. She died as a child in 1476, the only heir of John de Mowbray, 4th Duke of Norfolk. The second creation was removed illegally from her widower, Richard of York, on 25 June 1483. This left John Howard as heir to the duchy, and his alliance with Richard ensured his acquisition of the title. He was also created Earl Marshal, and Lord High Admiral of all England, Ireland, and Aquitaine.

The Duke's principal home was at Stoke-by-Nayland (and later Framlingham Castle) in Suffolk. However, after his second marriage he frequently resided at Ockwells Manor at Cox Green in Bray as it was conveniently close to the royal residence at Windsor Castle.

== Marriages and issue ==
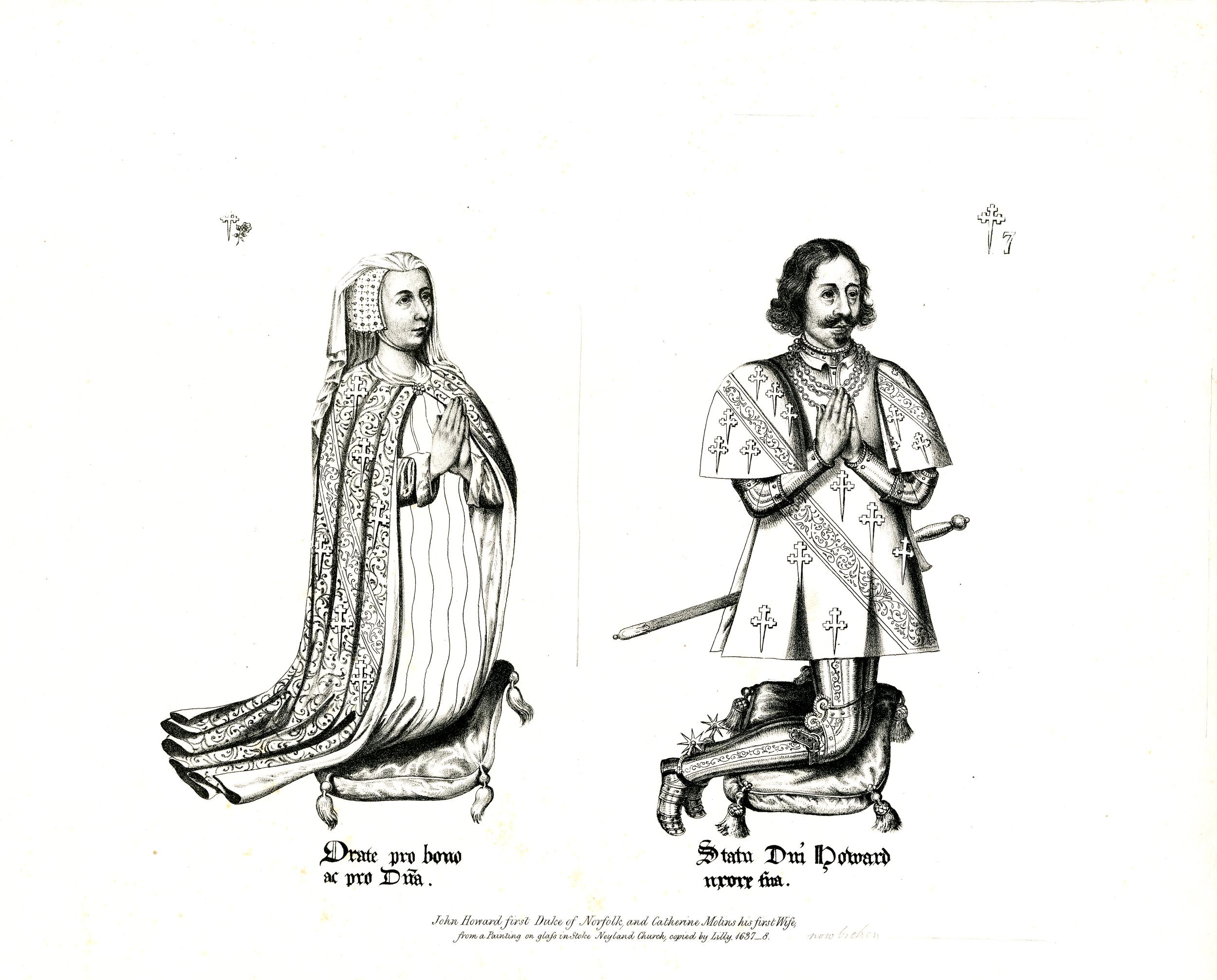
Sketch of stained glass depictions of John Howard first Duke of Norfolk, and Catherine Moleyns his first wife.

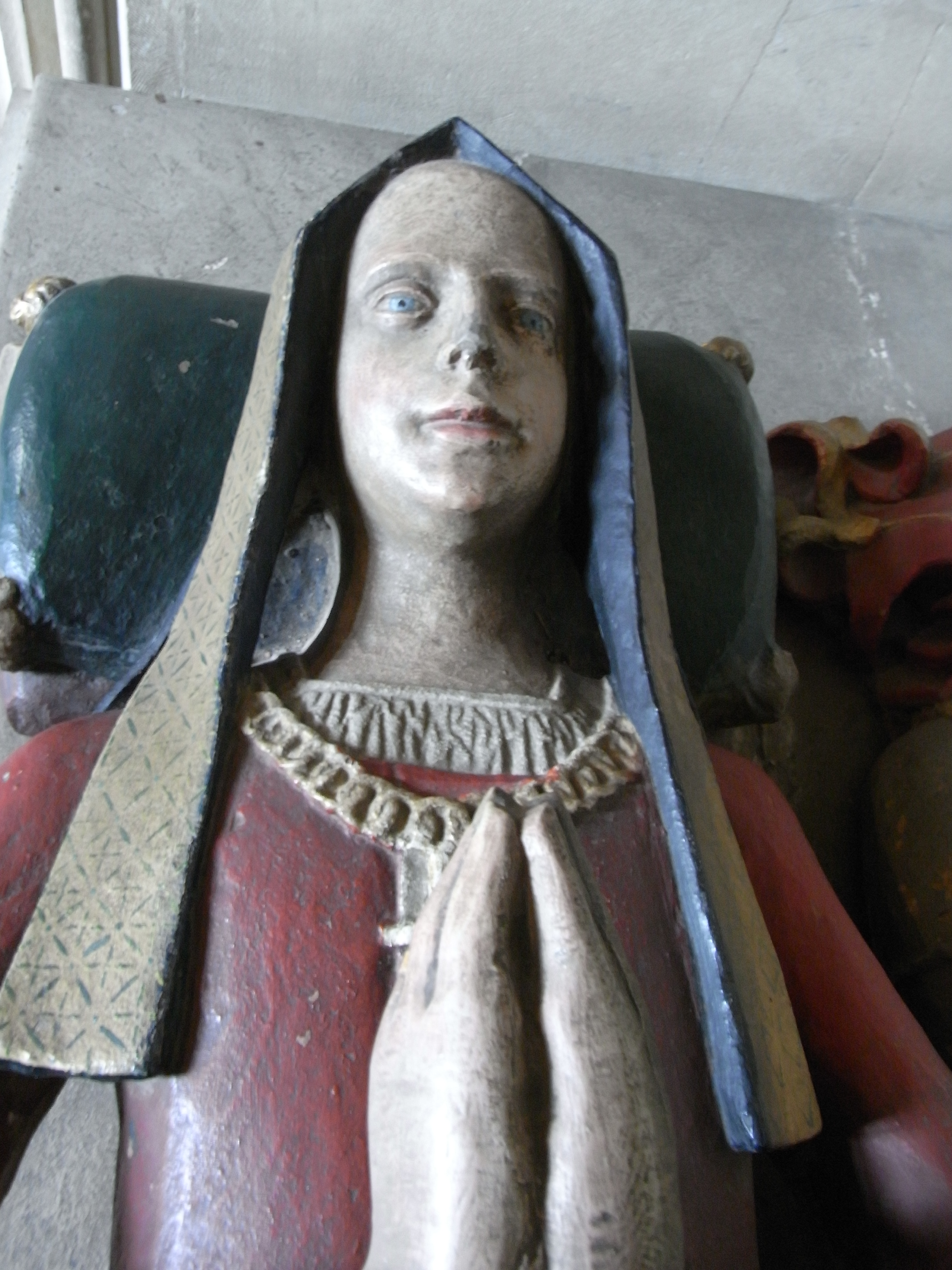
Effigy of Lady Anne Gorges, Gorges tomb, Wraxall Church

Before 29 September 1442, he married Catherine (died 3 November 1465), the daughter of Sir William Moleyns (7 January 1378 – 8 June 1425), of Stoke Poges in Buckinghamshire, and his wife Margery (died 26 March 1439).

With Catherine Moleyns, he had two sons and four daughters:

- Thomas Howard, 2nd Duke of Norfolk, Earl of Surrey (1443 – 21 May 1524), who married firstly, on 30 April 1472, as her second husband, Elizabeth Tilney, by whom he had ten children including Thomas Howard, 3rd Duke of Norfolk, and Elizabeth Howard, wife of Sir Thomas Boleyn, 1st Earl of Wiltshire; he married secondly, in 1497, Agnes Tilney, by whom he had eleven children.
- Nicholas Howard (died c. 1468).
- Isabel or Elizabeth Howard, who married Robert Mortimer (died 1485), esquire, of Landmere in Thorpe-le-Soken, slain at Bosworth, by whom she had a daughter, Elizabeth, who married George Guildford, younger son of Sir Richard Guildford.
- Anne Howard (1446–1474), who married Sir Edmund Gorges (1442–1512) of Wraxall, by whom she had issue including Sir Edward Gorges (1482–1565), knighted at Flodden (1513) by his uncle, Thomas Howard, 2nd Duke of Norfolk.
- Jane Howard (1450 – 15 August 1508), who in 1481 married Sir John Timperley of Hintlesham, Suffolk, without issue.
- Margaret Howard (1445–1484/1524), who married Sir John Wyndham of Crownthorpe and Felbrigg, Norfolk (1443–1503), by whom she had issue (see Wyndham).

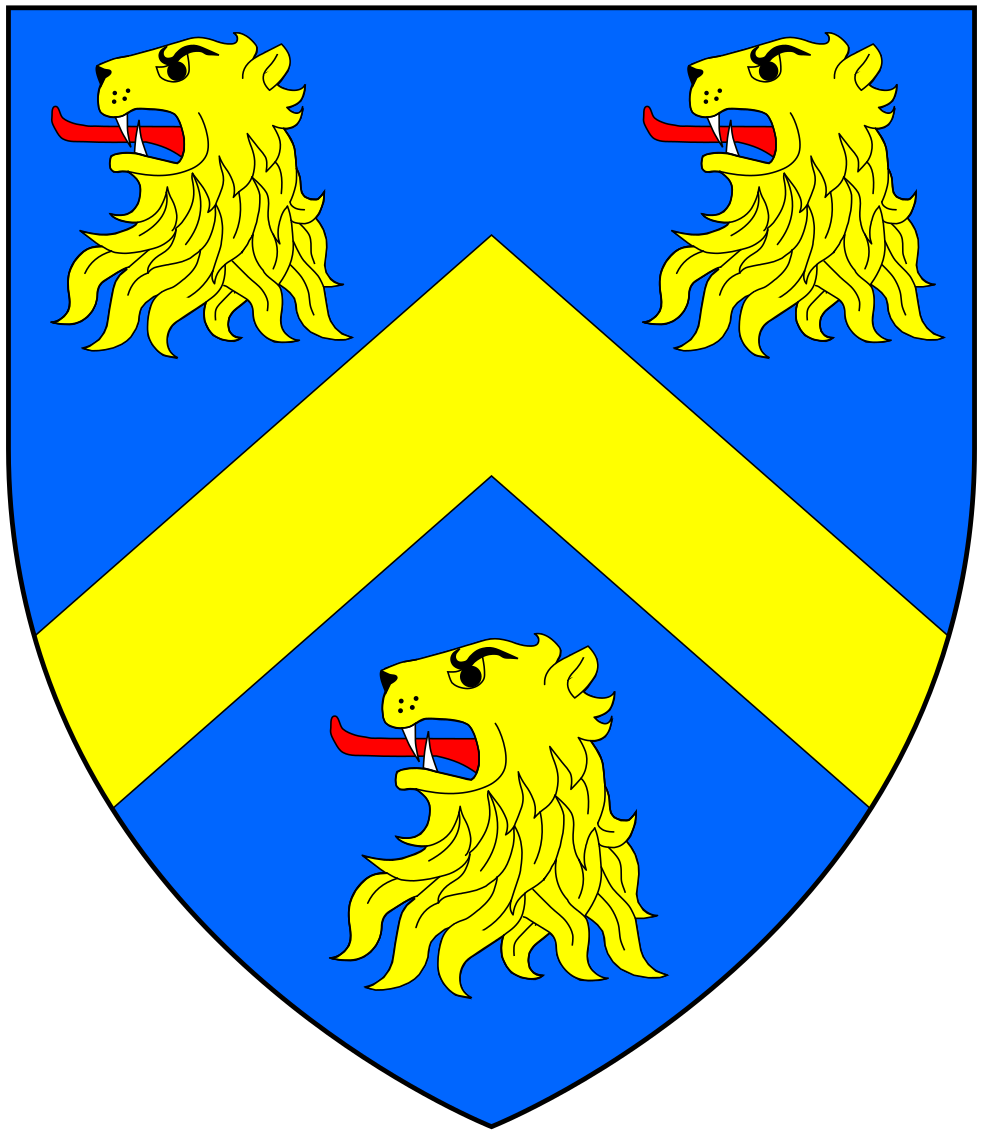
Arms of Wyndham: Azure, a chevron between three lion's heads erased or

Howard married secondly, before 22 January 1467, Margaret (1436–1494), the daughter of Sir John Chedworth and his wife, Margaret Bowett, (Note: In some sources Margaret Bowett's maiden name is said to have been Wyfold, but this is an error; it was her daughter, Margaret Chedworth, who married Nicholas Wyfold in 1455. Margaret Bowett's parents were Nicholas Bowett of Rippingale, Lincolnshire, and Elizabeth La Zouche of Harringworth, Northamptonshire.) and widow, firstly of Nicholas Wyfold (1420–1456), Lord Mayor of London, and secondly of Sir John Norreys (1400 – 1 September 1466), Master of the Wardrobe.

By his second wife, Margaret Chedworth, he had one daughter:

- Katherine Howard (died 17 March 1536), who married John Bourchier, 2nd Baron Berners, by whom she had issue.

== Death ==
As part of his duties as Earl Marshal, John Howard ordered the muster of lords, knights and common soldiers to the abbey at Bury St Edmunds to join Richard III to march on Redemoor Plain, better known as Bosworth Field. He was slain at the Battle of Bosworth Field on 22 August 1485 by the knight Sir John Savage in single combat, according to the Ballad of Lady Bessy. Howard was the commander of the vanguard, and his son, the Earl of Surrey, his lieutenant. Howard's death had a demoralising effect on his friend and patron King Richard, who was slain later in the battle. There is an alternative telling of events which states that Howard was killed when a Lancastrian arrow struck him in the face after the face guard had been torn off his helmet during an earlier altercation with the Earl of Oxford. Shakespeare relates how, the night before, someone had left John Howard a note attached to his tent warning him that King Richard, his "master", was going to be double-crossed (which he was):

"Jack of Norfolk, be not too bold, For Dickon, thy master, is bought and sold."

However, this story does not appear earlier than Edward Hall in 1548, so it may well be an apocryphal embellishment of a later era.

He was buried in Thetford Priory, but his body seems to have been moved at the Reformation, possibly to the tomb of the 3rd Duke of Norfolk at Framlingham Church. The monumental brass of his first wife Katherine Moleyns can, however, still be seen in Suffolk.

Howard was the great-grandfather of Anne Boleyn and Catherine Howard, the second and fifth Queens consort, respectively, of King Henry VIII. Thus, through Anne Boleyn, he was the great-great-grandfather of Elizabeth I. After his death, his titles were declared forfeit by King Henry VII, but his son, the 1st Earl of Surrey, was later restored as 2nd Duke (the Barony of Howard, however, remains forfeit). His senior descendants, the Dukes of Norfolk, have been Earls Marshal and Premier Peers of England since the 17th century, and male-line descendants hold the Earldoms of Carlisle, Suffolk, Berkshire and Effingham.

== Footnotes ==
Political offices
Preceded by Sir Richard Harcourt	High Sheriff of Berkshire and Oxfordshire; 1467–1468	Succeeded by Sir William Norreys
Preceded by The Duke of Gloucester	Lord High Admiral; 1483–1485	Succeeded by The Earl of Oxford
Preceded by The Duke of York	Earl Marshal; 1483–1485	Succeeded by The Earl of Nottingham
Peerage of England
New creation	Duke of Norfolk; 1483–1485	Vacant Forfeit & attainted Title next held by Thomas Howard
In abeyance Title last held by Anne de Mowbray	Baron Mowbray; Baron Segrave c 1484–1485	Vacant Forfeit & attainted Title next held by Thomas Howard
