= John Norreys (Usher of the Chamber) =

Sir John Norreys or Norris (c. 1481 – 21 October 1564) was a gentleman usher daily waiter at the English court during the reign of the House of Tudor. He is thought to be the author of a treatise describing the roles of servants of the chamber.

== Family ==
Probably born at Yattendon Castle in Berkshire, John was the eldest son of Sir Edward Norreys (d. 1487) and Lady Frideswide Lovell, sister and heiress of Lord Lovell. He was named after his great-grandfather Sir John Norreys, who had established this branch of the Norreys family as extensive landowners in the county of Berkshire. The Norreys family members often held positions of importance at the English court.

John's father Edward, the eldest son and heir of Sir William Norreys, had taken part in the Battle of Stoke Field in 1487, dying shortly afterwards. John was then his grandfather's heir, and succeeded to the Norreys family estates upon the old man's death in 1507. The estates included major residences such as Yattendon Castle and Ockwells and minor lands like Norreys Manor in Wokingham.

== Murderer ==
In 1517, John murdered one John Enhold of Nettlebed in unknown circumstances. He was fined 1,000 marks and had to surrender Ockwells in return for a pardon obtained on his behalf by his brother Henry. His uncle, Sir Thomas Fettiplace, took possession of Ockwells.

== Marriage ==
John married Elizabeth Braye (born c. 1490), daughter of John Braye of Eaton Bray, whose family was as important in England as the Norreys family. Elizabeth's brother, Edmund Braye (d. 1539), was the 1st Baron Braye, a title created for him in 1529. Her brother, Edward Braye (d. 1558), was a Member of Parliament. The couple was childless.

== Gentleman usher daily waiter ==
John Norris rose in favour at Court, perhaps with the help of his mother, and became the Esquire of the body of King Henry VII, and later the usher of the outer chamber to both King Henry VIII and King Edward VI.

On 17 August 1520, John entertained King Henry VIII and his Queen Catherine of Aragon at Yattendon Castle. As a New Year's Day gift in 1539, Norris gave Henry a dozen fine handkerchiefs. Henry VIII appointed him keeper of Ashridge Park, and woodward and warrener in the Lordships of Cookham and Bray.

At the coronation of Edward VI, Norreys and another usher, William Ransford, wore robes in the procession to represent the Duchy of Gascony and Guyenne. Their presence represented the English claim to these territories. During the service in Westminster Abbey the four ushers carried Edward in a portable chair.

Described as "a rank papist" by Edward Underhill, he was promoted to be chief usher of the privy chamber to Queen Mary Tudor. He served at her coronation at Westminster Abbey and at her wedding at Winchester Cathedral. As chief usher, he was asked to build the dais and stages and decorate the cathedral with hangings and tapestry.

On the accession of Queen Elizabeth, Norreys was summoned to Hatfield House. He then retired from court to Ashampstead.

Norreys seems to be the author of a manuscript treatise on ceremonial for fellow Gentleman Ushers produced at this time. The work includes a description of the coronation of Anne Boleyn, and a diagram of the stage at the wedding of Mary I at Winchester. The treatise refers to the care and use of textiles at court. The manuscript was formerly attributed to Henry Norris.

== Nephews and nieces ==
When John's younger brother, Sir Henry Norreys, was beheaded in 1536 for his supposed adultery with the queen, Anne Boleyn, John and his wife, Elizabeth, took over the care of Henry's orphaned children Henry and Mary. Having no legitimate children of his own, John was licensed to settle his estates in reversion on his nephew in December 1542.
