= Norreys Estate =

Estate in Wokingham, Berkshire, England

Coordinates: 51.419°N 0.825°W

The Norreys Estate is a housing estate, part of the Dowlesgreen area of Wokingham in the English county of Berkshire, situated just east of the town centre.

Before 1844, the area was officially a detached part of Wiltshire. The estate is named after the Norreys family from Ockwells Manor in Cox Green, Berkshire and Yattendon Castle. One of their minor manors covered this area and was known as Norreys Manor. More specifically the name was taken from the large Norreys Avenue, which now runs through the southern portion of the estate. This road was built on arable farmland in the late 1940s as emergency housing during World War II.

The area contains many houses, mostly built in the 1960s, including much of Ashridge Road, Budges Road, Eustace Crescent, Barrett Crescent and Longs Way. After London Road and Finchampstead Road, Norreys Avenue is one of the largest residential roads in Wokingham. It starts off at a junction off Wiltshire Road, heads slightly NNE before turning sharply north, then east, the curving around back to a southern direction, forming the distinctive "n" shape. A few cul-de-sacs appear on the road, including Coronation Square, Elizabeth Road.

In 2011, the Council proposed to demolish the 1960s blocks of flats on Eustace Crescent and replace them with more modern, low-rise accommodation, due to the deteriorating quality of the buildings. As of 2014, most tenants have been moved out of the buildings, and demolition is expected to follow shortly.
