= Christopher Batt =

Christopher Batt may refer to:

- Chris Batt (born 1956), Australian politician
- Christopher Batt (cricketer) (born 1976), English cricketer
