= Norreys =

Norreys (also spelt Norris) may refer to various members of, or estates belonging to, a landed family chiefly seated in the English counties of Berkshire and Lancashire and the Irish county of Cork.

== Famous family members ==
- Baron Norreys of Rycote
- Earl of Abingdon whose secondary title is Baron Norreys of Rycote
- Sir John Norreys (Esquire), Keeper of the Wardrobe for King Henry VI of England
- Alice Norreys, 15th century Lady of the Garter
- Sir William Norreys, 15th century Lancastrian soldier
- Sir John Norreys (usher), 16th century courtier and usher to members of the House of Tudor
- Sir Henry Norreys, 16th century courtier accused of adultery with Queen Anne Boleyn
- Henry Norris, 1st Baron Norreys, 16th century ambassador to France
- Sir John Norreys, 16th century English soldier
- Sir Edward Norreys, 16th century Governor of Ostend and English Member of Parliament
- Sir William Norris, 1st Baronet of Speke, Member of Parliament for Liverpool and Ambassador to the Mughal Emperor

== See also ==
- Hampstead Norreys in Berkshire
- Norreys Estate at Wokingham in Berkshire
- Yattendon Castle in Berkshire
- Ockwells Manor in Berkshire
- Jephson family
- Mallow Castle in Cork, Ireland
- Norris (surname)
