= John Norreys (Keeper of the Wardrobe) =

Sir John Norreys (c. 1400 – 1 September 1466) was a high ranking Lancastrian, and the head of the branch of the Norreys family who became prominent under the reign of the House of Tudor. He served as Keeper of the Wardrobe for King Henry VI of England.

== Family ==
John was the son of William Norreys (born c. 1375) Esquire of Ockwells Manor and Christina Stretch, daughter and heiress of William Stretch of Ruscombe. William Norreys was the son and heir of Roger Norreys of Bray. The Norreys family were descendants of the prominent le Norreys family, who are said to have come to England soon after the Norman Invasion.

== Marriages and children ==
John Norreys married (1st) before 1437 Alice (c. 1405 – c. 1450), daughter and heiress of Richard Merbrook (or Merbroke), Esq., of Yattendon, Berkshire. His wife, Alice, was made a Lady of the Most Noble Order of the Garter in 1448 [see Beltz, Memorials of the Order of the Garter (1841): ccxxiv]. The couple had two sons:

- Sir William Norreys (1433 – 4 January 1507)
- John Norreys, living 1466.

After Alice's death, John Norreys married (2nd) Eleanor Clitherow, daughter and co-heiress of Roger Clitherow, of Goldston [in Ash], Kent, by his wife, Maud. She was living 1455. The couple had one son and one daughter.

- John Norreys, Esq. (of Goldston [in Ash], Kent), married Isabel/Elizabeth Wyfold, daughter and heiress of Nicholas Wyfold, Alderman, Citizen, and grocer of London, Mayor of London (1450–1).
- Anne Norreys, living 1495, married (1st) John Harcourt, Esq. (born c. 1450, died 1485), of Stanton Harcourt, Oxfordshire; (2nd) before 1495 John Grey, Esq., of Bosworth, Leicestershire.

John Norreys married (3rd) in September 1459 Margaret Chedworth (1436–1494), widow of Nicholas Wyfold (died 1456), Alderman, Citizen, and grocer of London, Mayor of London (1450–1), and daughter of John Chedworth, Knt., civil lawyer, by his wife, Joan. The couple had one son and one daughter:

- William Norreys, living 1466.
- Lettice Norreys, living 1466.

His widow, Margaret Chedworth, married (3rd) before 22 Jan. 1467 John Howard, 1st Duke of Norfolk.

== Property ==
John began rebuilding the family home of Ockwells in 1446. The windows of its great hall still contain the fine stained glass he placed there, showing the arms of his friends, including the King and Queen, the Bishop of Salisbury and the Dukes of Warwick, Somerset and Suffolk.

Through his first marriage, to Alice, John gained ownership of Yattendon Castle around 1440, then just a manor house. He received a Royal licence to crenellate Yattendon Castle on 20 January 1448 and to empark some 600 acres (2.4 km^{2}). In 1450 he purchased the manor of Hampstead Ferrers, which soon became renamed Hampstead Norreys. He then began buying many neighbouring estates, consolidating his extensive landholding in the county of Berkshire.

== Royal association ==
John made a life for himself at the royal court. He was a Knight of the Shire (MP) for Berkshire and Sheriff of Oxfordshire and Berkshire in 1442 and 1457. He was made a Yeoman of the King's Chamber by 1439, usher of the Chamber and then Esquire of the Body in 1441. From 1444 to 1446 he was Keeper of the wardrobe to King Henry VI and in 1447 was appointed, until 1452, Treasurer of the Chamber and master of the Queen's jewels.

He was later made a Knight of the Bath.

== Later life ==
Sir John died on 1 September 1466. He was buried in the Norreys Chapel (of St. Nicholas) in Bray Church, in a marble tomb. His tomb has not survived, but the Norreys arms, which are carved in stone and located on the walls, still exist.

== Descendants ==
John's descendants all served at court. His great grandson Sir John Norreys served as Esquire of the body of King Henry VII, and later usher to King Henry VIII, King Edward VI, and Queen Mary I.

Another of his great grandsons, Sir Henry Norreys served under King Henry VIII and was beheaded for his supposed adultery with Queen Anne Boleyn.

Great-great-grandson Sir Henry Norris was a lifelong friend of Queen Elizabeth I, serving as Ambassador to France, and eventually was made 1st Baron Norreys. Henry Norris' 6 sons all served with distinction in the military under Queen Elizabeth. One, Sir John Norreys, was considered the most acclaimed soldier of his time.

Political offices
Preceded by Richard Quartermain	High Sheriff of Berkshire and Oxfordshire; 1437–1438	Succeeded by Edward Reade
Preceded by Peter Fettiplace	High Sheriff of Berkshire and Oxfordshire; 1442–1443	Succeeded by Sir John Chalers
Preceded by Walter Mantell	High Sheriff of Berkshire and Oxfordshire; 1457–1458	Succeeded by William Brocas
