= Great Thrift Wood =

Site of Special Scientific Interest

- Site of Special Scientific Interest
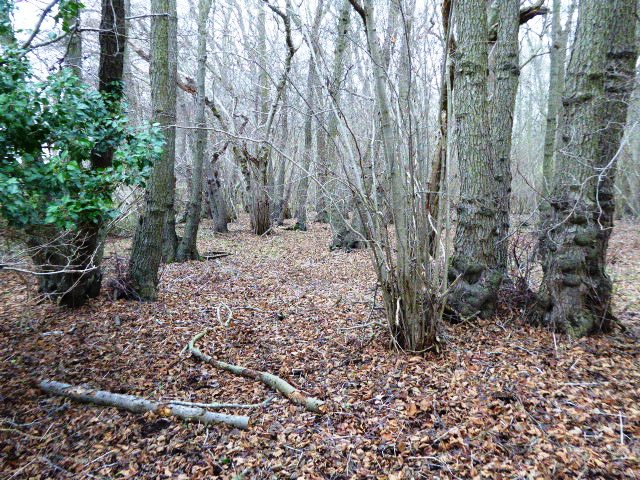

- Location within Berkshire
- Location of Great Thrift Wood.
- Area of search: Berkshire
- Grid reference: SU 871 782
- Coordinates: 51.495°N 0.747°W
- Interest: Biological
- Area: 14.2 hectares (35 acres)
- Notification date: 1984
- Location map: Magic Map

Great Thrift Wood is a 14.2-hectare (35-acre) biological Site of Special Scientific Interest in Cox Green in Berkshire. The site is a broadleaved, mixed and yew woodland located in a lowland area. The wood was classed in 1984 as a Site of Special Scientific Interest.

== Flora ==
The site has the following Flora:

=== Trees ===
- Birch
- Fraxinus
- Salix cinerea
- Quercus robur
- Hazel
- Alder
- Salix fragilis
- Frangula alnus
- Acer campestre
- Populus tremula
- Sorbus torminalis

=== Plants ===
- Rubus fruticosus
- Circaea lutetiana
- Anemone nemorosa
- Orchis mascula
- Lysimachia nemorum
- Ranunculus auricomus
- Carex acutiformis
- Iris pseudacorus
- Valeriana officinalis
- Lychnis flos-cuculi
- Mentha aquatica
- Festuca gigantea
- Agropyron caninum
