= Ockwells Park =

Park in Cox Green, Berkshire, England

Coordinates: 51.499°N 0.734°W

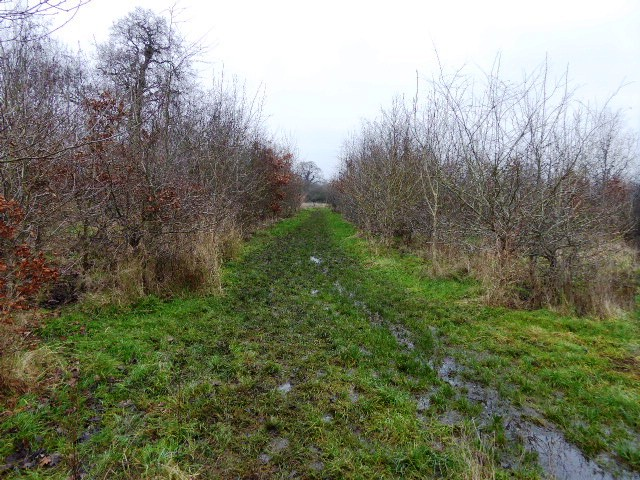

Ockwells Park is a park, part of which is a local nature reserve, in Cox Green, Berkshire, England. The nature reserve is owned by the Royal Borough of Windsor and Maidenhead.

== Geography and site ==
The park is 130 acres (53 ha) in size. The nature reserve within the park is 9.3 hectares (23 acres). The park features sports pitches, a café and the nature reserve, which includes woodland, meadow, copses and a stream.

== History ==
The park was originally part of the estate belonging to Ockwells Manor Estate. The Park was opened to the public during the 1980s. In 1999 part of the site was declared as a local nature reserve by the Royal Borough of Windsor and Maidenhead.

In December 2012 and completed in February 2013, 1000 trees were planted to form an area called Jubilee Wood, when the council decided to participate in the Woodland Trust's Jubilee Wood Project.

In the summer of 2016, the local council purchased land from the adjacent Thrift Wood Farm to extend the park by 86 acres (35 ha) to add to the original 44 acres (18 ha). The site was open to the public in April 2017 after having been cleared of equipment from the previous owners and a bridge to the existing park site being built.

== Flora ==
The site has the following flora:

=== Trees ===
- Populus tremula
- Malus sylvestris
- Acer campestre
- Crataegus monogyna
- Carpinus betulus
- Tilia × europaea
- Quercus robur

=== Plants ===
- Rosa canina
