= Christopher Batt (cricketer) =

English cricketer (born 1976)

Personal information
- Full name: Christopher James Batt
- Born: 22 September 1976 (age 50); Taplow, Buckinghamshire, England
- Nickname: Nora, Batsman, Batty, Closet
- Batting: Left-handed
- Bowling: Left-arm medium-fast

Domestic team information
- Years: Team
- 2005: Buckinghamshire
- 2001: Berkshire
- 1998–2000: Middlesex
- 1997: Sussex
- 1997–1998: Berkshire

Career statistics
Competition	FC	LA
Matches	12	9
Runs scored	177	19
Batting average	11.80	9.50
100s/50s	–/–	–/–
Top score	43	8*
Balls bowled	1,697	384
Wickets	37	14
Bowling average	29.51	19.00
5 wickets in innings	2	–
10 wickets in match	–	–
Best bowling	6/101	3/26
Catches/stumpings	3/–	1/–
- Source: Cricinfo, 26 September 2010

Christopher James Batt (born 22 September 1976) is a former English cricketer. Batt was a left-handed batsman who bowled left-arm medium-fast. He was born at Taplow, Buckinghamshire and educated at Cox Green School in Maidenhead, Berkshire.

Batt played a single Minor Counties Championship match for Berkshire in 1997 against Herefordshire. He also made his debut in the MCCA Knockout Trophy for the county by playing a single match against Buckinghamshire. During that same season he played a single first-class match for Sussex against Oxford University. This was his only representative match for Sussex.

In 1998, he joined Middlesex, where he made his first-class debut for the county against Oxford University. From 1998 to 2000, he represented the county 11 first-class matches, the last of which came against Nottinghamshire in the 2000 County Championship. In his 12 first-class matches, he scored 177 runs at a batting average of 11.80, with a high score of 43. With the ball he took 37 wickets at a bowling average of 29.51, with 2 five wicket hauls and best figures of 6/101. His best figures were achieved on debut while opening the attack with Angus Fraser. Batt also made his debut in List-A cricket for Middlesex, playing his first List-A match against Yorkshire in 1998. Between 1998 and 2000 he represented the county in 7 List-A matches, the last of which came against Derbyshire. Unable to sustain his consistency, he was released by Middlesex at the end of the 2000 season.

For 2001 he rejoined Berkshire, where he played just a single Minor Counties Championship match for the county against Shropshire. Batt played 4 further MCCA Knockout Trophy matches for the county in the 2001 season, culminating in his final match Trophy match against the Hampshire Cricket Board. During the 2001 season, he also represented Berkshire in 2 List-A matches against the Middlesex Cricket Board and Essex. In his combined List-A career, he took 14 wickets at an average of 19.00, with best figures of 3/26.

In 2005, he joined Buckinghamshire, where he made his debut for the county in the Minor Counties Championship against Cambridgeshire. During the 2005 season, he represented the county in 4 Championship matches, the last of which came against Norfolk.
