= William Norreys =

Esquire of the Body to King Edward IV

Sir William Norreys (c. 1441 – before 10 January 1507) was a famous Lancastrian soldier, and later an Esquire of the Body to King Edward IV.

Probably born at Yattendon Castle, William was the eldest son of Sir John Norreys of Ockwells and Yattendon and Lady Alice Merbrook, Lady of the Garter. Upon the death of his father, he inherited all of the family's properties, including Yattendon Castle, but excluding Ockwells, which he inherited in 1494 upon the death of his stepmother.

== Wars of the Roses ==
William was a Lancastrian soldier in the Royal Army during the Wars of the Roses. He was knighted by King Henry VI at the Battle of Northampton, on 10 July 1460, when he was 20 years old. He was present at the Battle of Towton, on 29 March 1461, the largest and bloodiest battle of the wars. Though he survived the battle, when so few Lancastrians did, he was forced to make peace with the recently proclaimed King Edward IV.

== New monarchy ==
Like his father, William adjusted to the new monarchy. By August 1461, he was appointed Steward of both the Royal manors of Cookham and Bray, adjoining his family estate of Ockwells. He was later appointed steward of nearby Foliejon Manor in Winkfield, in 1474.

He was appointed Sheriff of Oxfordshire and Berkshire in 1468, positions he also held in 1482 and 1486. In 1467, he became Justice of the Peace for Berkshire. In 1469, Sir William was made Esquire of the Body to King Edward IV.

During the rebellion of 1470, begun by Warwick, the 'Kingmaker', which briefly re-instated Henry VI as king, William may have fought on King Edward's side for he retained his position at court.

He participated in the Battle of Barnet on 14 April 1471.

== Rebellion and exile ==
In 1483, shortly after the July crowning of King Richard III, William reverted to his anti-Yorkist sympathies. In October 1483, he joined his younger brother, John, in the Duke of Buckingham's rebellion.

The Duke assembled his forces at Brecon, while Sir William, accompanied by Sir William Berkeley of Beaverstone and Sir Richard Woodville, gathered rebels at Newbury. Buckingham was, however, captured and executed. William fled West when a reward was offered for his capture. He was eventually rounded up in Devon and arrested, but escaped to Brittany. There he joined the forces of the Lancastrian Earl of Richmond.

== Return ==
He returned to England, with the Earl of Richmond, and commanded a troop at the Battle of Bosworth, on 22 August 1485, when King Richard III was killed and Richmond claimed the Throne as King Henry VII. William was richly rewarded for his loyalty.

On 16 June 1487, he commanded the Royal Forces, including his son, Sir Edward Norreys, at the Battle of Stoke Field against Lambert Simnel. His son died shortly afterwards.

He was Bailiff for Queen Elizabeth in 1488. He was reinstated as Justice of the Peace for Berkshire in 1494. He gave legal advice to the King in 1502, which brought him the appointment as custodian of the manor of Langley, and Steward of the manors of Burford, Shipton, Spelsbury and the Hundred of Chadlington (all in Oxfordshire). In 1504, he added the stewardships of Newbury and Stratfield Mortimer to his offices. He became Steward to the Chancellor of Oxford University in 1505.

== Marriages and issue ==
In 1461 Norreys married Jane de Vere (d. before 1471), sister of 13th Earl of Oxford, by whom he had four sons and two daughters:

- Sir Edward Norreys (c. 1464 – 1487).
- Richard Norreys (c. 1465 – c. 1522) of West Shefford, Berkshire.
- William Norreys.
- George Norreys.
- Margaret Norreys, who married Gilbert Bullock, esquire, of Arborfield and Barkham, Berkshire.
- Elizabeth Norreys (d. 22 January 1518), who married firstly Thomas Rogers, and secondly Thomas Fettiplace of Compton Beauchamp in Berkshire (c. 1461–1523).

On 25 April 1472, Norreys married Isabel Ingoldesthorpe, Marchioness of Montagu (1441 Cambridgeshire – 25 May 1476 buried: Bisham), daughter and co-heiress of Sir Edmund Ingoldesthorpe (1421–1456) and Joanna Tiptopf (1425–1494), and the widow of the 1st Marquess of Montagu, by whom she had two sons and five daughters.

By his second wife Norreys had one son, who died an infant. Isabel Ingoldesthorpe died 20 May 1476, and was buried with her first husband at Bisham Priory.

Norreys married thirdly, about 1478, Anne Horne, widow of Sir William Harcourt and Sir John Stanley (d. 29 June 1476), and daughter of Robert Horne, Alderman of London, by Joan, daughter of Edward Fabian. They had two sons and four daughters:

- Richard Norreys.
- Lionel Norreys (c. 1480–1537).
- Katherine Norreys (born c. 1481), who married Sir John Langford of Aldworth in Berkshire.
- Anne Norreys (born c. 1482), who married firstly William Wroughton, and secondly Sir John Baldwin, Chief Justice of the Common Pleas
- Elizabeth Norreys (born c. 1484), who married William Fermor, esquire, of Somerton in Oxfordshire
- Jane Norreys(born c. 1483), who married John Cheney of West Woodhay in Berkshire, by whom she was the mother of John Cheney MP

As William Norreys's eldest son, Edward, had died in 1487, Edward's eldest son, John, inherited the family estates when his grandfather died about 10 January 1507.

== Notes ==
Political offices
Preceded by Sir John Howard	High Sheriff of Berkshire and Oxfordshire; 1468–1469	Succeeded by Thomas Prout
Preceded by Sir Thomas de la Mare	High Sheriff of Berkshire and Oxfordshire; 1481–1482	Succeeded by Thomas Kingston
Preceded by Sir Edmund Mountford	High Sheriff of Berkshire and Oxfordshire; 1486–1487	Succeeded by Thomas Saye
