= Baylis House =

Building in Slough, Berkshire, England

Coordinates: 51.5184°N 0.6041°W

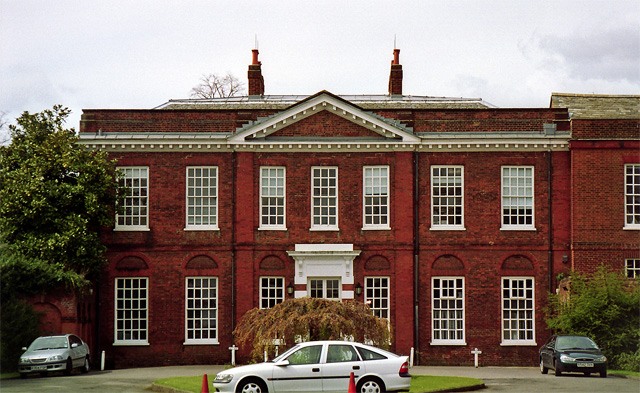
Baylis House

Baylis House is a Grade I listed building currently operating as a hotel and business centre in Slough, Berkshire, England. It is representative of the plain Dutch style that was popular in England after post-Civil war restoration of the English monarchy in 1660.

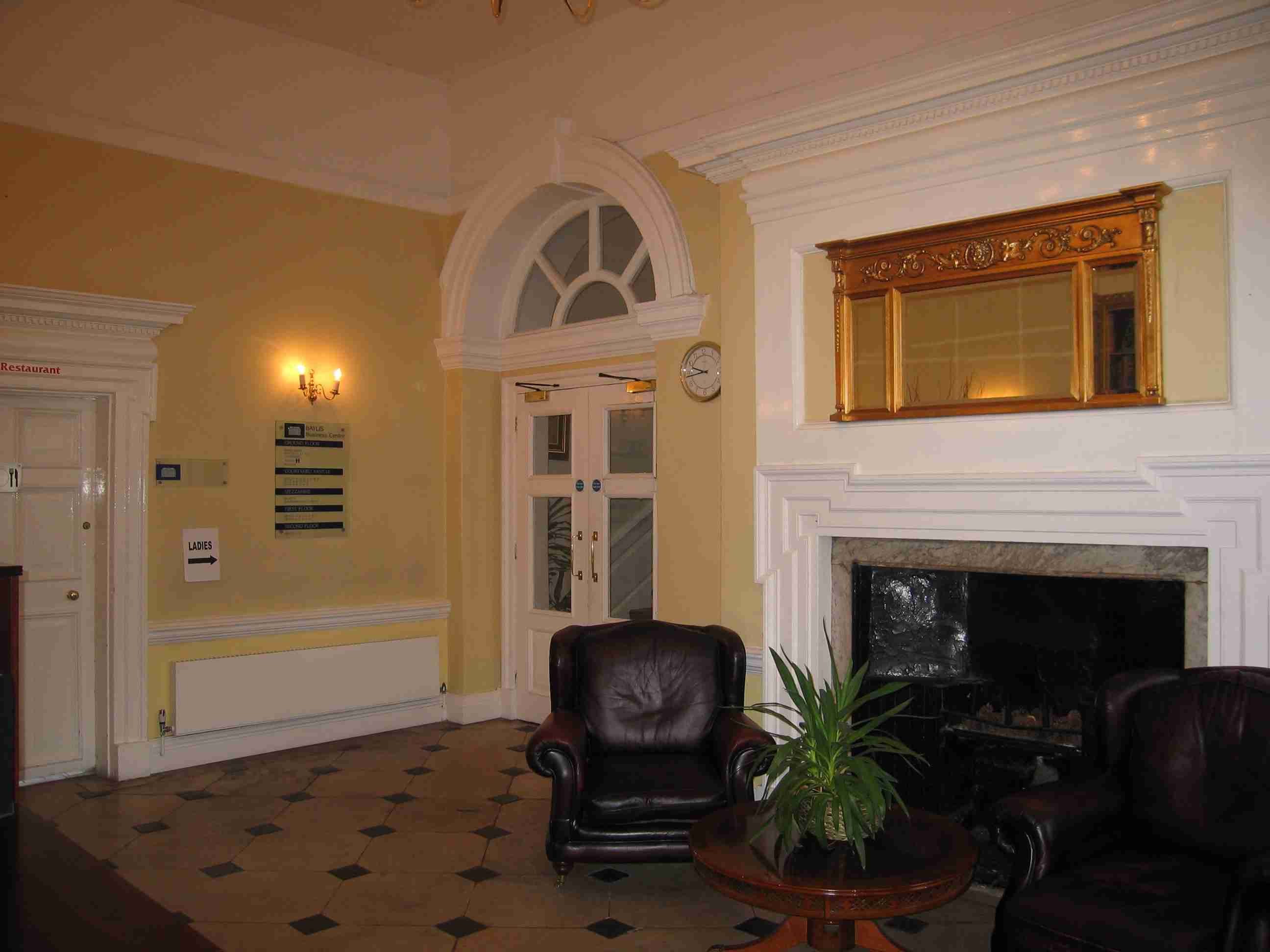
Baylis House Interior

Little is known of the original building that stood on the site of the current house. In the 16th century it was recorded as the 'manor of Bailis'. It formed part of the estate of Abraham Sybells at his death in 1501. The house, which was also known as "Whitmarsh" was excepted from a 1689 settlement between Dr. Sancroft, Archbishop of Canterbury, and Sir Robert Gayer and sold to Dr. Gregory Hascard, who had become Dean of Windsor in 1684.

Hascard rebuilt the house at the end of the 17th century. The designer is uncertain, but is likely to have been John James of Greenwich, Sir Christopher Wren or Hascard himself. The doctor owned Baylis House from the date of its completion in 1696 to his death in 1708 when Dr Henry Godolphin took ownership.

John James added a third storey in 1726 for Thomas Rowland, the Clerk of works to Windsor Castle. James continued extension and alteration work throughout the following decade, especially from 1733 to 1735 when Dr. Henry Godolphin, brother of Sidney Godolphin (Queen Anne's Lord High Treasurer) took ownership. He is credited with building the east wing stable block. The latter is now Godolphin Court, which has also been designated a Grade I listed building.

The Osborne family acquired the house in 1733, and tenants from this time included the fourth Earl of Chesterfield, and Alexander Wedderburn, Baron Loughborough. The Earl of Rosslyn died in the house in 1805.

From 1830 to 1907, Baylis House became the Saint James Roman Catholic School under William and James Butt. The school had previously operated from Richmond but moved due to size restrictions. The school farmed about 100 acres (0.40 km^{2}) and ran its own dairy, bakery and brewery. Even though these served most of the school's needs, it went bankrupt in 1907. George Godolphin Osborne, the tenth Duke of Leeds, sold it to a Mr Woods, who turned it into the Food Reform Establishment.

The house began to decline, and this did not change when it was operated as a hotel between 1924 and 1936, even though a swimming pool was added. Mr J B Whaley was the tenant at this time.

To prevent further deterioration, the house was bought by Slough Borough Council in 1939. Planned improvements were postponed with the onset of war in 1939. It became the headquarters of Air Raid Precautions. Post war changes included development of the grounds as a sports and recreation centre.

Urwick Orr and Partners (now the Urwick Group) leased Baylis House from 1958. It became a centre for management training, and was an incubator for the first wave of experts involved in the introduction and development of computers into the business world.

A fire in 1954 forced the removal of the 1726 third storey.
