= Bere Court =

Grade I listed historic house in Pangbourne, Berkshire, United Kingdom

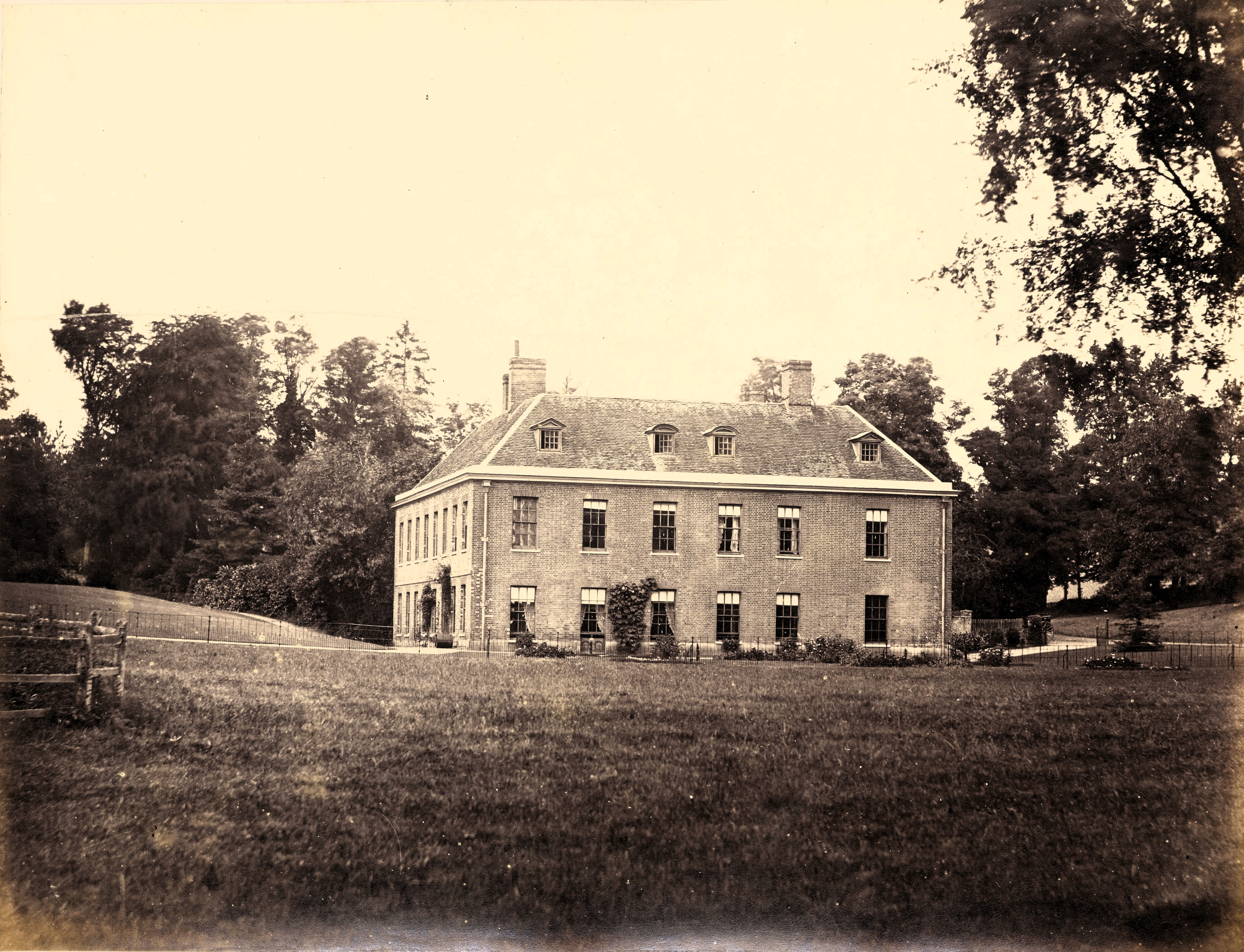
- Bere Court in 1866

- Location within Berkshire Location within England
- 51°28′15″N 1°06′51″W
- Type: Country House
- Location: Pangbourne, Berkshire, England
- OS grid reference: SU 61630 75016

History
- Built: 13th century
- Rebuilt: 18th century

Site notes
- Architectural style: Georgian

Listed Building – Grade I
- Official name: Bere Court and Bere House
- Designated: 24 October 1951; 74 years ago
- Reference no.: 1213565

Bere Court is an English country house. It is a historic Grade I listed building. The house is located southwest of Pangbourne, Berkshire where it was once the manor house.

== History ==
The house was originally built in the 13th century as the manor house for Pangbourne. The only remaining parts of the original house are the medieval cellars.

Pangbourne came under the control of the Abbots of Reading and the house became one of their main manors.

In his role as Abbot of Reading, Hugh Faringdon was residing at Bere Court in 1539 when he was arrested for high treason during the dissolution of the monasteries, ostensibly for providing funds to rebels. While he was taken to the Tower of London, apparently his death sentence was passed without a formal trial, and he was hanged, drawn, and quartered in the courtyard of Reading Abbey on 14 November 1539.

In 1613 the house was acquired by Sir John Davis, who had been part of the Duke of Essex's Rebellion in 1601, had been convicted, and sentenced to death, but then pardoned.

The estate was purchased in 1671 by John Breedon, onetime High Sheriff of Berkshire. The current form of the house is his family's work. It was remodeled over the course of the 18th century into its current red brick Georgian design.

During the time the Breedons owned the house they occasionally rented it out. One of the renters was George Spencer-Churchill, 6th Duke of Marlborough who had been born at nearby Bill Hill.

The Breedons finally sold the house in the 1890s. As of 2024 it was a private residence.

== See also ==
- Pangbourne
- Pangbourne College
- Reading Abbey
