= Chazey Court Barn =

17th-century building in Berkshire, England

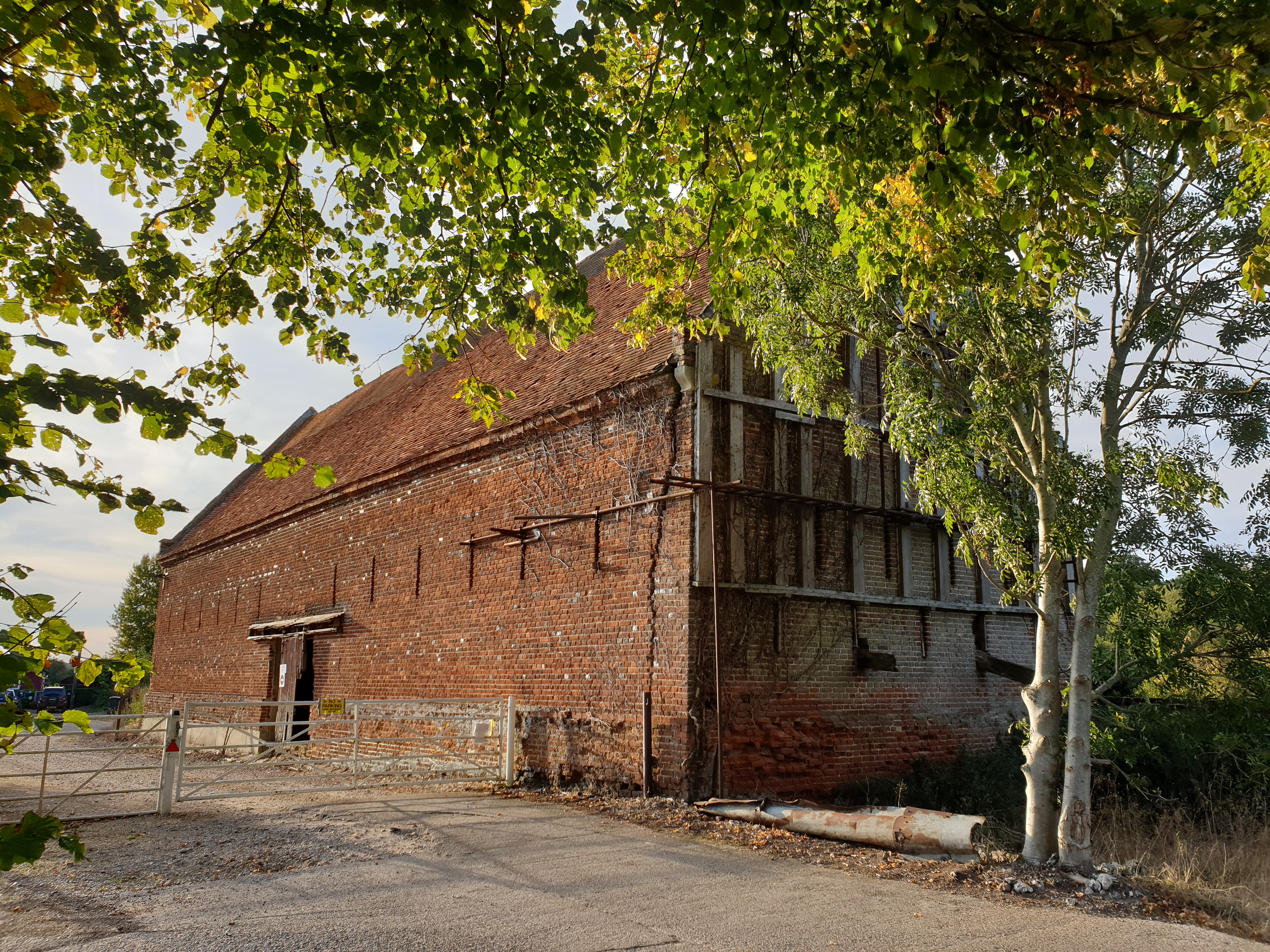
- The barn from the south-east

- Location within Reading, Berkshire
- 51°28′16.32″N 1°0′20.59″W
- Type: Barn

Listed Building – Grade I
- Official name: Large barn to south-east of Chazey Court farmhouse
- Designated: 24 October 1951
- Reference no.: 1113603

Chazey Court Barn is a 17th-century Grade I listed building in the town of Reading in England. It forms part of the Chazey Court Farm complex and is situated close to the Thames at the western end of The Warren in the suburb of Caversham.

The barn is a large 7 bay building with a steep roof, built of red brick. It displays a very similar construction style to Mapledurham House, an Elizabethan stately home some 1.5 miles (2.4 km) to the north-west of the barn. The barn is categorised by English Heritage as being in very bad condition, subject to immediate risk of further rapid deterioration or loss of fabric, and with no solution agreed with the owners. It is not in use, and has visible structural cracking, whilst the gable has temporary shoring. In early 2020 it was reported that the owners were to be issued with a final notice by Reading Borough Council, indicating that if necessary the council would carry out the necessary works on behalf of the owner and pass on the costs to them.

Work undertaken by Oxford Archaeology and using dendrochronology techniques dates the construction of the barn to 1611 or shortly thereafter, and also indicates that the other buildings of the farm complex date from a similar date or later. Research undertaken by the Oxfordshire Record Society in 1925 suggest that the farmhouse was the site of the Manor of Mapledurham Chazey, acquired in 1582 by the owners of the adjoining estate of Mapledurham Gurney in order to create the current Mapledurham estate. They surmise that the new owners, who also built Mapledurham House at around the same time, demolished the old manorial buildings and replaced them with new farm buildings.

== Gallery ==
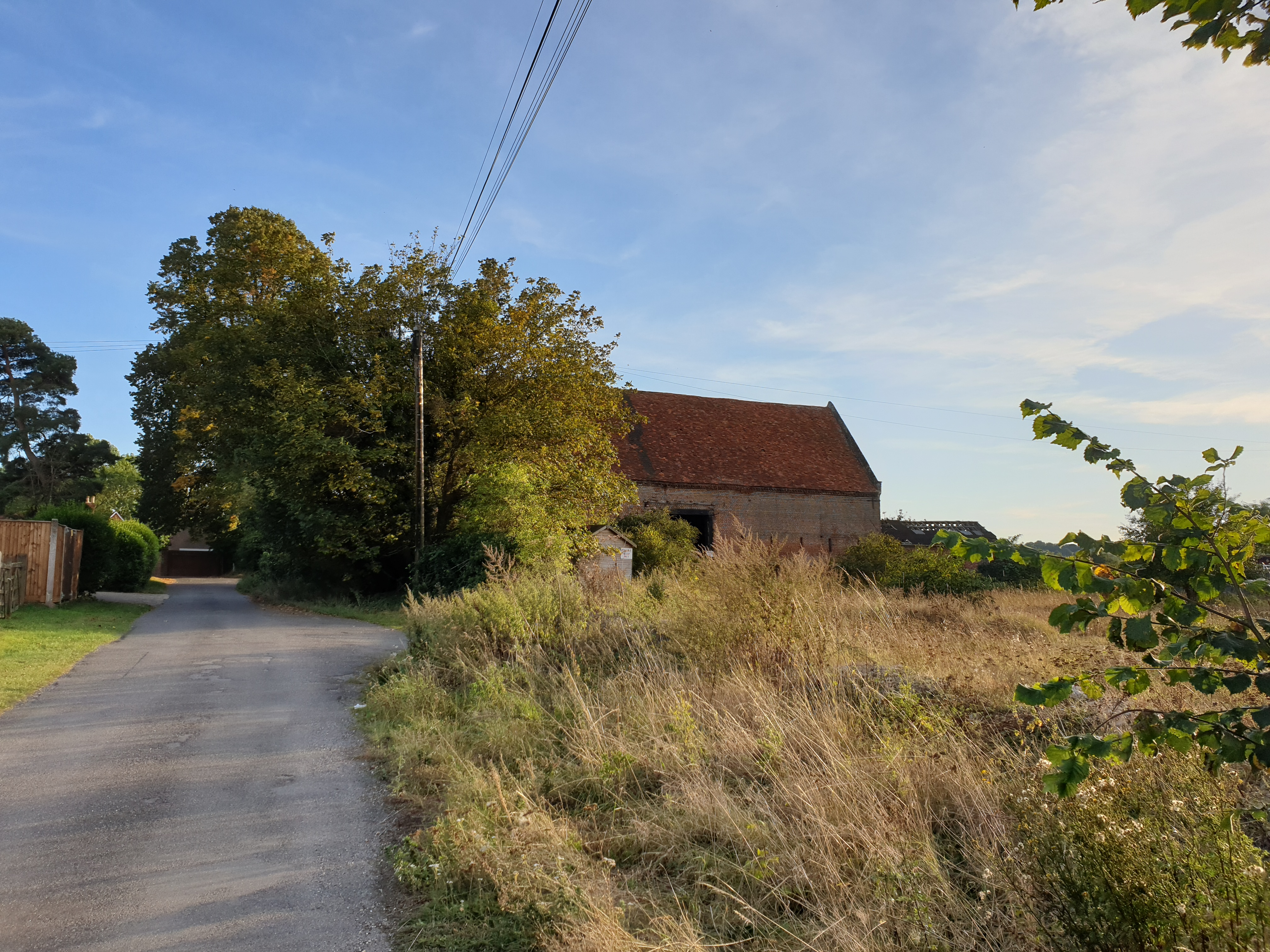
Approach to the barn from The Warren

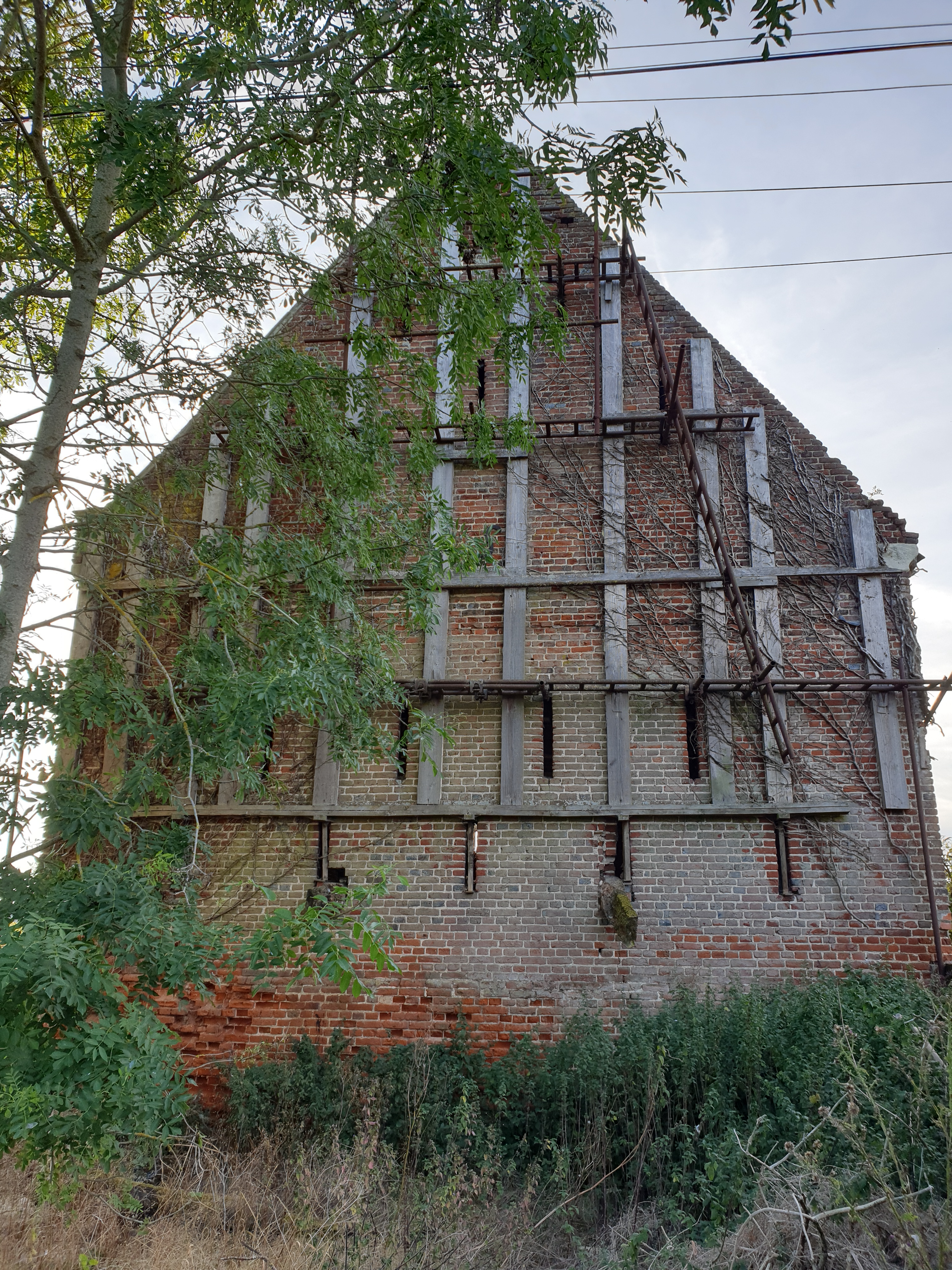
The gable end of the barn

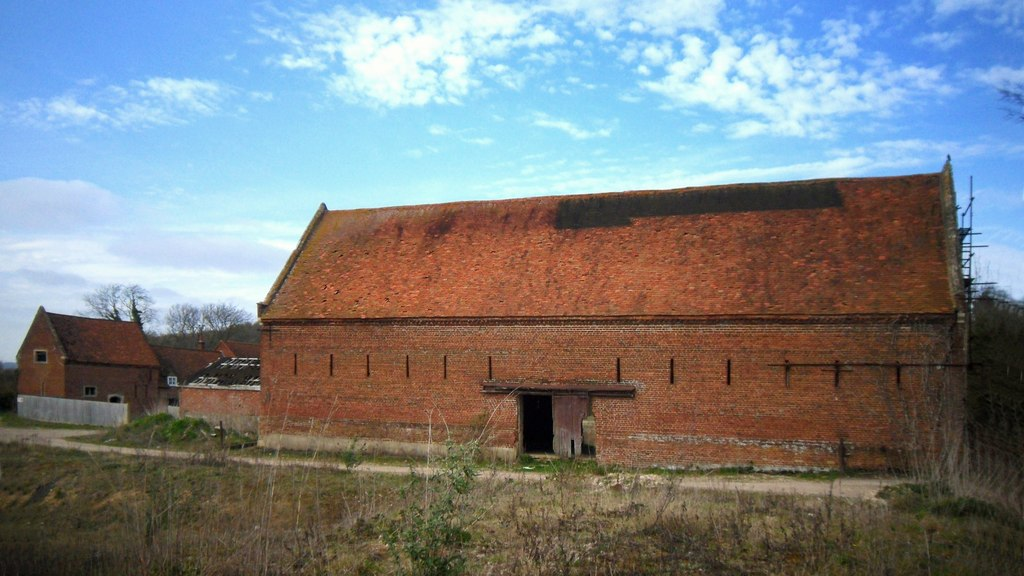
The barn, with farmhouse to the left
