= Church of St James the Great, Ruscombe =

Church in Berkshire, England

Coordinates: 51°28′48″N 0°51′08″W

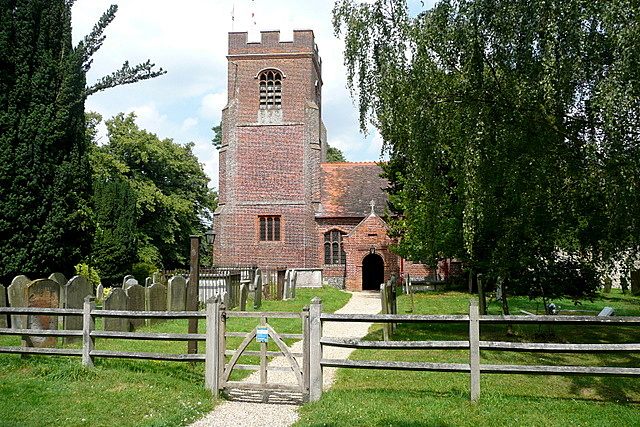
St James' Church, Ruscombe

The Church of St James the Great is a Church of England parish church in Ruscombe, Berkshire, England. It is a grade I listed building.

The church of St James the Great was built in the late 12th century. Its Norman chancel built with flint survives but its nave and west tower were rebuilt in 1638–39 in brick. Additional modifications were made in the 1800s, including the addition of an organ chamber and the "restoration" on the interior of the church. The church has been a grade I listed building since 1967.

St James' is part of a united benefice with St Mary's Church, Twyford. The benefice is in turn part of a local ecumenical partnership with Twyford United Reformed Church. In March 2020, the partnerships included St Mary's Twyford, St Nicholas Hurst, St James Ruscombe and Twyford United Reformed Church.
