= Ascot Place =

Country house in Berkshire, England

Coordinates: 51°26′01″N 0°41′10″W

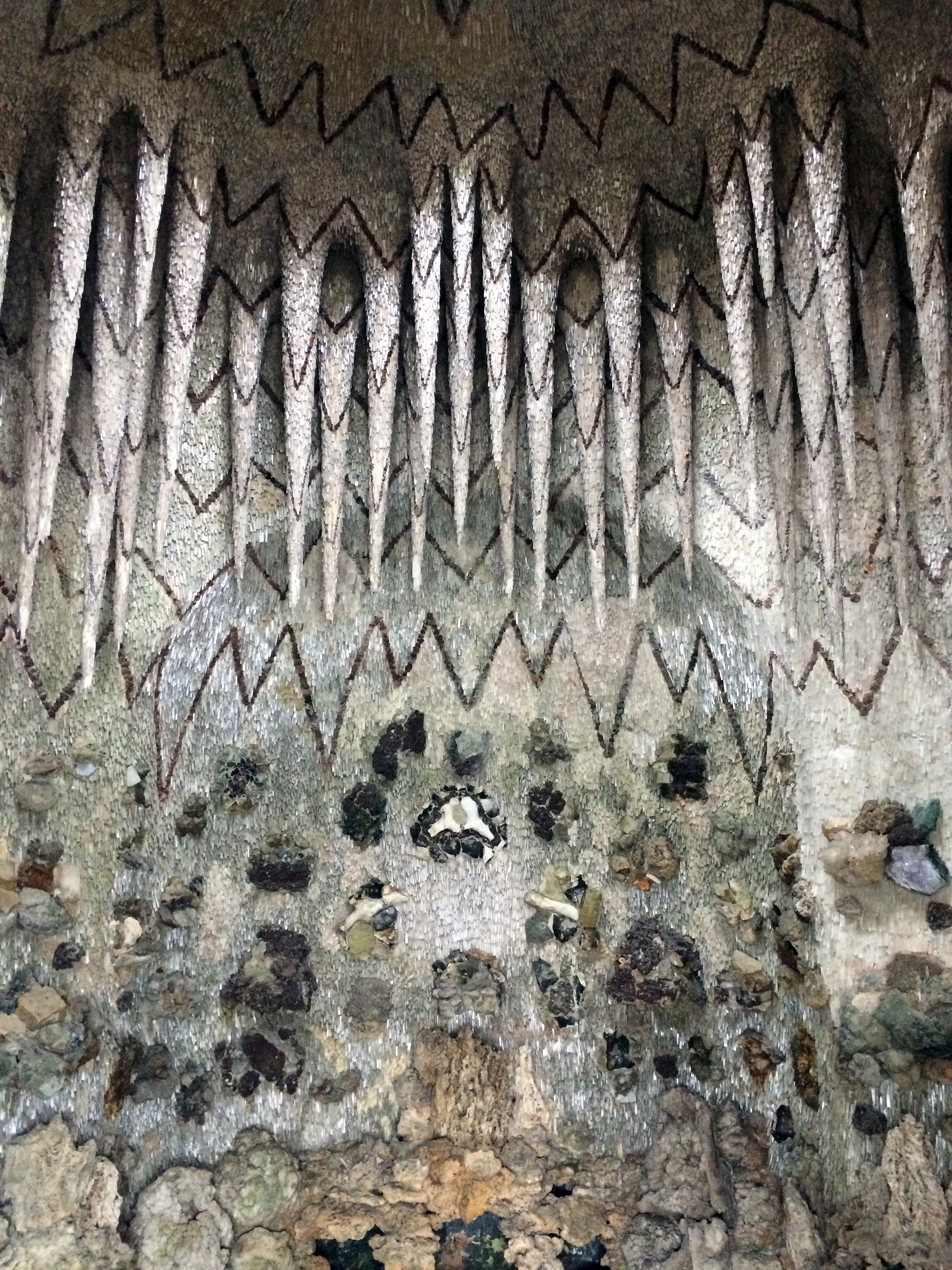
The Grade I listed Grotto

Ascot Place is an 18th-century mansion on the edge of Windsor Great Park, set in 400 acres (1.6 km^{2}) of parkland between Cranbourne, North Ascot and Winkfield in the English county of Berkshire.

It is located close to Windsor Great Park and Ascot Racecourse. The mansion itself and various statues and other structures in its garden are Grade II listed, whilst a grotto to the south of house and at west end of lake is Grade I listed.

Records of Ascot Place date back to 1339, with owners including baked beans tycoon H.J. "Jack" Heinz II. In 1989 the house was bought by Khalifa bin Zayed bin Sultan Al Nahyan, the emir of Abu Dhabi.
