= The Copper Horse =

Statue of George III in Windsor, England

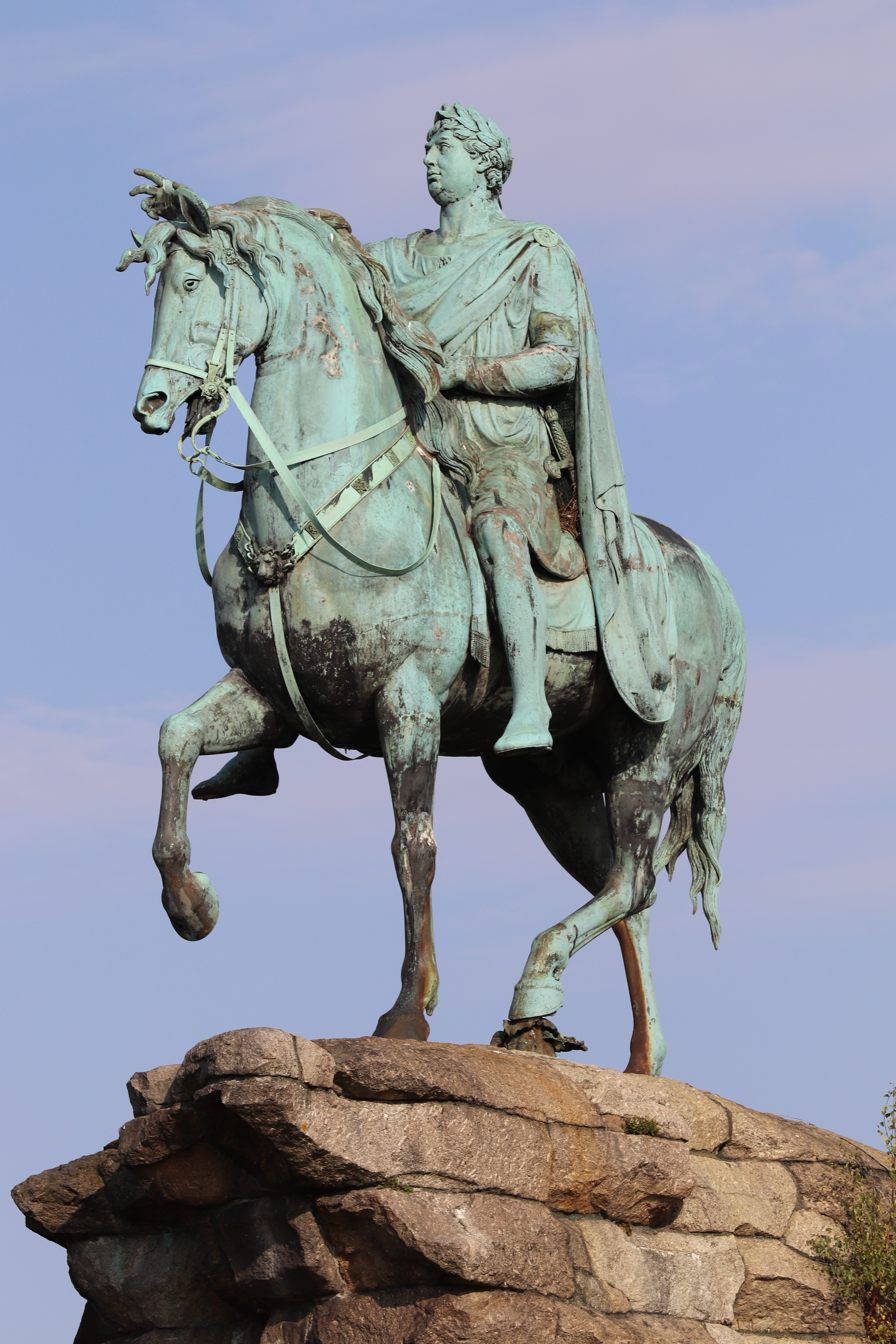
- Statue of George III riding a horse, pointing at Windsor Castle, photographed in 2020
- Snow Hill in Windsor Great Park
- Artist: Richard Westmacott
- Year: 1821a
- Completion date: October 1831
- Medium: bronze
- Subject: George III
- Location: 51.4451°N 0.6093°W
- Owner: The Crown Estate

Designations

Listed Building – Grade I
- Official name: Statue of George III, Windsor Great Park
- Designated: 5 February 1997
- Reference no.: 1323671

The Copper Horse is an 1831 equestrian statue of George III. The monumental bronze statue by Richard Westmacott stands on a stone plinth at Snow Hill in Windsor Great Park in the English county of Berkshire, at the southern end of the Long Walk, a tree-lined avenue which leads in a straight line about 2.65 mi (4.26 km) from the George IV Gateway at Windsor Castle. It became a Grade I listed building in 1972.

== Background ==
The statue was announced in January 1821 by George IV, to commemorate his late father George III, who had died one year before. George IV had visited Westmacott's studio in December 1820, where he saw a smaller equestrian statue of George III that had been commissioned by the Liverpool Corporation to celebrate the Golden Jubilee of George III, ten years earlier, delayed through very slow collection of public subscriptions. That smaller statue, now displayed in Monument Place, Liverpool, depicts George III in classical garb, mounted on a horse, with his right arm outstretched, in the manner of the second century Equestrian Statue of Marcus Aurelius in Rome. Westmacott had studied in Rome in the 1790s under Antonio Canova.

The avenue of trees of the Long Walk, leading from Windsor Castle to Snow Hill, was created by Charles II. The hilltop was the proposed site for several earlier monuments - the Duke of Cumberland planned to reconstruct the Holbein Gate from Whitehall there, and Charles Kelsall proposed a new Temple of Diana – but none came to fruition, so the site was still vacant. According to contemporary newspapers in January 1821, George IV ordered "a full length statue in bronze of George III to be erected on the top of Snow Hill, Windsor Park, with his hand pointing towards his favourite residence, Windsor Castle".

== Description ==
The statue depicts George III on horseback, in the style of a Roman emperor, wearing a laurel wreath and toga, riding without stirrups. The statue is reminiscent of the Equestrian Statue of Marcus Aurelius in Rome. The high stone base also leads to comparisons with the Bronze Horseman, an equestrian statue of Peter the Great unveiled in Saint Petersburg in 1782.

A c.1821 drawing attributed to John Nash shows a similar equestrian statue of George III, but the subject is much younger and the statue is mounted on a regular rectangular plinth oriented to the northwest. This may be a drawing of the proposal: Nash is not known to have been involved in the design of the statue, which is attributed to Richard Westmacott.

The monumental bronze statue, larger than life size, is about 26 ft (7.9 m) high. Westmacott's statue has an iron frame clad in bronze (not copper, despite its common name, although bronze is a copper alloy) which has developed a deep blue-green verdigris patina. It is mounted atop a large stone base which is a further 27 ft (8.2 m) high and measures 36 ft × 28 ft (11.0 m × 8.5 m) at its base. The stone base, designed by Jeffry Wyatville, is composed of flat stones with irregular rustication. It is oriented east–west so George III turns slightly to his right and gestures with his right hand north towards Windsor Castle. Other irregular stones are scattered around the statue at top of Snow Hill. The base bears the ironic inscription in Latin: Georgio Tertio / Patri optimo / Georgius Rex, which translates as: 'To George the Third / the best of fathers / King George [IV]'. Like so many father–son relationships in the Hanoverian family, however, George III and George IV were known to have despised one another.

Westmacott was formally commissioned in 1824, and the Duke of Wellington (then Master-General of the Ordnance) authorised the release of 25 tons of obsolete brass cannons to him the following year, to be melted down for the casting. Sections of metal for the statue were cast before October 1828, by which time it had already been christened the "Copper Horse". The statue is credited as a key turning point in the revival of bronze statuary in the UK.

The stone base took several more years to complete, built around a 16 ft (4.9 m) tall brick core sunk 8 ft (2.4 m) into the ground. George IV laid a foundation stone on his birthday in August 1829, but the statue was not finally installed until 31 October 1831, over a year after his own death. The total cost was over £18,700 for the statue and about £10,000 for the plinth.

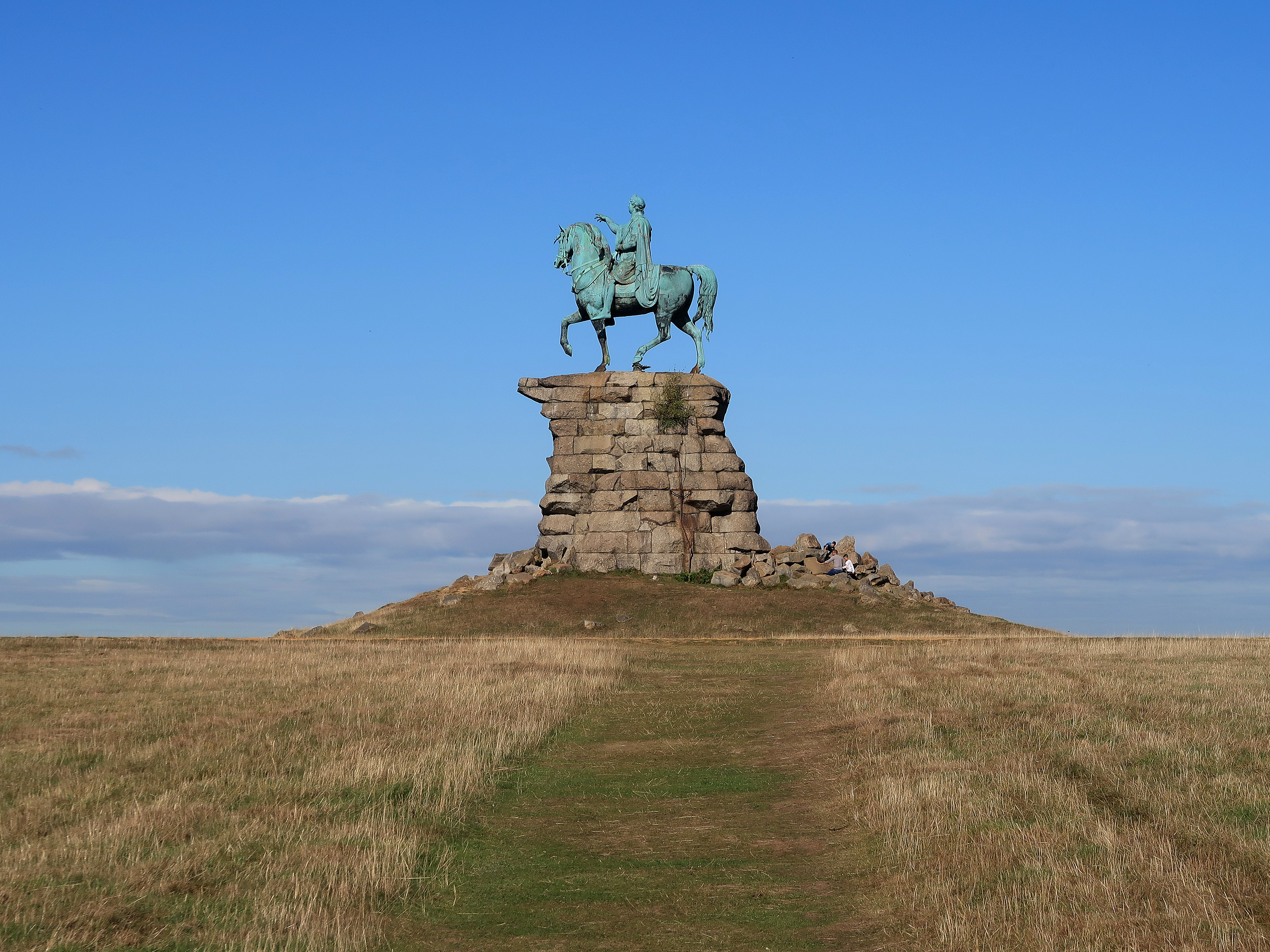
The statue in 2018

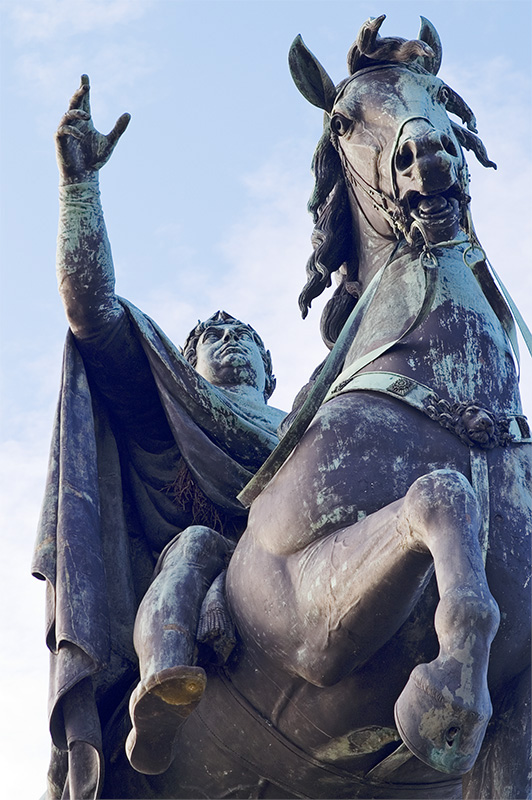
Close up from 2006

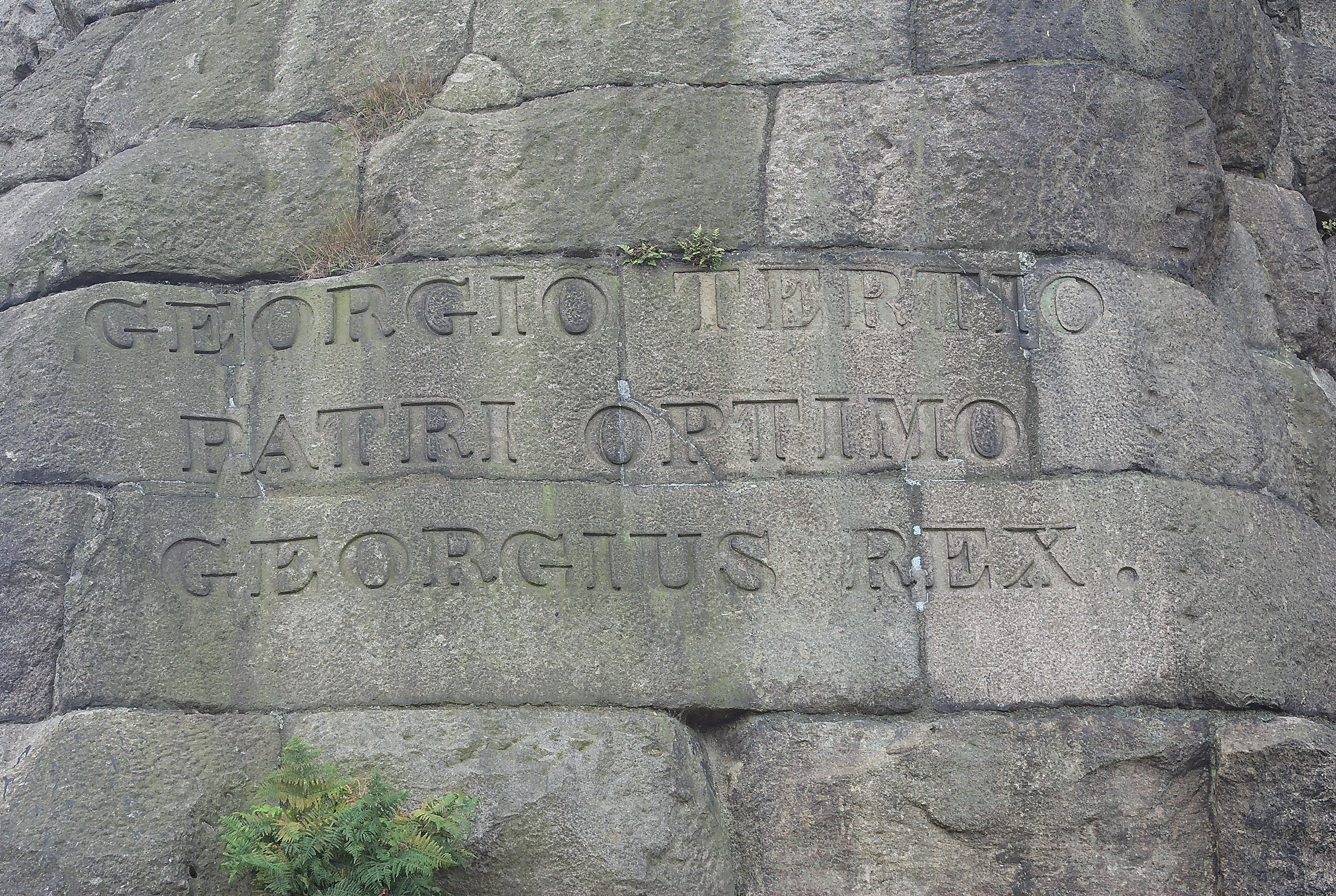
Inscription on stone base

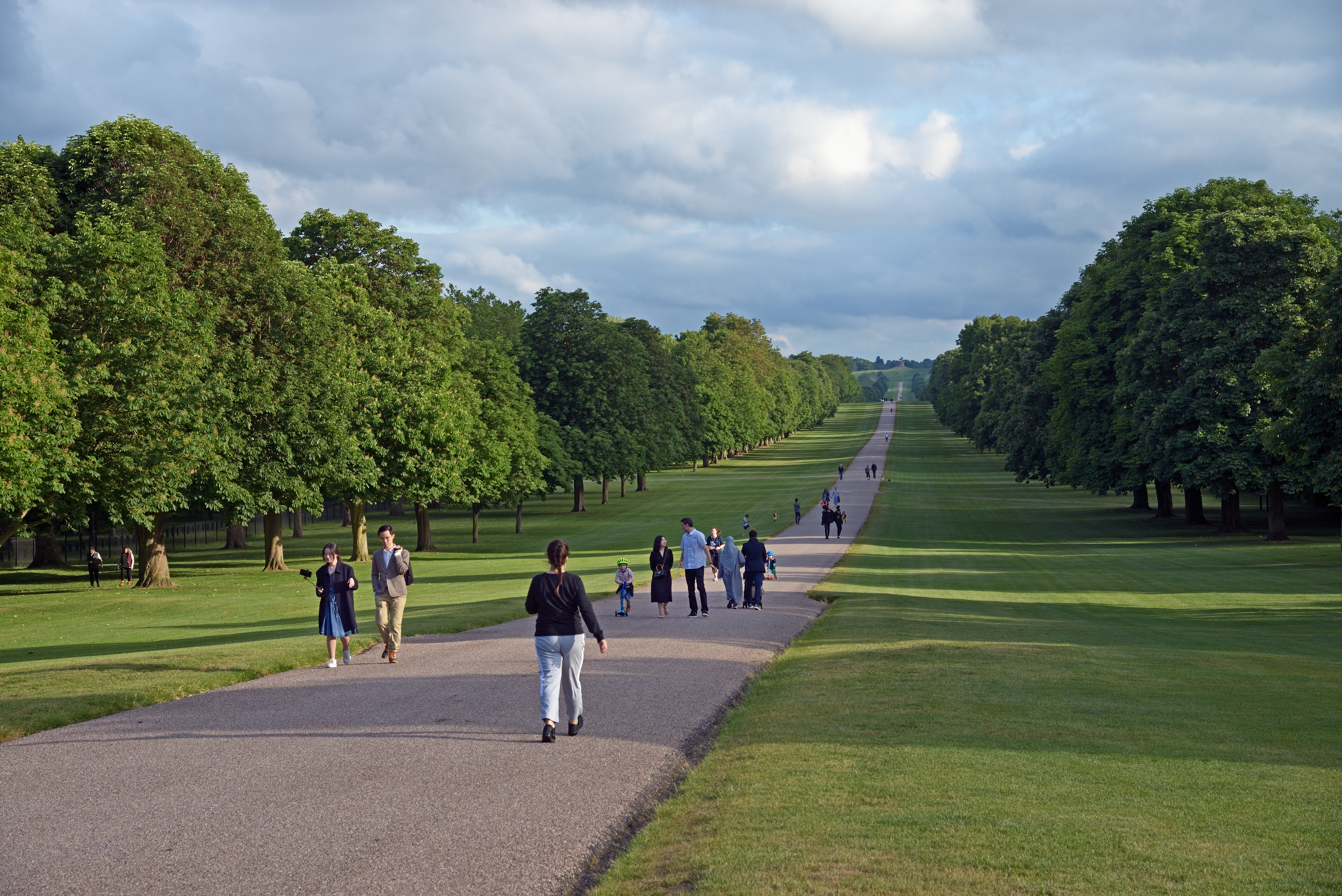
The Long Walk, leading to the Copper Horse

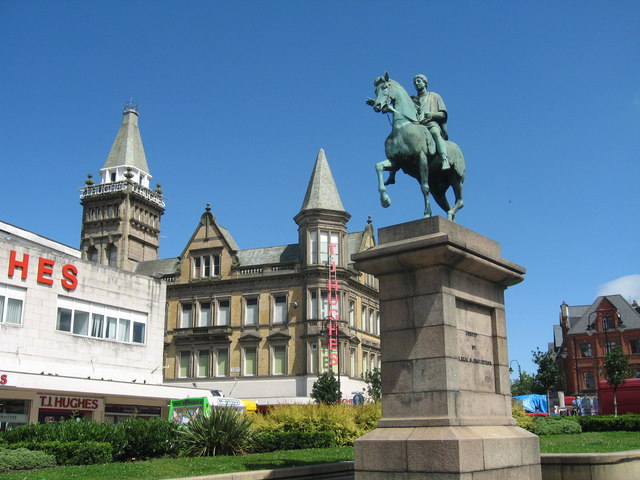
Westmacott's statue of George III in Liverpool
