= Yattendon Castle =

Castle in England

- Yattendon, Berkshire, England

Site information
- Type: Fortified manor house
- Condition: Limited earthworks

Location
- Shown within Berkshire
- Location within Berkshire
- Coordinates: 51.4676°N 1.2059°W
- Grid reference: grid reference SU55267459

Site history
- Events: English Civil War

Yattendon Castle was a fortified manor house located in the civil parish of Yattendon, in the hundred of Faircross, in the English county of Berkshire.

== History ==
The site upon which Yattendon castle stood was originally occupied by a moated manor house. This house was held by Sir Richard Merbrook by the early 15th century. His daughter, Alice, married Sir John Norreys of Ockwells (d. 1 September 1466), a Knight of the Shire for Berkshire, and keeper of the wardrobe for King Henry VI. The castle was then in the ownership of the Norreys family for over 200 years.

Sir John bought many neighbouring estates and received a Royal licence to crenellate the manor house on 20 January 1448 and to empark some 600 acres (2.4 km^{2}). John and Alice's son, Sir William Norreys (1433 – 4 January 1507) later inherited the castle. He was among the army Henry VII brought from Brittany in 1485 and was present at the Battle of Bosworth.

The castle was probably the residence of William's eldest son Sir Edward Norreys (d. 1487) during his father's lifetime. Edward Norreys was the father of two sons: Sir John Norreys (1481 – 21 October 1564), who inherited the castle, but died without legitimate issue, and Sir Henry Norreys, who was beheaded in 1536 for his supposed affair with Anne Boleyn. The castle then passed to Edward's grandson, Henry Norris, 1st Baron Norreys (1525–1601), the son of the above-mentioned Sir Henry Norreys. Henry Norreys was a lifelong friend of Elizabeth I and was the father of six sons, who included Sir John Norreys, a famous English soldier.

The castle was largely destroyed by Parliamentary forces during the English Civil War. A new manor house was built on the site in 1785. Traces of the moat can still be seen today.

== Royal visitors ==
- Henry VIII and Catherine of Aragon were visitors at Yattendon Castle in 1520. While there, it is said that the Queen's lady-in-waiting, Anne Boleyn, of whom the King was already enamoured, dropped her handkerchief during a dance. It was retrieved by Sir Henry Norreys. This incident, later referred to as "Queen Anne's Dance", would be used as evidence, during Anne and Norreys' trials, to support rumours of their affair.
- Princess Elizabeth stayed at Yattendon Castle on her way to imprisonment at Woodstock.
- Anne of Denmark, Queen Consort of King James VI and I, visited Yattendon, probably in September 1603.

== See also ==
- Castles in Great Britain and Ireland
- List of castles in England
