= Old Bluecoat School, Thatcham =

Old Bluecoat School
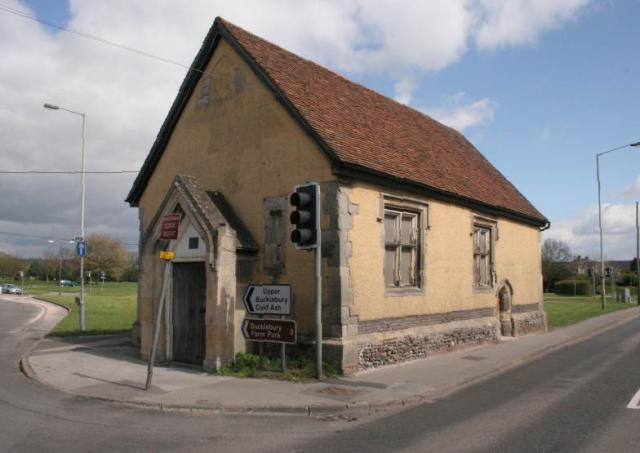
- Old Bluecoat School in 2005

- Location within Berkshire
- Former names: St Thomas’ Chapel

General information
- Status: Grade I listed building
- Type: Chapel
- Location: Thatcham, Berkshire, England
- Coordinates: 51°24′13.89″N 1°15′4.65″W
- Construction started: 1304
- Owner: Thatcham Town Council

Website
- oldbluecoatschool.org.uk

Old Bluecoat School, or the St Thomas’ Chapel is a Grade I listed building in the town of Thatcham in the English county of Berkshire. It is located on the main A4 road.

== History ==
=== St Thomas’ Chapel ===
Construction completed and opened for worship in 1304, it was designated by the Bishop of Salisbury as a chapel dedicated St Thomas for the borough of Thatcham. It remained an active chapel until some time in the 16th Century before falling into disuse for another 150 years. An account of Lady Francis Winchcombe in the conveyance and trust deed in 1707, it was stated that it is spoken of as an old decayed chapel.

=== Bluecoat School ===
In 1707, the Chapel of St. Thomas was remodeled into a school for poor boys called Winchcombe Charity, in honor of its founder Lady Frances Winchcombe. It earned the name "Bluecoat" from the uniform worn by its students.
