= St Thomas' Church, East Shefford =

Coordinates: 51.4698°N 1.4391°W

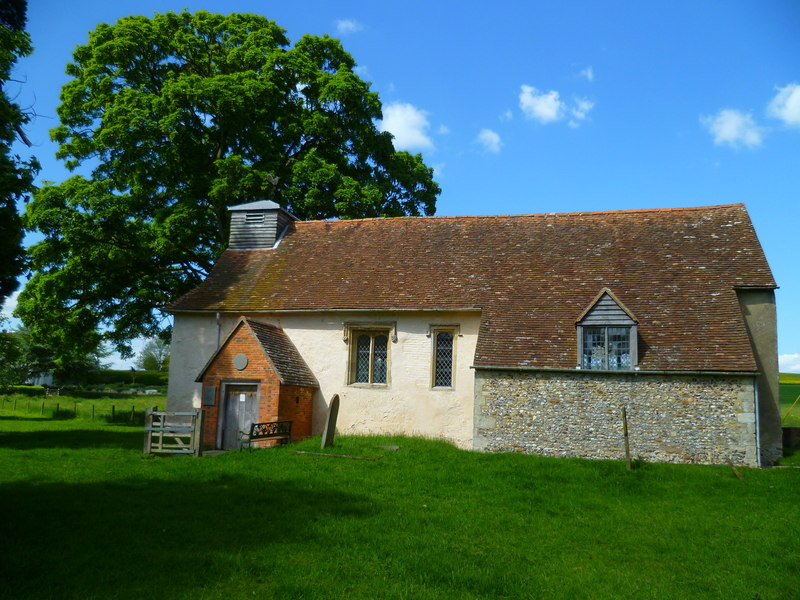

- Location in Berkshire
- OS grid reference: SU 391 747
- Location: East Shefford, Berkshire
- Country: England
- Denomination: Anglican
- Website: Churches Conservation Trust

Architecture
- Functional status: Redundant
- Heritage designation: Grade I
- Designated: 11 July 1983
- Architectural type: Church
- Style: Norman, Gothic
- Closed: 1870

Specifications
- Materials: Flint and stone, partly rendered Roofs tiled

St Thomas' Church is a redundant Church of England parish church at East Shefford in the English county of Berkshire. It is recorded in the National Heritage List for England as a designated Grade I listed building, and is under the care of the Churches Conservation Trust. The church stands in an isolated position at the end of a private drive overlooking the River Lambourn, to the southeast of the village of Great Shefford.

== History ==
The church has its origins in the pre-Norman era, but the earliest fabric in the present church dates from the later part of the 11th century. The chancel was added in the 13th century, a south chapel in the 16th century, and a south porch in the 18th century. Worship ceased in the church in 1870, and its congregation went to a new church dedicated to the Holy Innocents, which has since been demolished. The church was restored in 1887. The parish of East Shefford amalgamated with the parish of West Shefford in 1926, becoming the parish of Great Shefford. In 1958 there were plans to demolish St Thomas' but this was prevented by the Friends of Friendless Churches. The church was vested in the Redundant Churches Fund, the forerunner of the Churches Conservation Trust in 1972.

== Architecture ==
=== Exterior ===
The church is constructed in flint and stone, with stone dressings. Parts of the walls are rendered. The roofs are tiled. Its plan is simple and consists of a nave with a brick south porch, and a chancel with a south chapel. At the west end is a wooden bellcote with a lead roof. The nave has a Norman north window and, to its west, a three-light window. In the south wall of the nave is a two-light and a single-light window. The chancel has a four-light window in its north wall and a three-light east window. Cutting through the roof of the chapel is a dormer window.

=== Interior ===
The major feature inside the church is the alabaster effigial monument of Thomas Fettiplace, who died in 1447, and his wife, Beatrice, who died in 1442. Beatrice was supposedly a member of the royal family of Portugal. On the north wall of the chancel is an altar tomb to John Fettiplace, who died in 1524, and his wife Dorothy. The tomb is plain but it is surrounded by canopy containing brasses. On the floor of the chancel are 16th-century tiles. The font is Norman and has a cylindrical limestone bowl. On the south side of the chancel is a Norman limestone pillar piscina. On the wall above the chancel arch are 12th-century paintings, and on other walls are painted texts.

== See also ==
- List of churches preserved by the Churches Conservation Trust in South East England
