= Cox Green, Berkshire =

Civil parish in Berkshire, England

Coordinates: 51.508°N 0.742°W

Cox Green
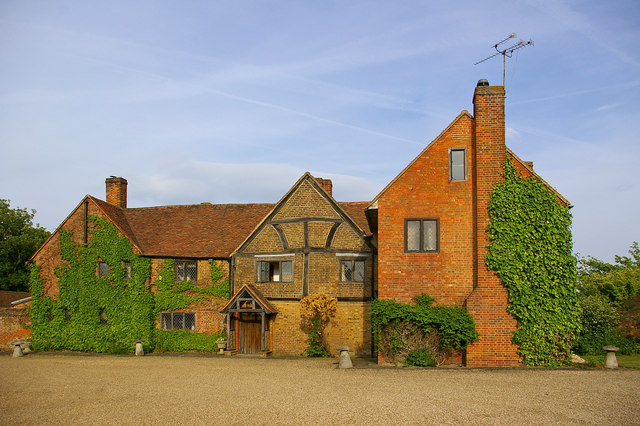
- Lillibrooke Manor

- Location within Berkshire
- Population: 7,505 (2011 Census)
- OS grid reference: SU8679
- Civil parish: Cox Green
- Unitary authority: Windsor and Maidenhead
- Ceremonial county: Berkshire
- Region: South East
- Country: England
- Sovereign state: United Kingdom
- Post town: MAIDENHEAD
- Postcode district: SL6
- Dialling code: 01628
- Police: Thames Valley
- Fire: Royal Berkshire
- Ambulance: South Central
- UK Parliament: Maidenhead

Cox Green is a civil parish in the Royal Borough of Windsor and Maidenhead in Berkshire, England. It is a large suburb of Maidenhead with most of its housing lying west of the A404(M) Maidenhead bypass and south of the A4 road. The remainder of this area is rural. The parish has an urban boundary with Woodlands Park to the southwest, and a rural boundary with White Waltham parish to the west.

== History ==
The original village was ecclesiastically a hamlet under Bray church that had a nucleus by Cox Green Lane, Cox Green Road and Norden Road, south of the railway (see map of 1945 here). Parts of this are now outside the current parish boundary. The second half of the 20th century saw a rapid expansion of housing, including Woodlands Park to the west, and Cox Green is now part of the wider urban area of Maidenhead.

== Geography ==
Cox Green has a site of Special Scientific Interest (SSSI) on the southern edge of the village, called Great Thrift Wood.

== Amenities and listed buildings ==
Schools in the area include Lowbrook School and Wessex Primary School, both catering for ages up to eleven (Year 6), and Cox Green School, for children aged 11–18. Cox Green School shares a site with the adjacent Community Centre on Highfield Lane, providing such local facilities as a library and both indoor and outdoor sports facilities. Additional leisure facilities exist at Ockwells Park, where there are sports fields, an open park and a local nature reserve, a children's play area, and an outdoor gym.

The parish church, Church of the Good Shepherd, is in the Community Centre in Highfield Lane.

The oldest building in the parish is Ockwells Manor, built in the 15th century. It is next to Ockwells Park, part of which once formed part of the Manor's grounds.

A Roman villa was discovered from aerial photographs in the 1950s and was fully excavated in 1959 in advance of the building of the present housing estate.

== Nearest places ==
Maidenhead (town centre) 3 miles; Reading 12 miles; Windsor 8 miles.
