= Ockwells =

Country house in Southern England

Coordinates: 51.5022°N 0.7408°W

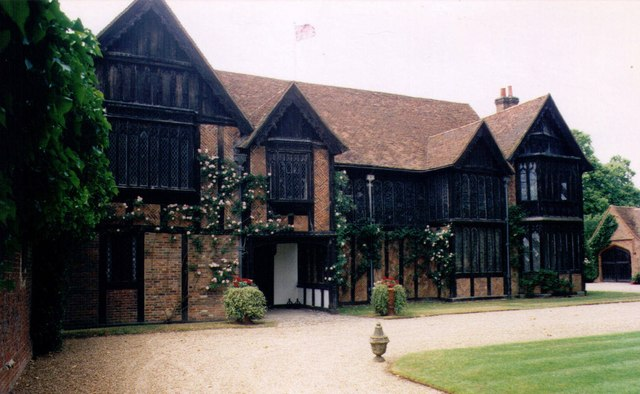
Ockwells Manor House, Cox Green - geograph.org.uk - 1556692

Ockwells Manor is a 13,838 sq ft (1,285.6 m^{2}) timber-framed 15th century manor house in the civil parish of Cox Green, adjoining Maidenhead, in the English county of Berkshire. It was previously in the parish of Bray. The manor used to own most of the land that is now Ockwells Park.

Ockwells is an early example of a manor built without fortifications, which Sir Nikolaus Pevsner called "the most refined and the most sophisticated timber-framed mansion in England". It preserves a superb set of contemporary heraldic stained glass in the hall. Many of its bargeboards and other exterior timbers are run with rich mouldings and carved. Herringbone brickwork provides the infill.

== History ==
The manor was originally given, in 1283, to Richard le Norreys, the chief cook to Queen Eleanor. It passed down through the Norreys family, ending up in the possession of Sir John Norreys, Keeper of the Wardrobe to Henry VI, who started re-building the manor in 1446.

In the windows of the great hall, Sir John inserted beautiful stained glass, proudly showcasing his Lancastrian connections by displaying the arms of his friends at Court:

- the King
- the Queen
- the Duke of Warwick
- Duke of Somerset
- Duke of Suffolk
- Bishop of Salisbury
- James Butler, 1st Earl of Wiltshire
- Sir John Wenlock, Baron Wenlock
- Baron Mortimer of Chirk
- Sir William Laken
- Sir Richard Nanfan
- Sir John Langford
- John Purye
- Richard Bulstrode
- Abingdon Abbey

The Norreys family lived there until 1517. At that time, Sir John's great-grandson, also Sir John, had to surrender the estate in return for a pardon after having murdered a certain John Enhold of Nettlebed. Ockwells was then owned by Sir John's uncle, Sir Thomas Fettiplace. It passed through the Fettiplace family, before being owned by the Day family.

In 1942 Ockwells' owner, Sir Edward Barry, wished to sell the estate to the National Trust for £75,000. James Lees-Milne, Secretary of the Country Houses Committee of the National Trust, could not justify this sum, and therefore the property was never handed over to the Trust. Lees-Milne revisited Ockwells in 1973 with architectural historian John Cornforth, who commented that the property is an 'over-restored fake' and deemed it too unimportant for the National Trust.

== Sources and external links ==
- Royal Berkshire History: Ockwells Manor

Media related to Ockwells Manor House, Cox Green at Wikimedia Commons
