= Norris (surname) =

Norris is an English surname. In some cases it is derived from the Middle English norreis, noreis, norais; and the Anglo-Norman French noreis. In such cases the surname derived from elements meaning "northerner", and referred to people from somewhere to the north, or more generally northern England and Scotland or Northern Europe. In other cases, the surname is derived from the Middle English personal name Norreis, which is in turn derived from norreis. In other cases the surname is derived from the Middle English norice, nurice; and the Old French norrice, nurrice. In such cases, the surname is derived from elements meaning "nurse", "foster parent".

== Notable people ==
=== Surname ===
- Aaron Norris (born 1951), American actor and filmmaker, younger brother of Chuck Norris.
- Alex Norris (cartoonist) Welsh cartoonist and author
- Andrea Norris, American information technology executive and civil servant
- Anthony Norris (born 1963), American professional wrestler, ring name Ahmed Johnson
- Antony Norris (1711–1786), English antiquarian
- Ben Norris, several people
  - Ben Norris (actor) (born 1991/1992), British actor, playwright and poet
  - Ben Norris (artist) (1910–2006), American artist
  - Ben Norris (comedian) (active 1993–present), British standup comic
- Bonita Norris (born 1987), British mountain climber
- Bruce Norris (1924–1986), American businessman and owner of the Detroit Red Wings (1952–1982)
- Carli Norris (born 1974), English actress
- Charles Norris, several people
- Chester E. Norris (1927–2016), American diplomat
- Christopher Norris, several people
- Chuck Norris, several people
  - Chuck Norris (1940–2026), American actor, media personality, author and martial artist
  - Chuck Norris (musician) (1921–1989), American guitarist
- Clint Norris, American musician and former member of the band As I Lay Dying
- Cornelia Alice Norris (1857–1935), American socialite and genealogist
- Craig Norris, Canadian musician and radio broadcaster
- Daniel Norris (born 1993), American baseball player
- Daran Norris (born 1964), American actor
- David Norris, several people
  - David Norris (footballer) (born 1981), English association football player
  - David Norris (politician) (born 1944), Irish civil rights campaigner and politician
  - David Norris (speedway rider) (born 1972), English speedway rider
- Dean Norris (born 1963), American actor
- Debra Hess Norris, American conservator and academic
- Eric Norris (born 1965), American former race driver and son of Chuck Norris.
- Evelyn Norris (1918–2014), Singaporean educator
- Francis Norris, 1st Earl of Berkshire (1579–1622), English nobleman and courtier
- Frank Norris, several people
  - Frank Norris (1870–1902), American novelist
  - Frank Norris (bishop) (1864–1945), Anglican missionary bishop
  - Frank Norris (footballer) (1869–1934), English association footballer
  - J. Frank Norris (1877–1952), Baptist preacher and Christian fundamentalist
  - Sir Frank Kingsley Norris (1893–1984), Australian military officer and physician
- Fred Norris, several people
  - Fred Norris (born 1955), American radio personality
  - Fred Norris (footballer) (1903–1962), English association footballer
- Frederick Norris (1921–2006), British marathon runner
- Galen Norris (1915–2001), Canadian politician
- George W. Norris (1861–1944), member of the U.S. Congress and Senator from Nebraska
- Henry Norris, several people
- Hermione Norris (born 1966), English actress
- Ina Norris, American actress
- Jacob Norris, several people
- James Norris, several people
  - James Norris (footballer) (born 2003), English football player
  - James D. Norris (1906–1966), American sports businessman and son of James E. Norris
  - James E. Norris (1879–1952), Canadian-American businessman and namesake of the James Norris Memorial Trophy in the National Hockey League
  - James J. Norris (1907–1976), American advocate for refugees and recipient of UNHCR's Nansen Refugee Award
  - Jim Norris (born 1948), American baseball player
- Jared Norris (born 1993), American football player
- Jesse Norris, American powerlifter
- Jill Norris, American retired Chief Information Officer in California
- Joanna Norris, New Zealand journalist
- John Norris, several people
- Josef Norris (born 1965), American artist
- Joshua Norris (born 1999), American ice hockey player for the Ottawa Senators
- Joz Norris (born 1989), British comedian
- Justin Norris (born 1980), Australian swimmer
- Kathleen Norris, several people
  - Kathleen "Kathi" Norris (1919–2005), American writer and television presenter
  - Kathleen Norris (1880–1966), American novelist
  - Kathleen Norris (poet) (born 1947), American poet, essayist and devotional writer
- Kenneth True Norris Jr. (1930–1996), American businessman
- Lando Norris (born 1999), British-Belgian racing driver
- Lee Norris (born 1981), American actor
- Lennie Norris (born 1951), English swimmer
- Leslie Norris (1921–2006), Welsh poet
- Lorna Norris (born 1975), British rower
- Luke Norris (actor) (born 1985), English actor
- Marcus Norris (born 1974), American basketball player
- Marguerite Norris (1927–1994), American ice hockey executive
- Mark Norris (born 1962), Canadian politician and former MLA in the province of Alberta
- Mary Norris, several people
  - Mary Norris (copy editor) (born 1952), American author, writer and copy editor
  - Mary Harriott Norris (1848–1918), American writer and educator
- Matthew Norris, several people
- Michele Norris (born 1961), American radio journalist
- Michelle Norris, first female winner of Military Cross (UK)
- Mike Norris (born 1962) : American actor and eldest son of Chuck Norris.
- Mike Norris (businessman) (born 1961), British businessman
- Mikki Norris (born 1952), American activist
- Misti Norris, American chef
- Moochie Norris (born 1973), American basketball player
- Morice Norris (born 2000), American football player
- Ollie Norris, several people
  - Ollie Norris (born 1993), New Zealand rugby union player
  - Ollie Norris (footballer) (1929–2011), Northern Irish association football player
- Olivia Norris (born 1983), German javelin thrower
- Patrick Norris (born 1976), television director
- Paul Norris (1914–2007), American comic book artist
- Peggy Norris, American physicist
- Philetus Norris (1821–1885), second superintendent of Yellowstone National Park
- R. V. Norris (1864–1928), American mining engineer
- Ralph Norris (born 1949), Australasian business executive
- Rex Norris, several people
- Robert Norris, multiple people
- Roger Norreis (died between 1223 and 1225), Abbot of Evesham, also sometimes known as Roger Norreys or Roger Norris
- Roland Victor Norris (1888–1950), English biochemist
- Ron Norris (1932–1984), Anglo-Indian Olympic boxer
- Roy Norris (1948–2020), one of the two Toolbox Killers
- Septimus Norris (1818–1862), American locomotive designer
- Steven Norris (born 1945), British politician
- Sylvester Norris (1572–1630), English Roman Catholic writer
- Thomas Norris, several people
  - Sir Thomas Norris (1556–1599), British soldier
- Tony Norris (1917–2005), British ornithologist
- William Norris (1719–1791), English clergyman and antiquarian

=== Fictional characters ===
- Arthur Norris, a character in the novel Mr Norris Changes Trains by Christopher Isherwood
- Norris (Chrono Cross), a character in the PlayStation game Chrono Cross
- Norris Cole, a character in Coronation Street, a British TV soap opera
- Mrs. Norris, a character in Jane Austen's Mansfield Park
- Mrs. Norris, the pet cat of Argus Filch in the Harry Potter novels and films
- Norris Packard, a character from the Mobile Suit Gundam: The 08th MS Team OVA

== See also ==
- Norris (given name)
