= Glamorgan County Cricket Club in 2015 =

Glamorgan County Cricket Club
2015 season
- Coach: (Wales) Toby Radford
- Captain: (South Africa) Jacques Rudolph
- Overseas player: (South Africa) Jacques Rudolph
- Ground(s): Sophia Gardens, Cardiff; St Helen's Ground, Swansea; Penrhyn Avenue, Rhos-on-Sea
- County Championship: 4th, Division Two
- One-Day Cup: 8th, Group B
- T20 Blast: 6th, South Group
- Most runs: FC: Jacques Rudolph (962); LA: Colin Ingram (405); T20: Jacques Rudolph (461)
- Most wickets: FC: Michael Hogan (48); LA: Michael Hogan (5); T20: Dean Cosker (17)
- Most catches: FC: Jacques Rudolph (13); LA: Aneurin Donald (2); Dean Cosker (2); Michael Hogan (2); Craig Meschede (2); T20: Jacques Rudolph (9)
- Most wicket-keeping dismissals: FC: Mark Wallace (43 ct + 3 st); LA: Mark Wallace (4 ct + 1 st); T20: Mark Wallace (5 ct + 2 st)

The 2015 season was Glamorgan County Cricket Club's 128th year of existence and its 95th as a first-class cricket county. In 2015, Glamorgan played in the Second Division of the County Championship, Group B of the 50-over One-Day Cup and the South Group of the T20 Blast. It was the second season in charge for head coach Toby Radford. The club captain was overseas player Jacques Rudolph. Unlike other counties, Glamorgan competed in limited-overs cricket without a nickname for the third year in a row.

== Squad ==
- No. denotes the player's squad number, as worn on the back of their shirt.
- ‡ denotes players with international caps.
- * denotes a player who has been awarded a county cap.
- Ages given as of the first day of the County Championship season, 12 April 2015.

No.	Name	Nationality	Birth date	Batting style	Bowling style	Notes
Batsmen
3	James Kettleborough	England	22 October 1992 (aged 22)	Right-handed	Right arm off break	
4	Jacques Rudolph ‡	South Africa	4 May 1981 (aged 33)	Left-handed	Right arm leg break	Overseas player; club captain
6	Jeremy Lawlor	Wales	4 November 1995 (aged 19)	Right-handed	Right arm off break	
12	Aneurin Donald	Wales	20 December 1996 (aged 18)	Right-handed	Right arm off break	
29	Ben Wright*	England	5 December 1987 (aged 27)	Right-handed	Right arm medium-fast	
41	Colin Ingram	South Africa	3 July 1985 (aged 29)	Left-handed	—	Kolpak registration; occasional wicket-keeper
All-rounders
7	Jack Murphy	Wales	15 July 1995 (aged 19)	Left-handed	Left arm fast-medium	
8	Graham Wagg	England	28 April 1983 (aged 31)	Right-handed	Left arm medium	
14	David Lloyd	Wales	15 June 1992 (aged 22)	Right-handed	Right arm off break	
20	Ruaidhri Smith	Scotland	5 August 1994 (aged 20)	Right-handed	Right arm medium	
44	Craig Meschede	South Africa	21 November 1991 (aged 23)	Right-handed	Right arm medium-fast	On loan from Somerset
Wicket-keepers
18	Mark Wallace*	Wales	19 November 1981 (aged 33)	Left-handed	—	
22	Will Bragg	Wales	24 October 1986 (aged 28)	Left-handed	—	
24	Chris Cooke	South Africa	30 May 1986 (aged 28)	Right-handed	—	
Bowlers
11	Kieran Bull	Wales	5 April 1995 (aged 20)	Right-handed	Right arm off break	
21	Andrew Salter	Wales	1 June 1993 (aged 21)	Right-handed	Right arm off break	
23	Dean Cosker*	England	7 January 1978 (aged 37)	Right-handed	Slow left-arm orthodox	
30	Dewi Penrhyn Jones	Wales	9 September 1994 (aged 20)	Right-handed	Right arm fast	
31	Michael Hogan	Australia	31 May 1981 (aged 33)	Right-handed	Right arm fast-medium	
34	Will Owen	Wales	2 September 1988 (aged 26)	Right-handed	Right arm medium-fast	
37	Andy Carter	England	27 August 1988 (aged 26)	Right-handed	Right arm medium	On loan from Nottinghamshire from 9 April to 8 May
—	Wayne Parnell	South Africa	30 July 1989 (aged 25)	Left-handed	Left arm medium-fast	Overseas player; Twenty20 only

== County Championship ==
Team	Pld	W	L	T	D	A	Bat	Bowl	Ded	Pts
Surrey (P)	16	8	1	0	7	0	56	45	0	264
Lancashire (P)	16	7	1	0	8	0	58	44	0	254
Essex	16	6	5	0	5	0	37	42	0	200
Glamorgan	16	4	4	0	8	0	42	37	0	183
Northamptonshire	16	3	3	0	10	0	38	46	2	180
Gloucestershire	16	5	5	0	6	0	31	36	0	177
Kent	16	4	7	0	5	0	28	44	0	161
Derbyshire	16	3	7	0	6	0	34	42	1	153
Leicestershire	16	2	9	0	5	0	36	41	16	118

12–15 April
Scorecard

Glamorgan	v	Leicestershire
513/9d (120 overs); Will Bragg 120 (226); Atif Sheikh 3/108 (18 overs)		435 (120.3 overs); Ned Eckersley 147 (279); Andy Carter 4/95 (26.3 overs)
227/7d (63.5 overs); Chris Cooke 81 (124); Ollie Freckingham 2/47 (14 overs)		141/3 (38 overs); Mark Cosgrove 59* (113); Graham Wagg 1/17 (6 overs)

Match drawn
Grace Road, Leicester
Umpires: Steve Garratt and Martin Saggers

- Glamorgan won the toss and elected to bat.
- Play on day 1 was reduced to 72.3 overs due to rain and bad light.
- Mark Wallace (Glam) passed 10,000 first-class runs when he reached 7 in the second innings.
- Points: Glamorgan 12, Leicestershire 11.

19–22 April
Scorecard

Surrey	v	Glamorgan
563/7d (146 overs); Steven Davies 200* (290); Andy Carter 4/110 (35 overs)		419 (138.2 overs); Craig Meschede 101* (130); Gareth Batty 3/110 (43 overs)
207/4d (37 overs); Kevin Pietersen 53* (70); Graham Wagg 2/46 (10 overs)		116/0 (37 overs); Jacques Rudolph 52* (114)

Match drawn
Sophia Gardens, Cardiff
Umpires: Peter Hartley and David Millns

- Surrey won the toss and elected to bat.
- Points: Surrey 12, Glamorgan 9.

3–6 May
Scorecard

Derbyshire	v	Glamorgan
205 (63.1 overs); Ben Slater 53 (122); Andy Carter 4/53 (19 overs)		103/4d (36.5 overs); Jacques Rudolph 43 (67); Shiv Thakor 2/11 (7 overs)
209/2d (55 overs); Scott Elstone 103* (131); Michael Hogan 1/30 (10 overs)

Match drawn
Sophia Gardens, Cardiff
Umpires: Nigel Cowley and Alex Wharf

- Glamorgan won the toss and elected to field.
- Play on day 1 was reduced to 15.5 overs due to rain.
- Matthew Critchley (Derbs) made his first-class debut.
- Points: Glamorgan 8, Derbyshire 7.

10–13 May
Scorecard

Kent	v	Glamorgan
357 (102 overs); Daniel Bell-Drummond 123 (249); Michael Hogan 5/71 (28 overs)		281 (84 overs); Will Bragg 104 (208); Ivan Thomas 3/40 (17 overs)
327 (83.4 over); Joe Denly 66 (112); Michael Hogan 4/65 (19.4 overs)		309/9 (107 overs); Dean Cosker 69 (183); Calum Haggett 4/61 (23 overs)

Match drawn
St Lawrence Ground, Canterbury
Umpires: Rob Bailey and Nick Cook

- Kent won the toss and elected to bat.
- Points: Kent 12, Glamorgan 10.

18–21 May
Scorecard

Glamorgan	v	Essex
314 (93.3 overs); Jacques Rudolph 82 (222); David Masters 3/51 (29 overs)		221 (61.3 overs); Ryan ten Doeschate 49 (89); Graham Wagg 5/54 (12.3 overs)
270 (55.5 overs); Mark Wallace 79 (87); Adeel Malik 3/39 (9.5 overs)		274 (87.4 overs); Ryan ten Doeschate 74* (118); Andrew Salter 3/54 (27 overs)

Glamorgan won by 89 runs
Sophia Gardens, Cardiff
Umpires: Graham Lloyd and Jeremy Lloyds

- Essex won the toss and elected to field.
- The start of play on day 1 was delayed due to rain.
- Callum Taylor (Essex) made his first-class debut.
- Points: Glamorgan 22, Essex 4.

31 May–3 June
Scorecard

Glamorgan	v	Northamptonshire
371 (71.3 overs); Craig Meschede 107 (109); Rory Kleinveldt 3/91 (19.3 overs)		157 (48 overs); Josh Cobb 54 (99); Andrew Salter 3/5 (4 overs)
57/0 (20.5 overs); Jacques Rudolph 29* (52)		269 (f/o) (84.2 overs); Rob Newton 107 (192); Andrew Salter 3/64 (21 overs)

Glamorgan won by 10 wickets
Sophia Gardens, Cardiff
Umpires: Mike Burns and Richard Illingworth

- Northamptonshire won the toss and elected to field.
- Play on day 1 was reduced to 73 overs due to rain.
- Play on day 2 was reduced to 27 overs due to rain.
- Play on day 3 was reduced to 68 overs due to rain.
- Points: Glamorgan 23, Northamptonshire 3.

15–18 June
Scorecard

Surrey	v	Glamorgan
406 (121.4 overs); Arun Harinath 120 (213); Graham Wagg 4/89 (24.4 overs)		437 (83.2 overs); Graham Wagg 200 (216); Tom Curran 4/153 (24 overs)
277 (80.5 overs); Arun Harinath 104 (156); Michael Hogan 5/44 (21 overs)		247/3 (63.1 overs); Will Bragg 83 (170); Aneesh Kapil 1/13 (2 overs)

Glamorgan won by 7 wickets
Woodbridge Road, Guildford
Umpires: Paul Baldwin and Steve O'Shaughnessy

- Surrey won the toss and elected to bat.
- Points: Glamorgan 23, Surrey 6.

22–25 June
Scorecard

Glamorgan	v	Leicestershire
278 (79 overs); Graham Wagg 94 (113); Clint McKay 3/61 (16 overs)		253 (86.4 overs); Matthew Boyce 50 (141); Michael Hogan 3/54 (16 overs)
298 (87.2 overs); Jacques Rudolph 74 (230); Ben Raine 5/43 (16 overs)		186 (73 overs); Matthew Boyce 60 (148); Graham Wagg 2/15 (12 overs)

Glamorgan won by 137 runs
Sophia Gardens, Cardiff
Umpires: Mark Benson and Russell Evans

- Glamorgan won the toss and elected to bat.
- Points: Glamorgan 21, Leicestershire 5.

6–9 July
Scorecard

Glamorgan	v	Derbyshire
410/8d (79.3 overs); Colin Ingram 89 (113); Mark Footitt 4/98 (25 overs)		252 (86 overs); Billy Godleman 53 (134); Ruaidhri Smith 3/23 (11 overs)
		281/3d (f/o) (90.4 overs); Hamish Rutherford 108 (265); Andrew Salter 2/51 (25 overs)

Match drawn
Queen's Park, Chesterfield
Umpires: Paul Baldwin and Martin Saggers

- Derbyshire won the toss and elected to field.
- Play on day 1 was reduced to 32 overs due to rain.
- Points: Glamorgan 13, Derbyshire 10.

12–15 July
Scorecard

Essex	v	Glamorgan
279 (78.3 overs); Jaik Mickleburgh 50 (86); Michael Hogan 4/36 (19.3 overs)		162 (40.5 overs); Colin Ingram 43 (56); Jesse Ryder 6/47 (15 overs)
344/4d (85 overs); Nick Browne 129 (209); Colin Ingram 3/90 (17 overs)		213 (60.3 overs); Aneurin Donald 67 (121); Jesse Ryder 4/53 (17.3 overs)

Essex won by 248 runs
County Ground, Chelmsford
Umpires: Peter Hartley and C. K. Nandan (Ind)

- Essex won the toss and elected to bat.
- Points: Essex 21, Glamorgan 3.

19–22 July
Scorecard

Lancashire	v	Glamorgan
698/5d (136.4 overs); Alviro Petersen 286 (376); David Lloyd 3/164 (23 overs)		348 (101.2 overs); Michael Hogan 57 (44); Glen Chapple 4/62 (24 overs)
		193 (f/o) (71.4 overs); Chris Cooke 56 (164); Simon Kerrigan 4/28 (21.4 overs)

Lancashire won by an innings and 157 runs
Penrhyn Avenue, Rhos-on-Sea
Umpires: Martin Bodenham and Neil Mallender

- Lancashire won the toss and elected to bat.
- The start of play on day 4 was delayed until 13:00 due to rain.
- Alviro Petersen and Ashwell Prince (Lancs) reached their highest individual first-class totals. Their 501-run partnership for the third wicket is the highest for any wicket both for Lancashire and against Glamorgan, and only the 13th partnership off 500 or more in the history of first-class cricket.
- Points: Lancashire 24, Glamorgan 3.

6–9 August
Scorecard

Glamorgan	v	Gloucestershire
299 (102.4 overs); Andrew Salter 73 (138); David Payne 4/73 (19.4 overs)		416 (117.1 overs); Hamish Marshall 70 (106); Craig Meschede 4/89 (25 overs)
224 (62.5 overs); Colin Ingram 45 (73); David Payne 4/50 (15 overs)		108/3 (36.5 overs); Chris Dent 65* (119); Graham Wagg 2/8 (6 overs)

Gloucestershire won by 7 wickets
St Helen's Ground, Swansea
Umpires: Neil Bainton and David Millns

- Glamorgan won the toss and elected to bat.
- Points: Gloucestershire 23, Glamorgan 4.

21–24 August
Scorecard

Lancashire	v	Glamorgan
462 (140.1 overs); Karl Brown 132 (292); Craig Meschede 4/101 (24 overs)		213 (79.4 overs); Andrew Salter 45 (105); Simon Kerrigan 4/60 (24.4 overs)
159/3 (f/o) (82 overs); Jacques Rudolph 63 (206); Steven Croft 1/3 (6 overs)

Match drawn
Old Trafford, Manchester
Umpires: Rob Bailey and Richard Illingworth

- Lancashire won the toss and elected to bat.
- Haseeb Hameed (Lancs) made his first-class debut.
- Points: Lancashire 11, Glamorgan 7.

9–12 September
Scorecard

Kent	v	Glamorgan
309 (78.3 overs); Rob Key 94 (150); Michael Hogan 4/51 (20 overs)		207 (43.5 overs); Graham Wagg 58 (59); Adam Riley 4/47 (7.5 overs)
451/2d (102 overs); Joe Denly 161* (220); Graham Wagg 1/89 (21 overs)		237 (62.3 overs); Colin Ingram 105* (179); Darren Stevens 5/58 (22 overs)

Kent won by 316 runs
Sophia Gardens, Cardiff
Umpires: Martin Bodenham and Alex Wharf

- Kent won the toss and elected to bat.
- Points: Kent 22, Glamorgan 4.

14–17 September
Scorecard

Glamorgan	v	Northamptonshire
233 (52.2 overs); David Lloyd 92 (106); Rory Kleinveldt 5/83 (20 overs)		278 (64.4 overs); Adam Rossington 59 (65); Graham Wagg 4/77 (18.4 overs)
99/3d (26 overs); Aneurin Donald 40 (50); Richard Gleeson 2/35 (7 overs)

Match drawn
County Ground, Northampton
Umpires: Neil Bainton and Stephen Gale

- Northamptonshire won the toss and elected to field.
- Rain on Day 1 meant only 6 overs were possible.
- Rain on Day 2 meant only 31 overs were possible.
- Dewi Penrhyn Jones (Glam) made his first-class debut.
- Points: Northamptonshire 10, Glamorgan 9.

22–25 September
Scorecard

Glamorgan	v	Gloucestershire
433 (99.3 overs); Aneurin Donald 98 (135); James Fuller 4/59 (21 overs)		558 (121.5 overs); Chris Dent 268 (347); Michael Hogan 3/82 (29 overs)
365/3d (102 overs); Chris Cooke 102* (135); David Payne 1/32 (16 overs)

Match drawn
County Ground, Bristol
Umpires: Paul Baldwin and Nigel Cowley

- Glamorgan won the toss and elected to bat.
- Rain and a wet outfield meant only 77 overs were possible on Day 1.
- Points: Gloucestershire 13, Glamorgan 12.

== One-Day Cup ==
Pos	Team	Pld	W	L	T	NR	Ded	Pts	NRR
1	Nottinghamshire Outlaws	8	5	1	0	2	0	12	0.755
2	Essex Eagles	8	4	2	0	2	0	10	0.480
3	Hampshire	8	3	3	0	2	0	9 (Note: The match between Glamorgan and Hampshire was abandoned due to a dangerous pitch (the match was recorded as a 'no result', but Hampshire were awarded 2 points and Glamorgan were docked 2 points).)	0.554
4	Kent Spitfires	8	3	3	0	2	0	8	0.031
5	Lancashire Lightning	8	3	3	0	2	0	8	−0.034
6	Warwickshire Bears	8	3	3	0	2	0	8	−0.765
7	Middlesex	8	3	4	0	1	0	7	−0.224
8	Glamorgan	8	2	2	0	4	4	3 (Note: Glamorgan were docked 2 points before the start of season after preparing an unfit pitch in 2014.)	0.160
9	Sussex Sharks	8	0	5	0	3	0	3	−1.063

Notes:

26 July 2015
Scorecard

Nottinghamshire; 83/3 (23 overs)	v	Glamorgan
Brendan Taylor 40* (54); Ruaidhri Smith 2/12 (6 overs)

No result
Welbeck Colliery Cricket Club Ground, Market Warsop
Umpires: Ben Debenham and Peter Hartley

- Glamorgan won the toss and elected to field.
- The Nottinghamshire innings was reduced to 23 overs due to rain. No play was possible in the Glamorgan innings.
- Aneurin Donald (Glam) made his List A debut.
- Points: Nottinghamshire 1, Glamorgan −1.
- Glamorgan deducted two points for poor pitch against Durham in 2014.

28 July 2015
Scorecard

Kent; 317/7 (50 overs)	v	Glamorgan; 321/7 (49.4 overs)
Darren Stevens 110 (64); Dean Cosker 2/50 (10 overs)		Colin Ingram 109 (106); Matt Coles 3/53 (9 overs)

Glamorgan won by 3 wickets
Sophia Gardens, Cardiff
Umpires: Michael Gough and Peter Hartley
Player of the match: Chris Cooke (Glam)

- Glamorgan won the toss and elected to field.
- The Glamorgan innings was interrupted by rain after 42.2 overs.
- Points: Glamorgan 2, Kent 0.

31 July 2015
Scorecard

Glamorgan; 288/6 (50 overs)	v	Essex; 142 (37.1 overs)
Colin Ingram 130 (144); Reece Topley 3/51 (10 overs)		Ryan ten Doeschate 47 (56); Graham Wagg 2/17 (6 overs)

Glamorgan won by 146 runs
Sophia Gardens, Cardiff
Umpires: Paul Baldwin and Billy Taylor

- Essex won the toss and elected to field.
- Points: Glamorgan 2, Essex 0.

2 August 2015
Scorecard

Glamorgan; 182/9 (50 overs)	v	Hampshire; 26/0 (6.4 overs)
Colin Ingram 51 (86); Liam Dawson 3/21 (10 overs)		Jimmy Adams 13* (17)

No result
Sophia Gardens, Cardiff
Umpires: Paul Baldwin and Neil Mallender

- Glamorgan won the toss and elected to bat.
- The match was abandoned after 6.4 overs of the Hampshire innings due to inconsistent bounce in the wicket.
- Points: Hampshire 2, Glamorgan −2.
- The ECB awarded the match to Hampshire and deducted a further two points from Glamorgan. Glamorgan were also fined £9,000, of which £5,000 was suspended until 2016.

3 August 2015
Scorecard

Glamorgan; 179 (48.4 overs)	v	Warwickshire; 183/1 (38.1 overs)
Will Bragg 45 (77); Oliver Hannon-Dalby 5/27 (8.4 overs)		Varun Chopra 80* (104); Michael Hogan 1/19 (7 overs)

Warwickshire won by 9 wickets
Sophia Gardens, Cardiff
Umpires: Paul Baldwin and Neil Mallender

- Glamorgan won the toss and elected to bat.
- Points: Warwickshire 2, Glamorgan 0.

5 August 2015
Scorecard

Glamorgan; 9/0 (6 overs)	v	Sussex
Will Bragg 7* (10)

No result
St Helen's Ground, Swansea
Umpires: Neil Bainton and David Millns

- Sussex won the toss and elected to field.
- Rain stopped play after 6 overs of the Glamorgan innings.
- Points: Glamorgan 1, Sussex 1.

17 August 2015
Scorecard

Glamorgan; 251/9 (50 overs)	v	Middlesex; 255/2 (39.4 overs)
Colin Ingram 102 (93); James Harris 4/38 (10 overs)		Dawid Malan 156* (128); Kieran Bull 1/40 (8 overs)

Middlesex won by 8 wickets
Lord's, London
Umpires: Russell Evans and Martin Saggers

- Glamorgan won the toss and elected to bat.
- Kieran Bull (Glam) made his List A debut.
- Points: Middlesex 2, Glamorgan 0.

19 August 2015
Scorecard

Lancashire; 68/0 (8.4 overs)	v	Glamorgan
Ashwell Prince 38* (26)

No result
Old Trafford, Manchester
Umpires: Stephen Gale and Steve O'Shaughnessy

- Glamorgan won the toss and elected to field.
- Rain reduced the Lancashire innings to 8.4 overs.
- Points: Lancashire 1, Glamorgan 1.

== T20 Blast ==
Pos	Team	Pld	W	L	T	NR	Ded	Pts	NRR
1	Kent Spitfires	14	9	4	0	1	0	19	0.166
2	Sussex Sharks	14	7	5	0	2	0	16	0.206
3	Hampshire	14	8	6	0	0	0	16	−0.120
4	Essex Eagles	14	7	6	0	1	0	15	0.208
5	Gloucestershire	14	7	7	0	0	0	14	0.354
6	Glamorgan	14	7	7	0	0	0	14	−0.522
7	Surrey	14	5	6	0	3	0	13	−0.145
8	Somerset	14	4	8	0	2	0	10	−0.184
9	Middlesex	14	4	9	0	1	0	9	0.030

15 May 2015
Scorecard

Glamorgan; 240/3 (20 overs)	v	Surrey; 215 (19.3 overs)
Colin Ingram 91 (47); Aneesh Kapil 1/4 (1 over)		Zafar Ansari 67* (32); Dean Cosker 4/30 (4 overs)

Glamorgan won by 25 runs
The Oval, London
Umpires: Mark Benson and Steve O'Shaughnessy
Player of the match: Colin Ingram (Glam)

- Surrey won the toss and elected to field.
- Points: Glamorgan 2, Surrey 0.

22 May 2015
Scorecard

Glamorgan; 144/8 (20 overs)	v	Essex; 145/5 (17.4 overs)
Chris Cooke 31 (30); Shaun Tait 3/28 (4 overs)		Ravi Bopara 81* (53); Michael Hogan 2/19 (4 overs)

Essex won by 5 wickets
Sophia Gardens, Cardiff
Umpires: Graham Lloyd and Jeremy Lloyds
Player of the match: Ravi Bopara (Essex)

- Essex won the toss and elected to field.
- Points: Essex 2, Glamorgan 0.

29 May 2015
Scorecard

Hampshire; 148/8 (20 overs)	v	Glamorgan; 127/8 (20 overs)
Sean Ervine 49 (35); Graham Wagg 4/27 (4 overs)		Jacques Rudolph 38 (34); Chris Wood 4/16 (4 overs)

Hampshire won by 21 runs
Sophia Gardens, Cardiff
Umpires: Jeff Evans and David Millns
Player of the match: Graham Wagg (Glam)

- Glamorgan won the toss and elected to field.
- Points: Hampshire 2, Glamorgan 0.

5 June 2015
Scorecard

Glamorgan; 169/5 (20 overs)	v	Middlesex; 165/5 (20 overs)
Jacques Rudolph 60 (43); Neil Dexter 2/22 (4 overs)		Dawid Malan 70 (54); Craig Meschede 2/14 (2 overs)

Glamorgan won by 4 runs
Sophia Gardens, Cardiff
Umpires: Jeff Evans and Tim Robinson
Player of the match: Craig Meschede (Glam)

- Glamorgan won the toss and elected to bat.
- Points: Glamorgan 2, Middlesex 0.

12 June 2015
Scorecard

Glamorgan; 191/3 (20 overs)	v	Gloucestershire; 172/6 (20 overs)
Jacques Rudolph 101* (71); Benny Howell 2/24 (4 overs)		Michael Klinger 104* (63); Michael Hogan 2/24 (4 overs)

Glamorgan won by 19 runs
County Ground, Bristol
Umpires: Stephen Gale and Alex Wharf
Player of the match: Jacques Rudolph (Glam)

- Gloucestershire won the toss and elected to field.
- Points: Glamorgan 2, Gloucestershire 0.

13 June 2015
Scorecard

Glamorgan; 159/5 (20 overs)	v	Somerset; 43/1 (6 overs)
Tom Cooper 84* (40); Wayne Parnell 2/16 (4 overs)		Craig Meschede 18 (8); Sohail Tanvir 1/4 (2 overs)

Glamorgan won by 2 runs (D/L method)
Sophia Gardens, Cardiff
Umpires: Neil Mallender and David Millns
Player of the match: Tom Cooper (Somst)

- Glamorgan won the toss and elected to field.
- Rain reduced the Glamorgan innings to 6 overs, with a target of 42 runs.
- Points: Glamorgan 2, Somerset 0.

19 June 2015
Scorecard

Essex; 187/7 (20 overs)	v	Glamorgan; 171 (19.4 overs)
Ravi Bopara 52 (40); Michael Hogan 3/33 (4 overs)		Colin Ingram 70 (46); Ravi Bopara 3/25 (4 overs)

Essex won by 16 runs
County Ground, Chelmsford
Umpires: Neil Bainton and Alex Wharf
Player of the match: Ravi Bopara (Essex)

- Glamorgan won the toss and elected to field.
- Points: Essex 2, Glamorgan 0.

21 June 2015
Scorecard

Glamorgan; 115/9 (20 overs)	v	Sussex; 116/0 (12.2 overs)
Chris Cooke 45 (42); Ollie Robinson 3/16 (4 overs)		Luke Wright 57* (36)

Sussex won by 10 wickets
Sophia Gardens, Cardiff
Umpires: Mark Benson and Russell Evans
Player of the match: Ollie Robinson (Sssx)

- Sussex won the toss and elected to field.
- Points: Sussex 2, Glamorgan 0.

26 June 2015
Scorecard

Surrey; 146/8 (20 overs)	v	Glamorgan; 127 (19.3 overs)
Jason Roy 61 (47); Dean Cosker 4/25 (4 overs)		Craig Meschede 31 (27); Azhar Mahmood 3/14 (4 overs)

Surrey won by 19 runs
Sophia Gardens, Cardiff
Umpires: Martin Bodenham and Jeff Evans
Player of the match: Jason Roy (Surrey)

- Glamorgan won the toss and elected to field.
- Points: Surrey 2, Glamorgan 0.

28 June 2015
Scorecard

Glamorgan; 170/4 (20 overs)	v	Somerset; 167/8 (20 overs)
Colin Ingram 96 (62); Jim Allenby 1/18 (2 overs)		Peter Trego 39 (31); Wayne Parnell 2/33 (4 overs)

Glamorgan won by 3 runs
County Ground, Taunton
Umpires: Martin Bodenham and Jeff Evans
Player of the match: Colin Ingram (Glam)

- Somerset won the toss and elected to field.
- Points: Glamorgan 2, Somerset 0.

3 July 2015
Scorecard

Glamorgan; 181/7 (20 overs)	v	Hampshire; 158/6 (20 overs)
Jacques Rudolph 77 (45); Gareth Berg 3/34 (4 overs)		Michael Carberry 70 (46); Jacques Rudolph 2/8 (2 overs)

Glamorgan won by 23 runs
Rose Bowl, Southampton
Umpires: Rob Bailey and Steve Garratt
Player of the match: Jacques Rudolph (Glam)

- Glamorgan won the toss and elected to bat.
- Points: Glamorgan 2, Hampshire 0.

10 July 2015
Scorecard

Glamorgan; 164/7 (20 overs)	v	Sussex; 165/2 (14.5 overs)
Ben Wright 63* (46); Tymal Mills 3/34 (4 overs)		Luke Wright 92* (46); Graham Wagg 2/32 (3 overs)

Sussex won by 8 wickets
County Ground, Hove
Umpires: Ian Blackwell and Jeremy Lloyds
Player of the match: Luke Wright (Sssx)

- Glamorgan won the toss and elected to bat.
- Aneurin Donald (Glam) made his Twenty20 debut.
- Points: Sussex 2, Glamorgan 0.

17 July 2015
Scorecard

Glamorgan; 179/7 (20 overs)	v	Kent; 178/8 (20 overs)
Graham Wagg 54* (24); Matt Hunn 3/33 (4 overs)		Joe Denly 70 (36); Michael Hogan 3/40 (4 overs)

Glamorgan won by 1 run
Nevill Ground, Royal Tunbridge Wells
Umpires: Nick Cook and Paul Pollard

- Glamorgan won the toss and elected to bat.
- Matt Hunn (Kent) made his Twenty20 debut.
- Points: Glamorgan 2, Kent 0.

24 July 2015
Scorecard

Glamorgan; 45/1 (5 overs)	v	Gloucestershire; 51/2 (3.5 overs)
Colin Ingram 18 (8); Kieran Noema-Barnett 1/15 (1 over)		Chris Dent 28* (11); David Lloyd 2/13 (1 over)

Gloucestershire won by 8 wickets
Sophia Gardens, Cardiff
Umpires: Jeff Evans and Russell Evans

- Gloucestershire won the toss and elected to field.

== Pre-season friendlies ==
17–18 March
Scorecard

Glamorgan	v	Gloucestershire
202 (53.5 overs); Mark Wallace 56* (43); James Fuller 4/45 (12 overs)		311/9d (82 overs); Hamish Marshall 104 (169); Will Owen 2/41 (15 overs)
129/1 (33 overs); Will Bragg 60 (92); Matt Taylor 1/19 (6 overs)

Match drawn
Sophia Gardens, Cardiff
Umpires: S Green and Lyn Hall

- Glamorgan won the toss and elected to bat.
- Both sides were able to name up to 13 players in their squads, 11 batting and 11 fielding.

19 March
Scorecard

Glamorgan; 287/8 (50 overs)	v	Gloucestershire; 288/6 (43.3 overs)
Chris Cooke 74 (90); Jack Taylor 3/38 (10 overs)		Jack Taylor 41* (36); Jack Murphy 2/34 (7 overs)

Gloucestershire won by 4 wickets
County Ground, Bristol
Umpires: Bob Hampshire and John Wheeler

- Glamorgan won the toss and elected to bat.
- Both sides were able to name up to 12 players in their squads, 11 batting and 11 fielding.

23–24 March
Scorecard

Glamorgan	v	Somerset
130 (54 overs); David Lloyd 34 (44); Jack Leach 3/9 (6 overs)		314/7d (77 overs); Peter Trego 94 (76); Dewi Penrhyn Jones 2/38 (14.4 overs)
130/2 (32.1 overs); Ben Wright 74* (83); Jamie Overton 1/12 (6.1 overs)

Match drawn
Taunton Vale, Taunton
Umpires: Bernard Critchley and Terry Sterland

- Glamorgan won the toss and elected to bat.
- Both sides were able to name up to 12 players in their squads, 11 batting and 11 fielding.

26 March
Scorecard

Glamorgan; 247 (49.3 overs)	v	Cardiff MCCU; 200/6 (50 overs)
Mark Wallace 64 (77); Jack Murphy 4/46 (9 overs)		Neil Brand 57 (98); Dean Cosker 2/30 (10 overs)

Glamorgan won by 47 runs
Sophia Gardens, Cardiff
Umpires: Mike Harries and Alex Wharf

- Cardiff MCCU won the toss and elected to field.
- Both sides were able to name up to 12 players in their squads, 11 batting and 11 fielding.

2–4 April
Scorecard

Glamorgan	v	Cardiff MCCU
434/7d (124 overs); Chris Cooke 112 (145); Jack Murphy 2/90 (28 overs)		110/8d (43.5 overs); Neil Brand 46 (101); Craig Meschede 3/18 (9 overs)

Match drawn
Sophia Gardens, Cardiff
Umpires: Jeff Evans and Russell Warren

- Cardiff MCCU won the toss and elected to field.
- No play was possible on day 1 due to rain.
- Neil Brand, Jeremy Lawlor, Dan Lewis-Williams, Jack Murphy, Matthew Norris and Tim Rouse (all Cardiff MCCU) made their first-class debuts.

== Statistics ==
=== Batting ===
First-class
Player	Matches	Innings	NO	Runs	HS	Ave	SR	100	50	0	4s	6s
Jacques Rudolph	15	27	2	962	111	38.48	45.46	1	7	0	134	0
Colin Ingram	16	28	3	931	105*	37.24	58.40	2	4	3	144	6
Chris Cooke	16	28	5	884	112	38.43	54.50	2	5	3	112	3
Graham Wagg	17	24	0	842	200	35.08	70.75	1	4	3	100	30
Will Bragg	14	24	1	659	120	28.65	47.20	2	2	3	75	0
Craig Meschede	17	24	3	655	107	31.19	72.21	2	2	2	100	11
David Lloyd	13	20	6	589	92	42.07	70.28	0	3	0	90	3
Mark Wallace	16	24	2	522	92	23.72	58.06	0	3	1	69	1
James Kettleborough	9	16	1	413	81	27.53	47.14	0	3	0	63	0
Andrew Salter	12	19	2	411	73	24.17	48.23	0	2	2	50	6

List A
Player	Matches	Innings	NO	Runs	HS	Ave	SR	100	50	0	4s	6s
Colin Ingram	8	5	0	405	130	81.00	89.60	3	1	0	36	7
Chris Cooke	8	5	1	173	94*	43.25	100.58	0	1	0	17	4
Will Bragg	8	6	1	113	59	22.60	58.24	0	1	2	11	0
Graham Wagg	5	3	1	109	62*	54.50	89.34	0	1	0	9	3
Jacques Rudolph	8	6	1	90	58	18.00	46.63	0	1	1	9	0
David Lloyd	8	5	1	69	33	17.25	86.25	0	0	0	7	1
Aneurin Donald	5	3	0	57	37	19.00	77.02	0	0	0	5	2
Craig Meschede	7	5	0	44	23	8.80	77.19	0	0	1	6	0
James Kettleborough	2	1	0	25	25	25.00	75.75	0	0	0	2	0
Michael Hogan	6	2	2	22	16*	—	78.57	0	0	0	0	1

Twenty20
Player	Matches	Innings	NO	Runs	HS	Ave	SR	100	50	0	4s	6s
Jacques Rudolph	14	13	2	461	101*	41.90	127.34	1	3	1	61	4
Colin Ingram	14	14	1	376	96	28.92	149.80	0	3	1	35	19
Chris Cooke	13	12	3	259	46*	28.77	137.76	0	0	0	13	13
Graham Wagg	13	11	5	209	53*	34.83	122.94	0	1	1	17	9
Craig Meschede	14	13	2	175	35*	15.90	143.44	0	0	4	13	11
Mark Wallace	14	9	0	127	37	14.11	99.21	0	0	0	12	1
Ben Wright	12	8	2	116	63*	19.33	118.36	0	1	2	13	2
Wayne Parnell	8	5	1	66	32	16.50	106.45	0	0	1	4	1
David Lloyd	8	5	0	50	18	10.00	111.11	0	0	0	5	0
Andrew Salter	11	7	3	29	17*	7.25	107.40	0	0	1	2	0

=== Bowling ===
First-class
Player	Matches	Innings	Overs	Maidens	Runs	Wickets	BBI	BBM	Ave	Econ	SR	5w	10w
Michael Hogan	14	24	482.1	126	1297	48	5/44	9/136	27.02	2.68	60.2	2	0
Graham Wagg	17	29	467.4	73	1681	45	5/54	7/135	37.35	3.59	62.3	1	0
Craig Meschede	17	29	438.3	69	1609	43	4/89	5/126	37.41	3.66	61.1	0	0
Andrew Salter	12	20	339.1	42	1150	25	3/5	6/69	46.00	3.39	81.4	0	0
David Lloyd	13	18	215.2	23	942	21	3/68	3/109	44.85	4.37	61.5	0	0
Andy Carter	4	8	121.1	23	373	16	4/53	4/48	23.31	3.07	45.4	0	0
Colin Ingram	16	15	103.3	9	398	10	3/90	4/107	39.80	3.84	62.1	0	0
Dean Cosker	6	10	175.5	20	651	8	2/14	2/14	81.37	3.70	131.8	0	0
Ruaidhri Smith	3	5	42.0	5	155	6	3/23	3/57	25.83	3.69	42.0	0	0
Dewi Penrhyn Jones	2	2	32.0	1	190	5	3/55	3/55	38.00	5.93	38.4	0	0

List A
Player	Matches	Innings	Overs	Maidens	Runs	Wickets	BBI	Ave	Econ	SR	4w	5w
Michael Hogan	6	5	34.4	5	140	5	2/60	28.00	4.03	41.6	0	0
Ruaidhri Smith	4	4	24.0	0	138	4	2/12	34.50	5.75	36.0	0	0
Dean Cosker	6	3	26.1	1	139	4	2/37	34.75	5.31	39.2	0	0
Craig Meschede	7	5	29.0	2	156	3	2/23	52.00	5.37	58.0	0	0
Colin Ingram	8	3	11.0	0	62	2	2/23	31.00	5.63	33.0	0	0
Graham Wagg	5	4	16.0	2	68	2	2/17	34.00	4.25	48.0	0	0
Kieran Bull	2	2	8.4	0	48	1	1/40	48.00	5.53	52.0	0	0
Dewi Penrhyn Jones	2	2	7.4	0	88	1	1/73	88.00	11.47	46.0	0	0
David Lloyd	8	6	27.1	1	148	1	1/16	148.00	5.44	163.0	0	0
Jacques Rudolph	8	1	1.0	0	8	0	—	—	8.00	—	0	0

Twenty20
Player	Matches	Innings	Overs	Maidens	Runs	Wickets	BBI	Ave	Econ	SR	4w	5w
Dean Cosker	14	14	46.5	0	374	17	4/25	22.00	7.98	16.5	2	0
Michael Hogan	14	14	46.2	1	365	15	3/33	24.33	7.87	18.5	0	0
Graham Wagg	13	11	41.0	0	400	13	4/27	30.76	9.75	18.9	1	0
Wayne Parnell	8	8	28.0	0	207	8	2/16	25.87	7.39	21.0	0	0
Craig Meschede	14	13	30.0	0	300	8	2/14	37.50	10.00	22.5	0	0
Andrew Salter	11	8	25.0	0	237	7	2/43	33.85	9.48	21.4	0	0
David Lloyd	8	3	4.0	0	44	3	2/13	14.66	11.00	8.0	0	0
Colin Ingram	14	6	15.2	0	106	3	2/20	35.33	6.91	30.6	0	0
Jacques Rudolph	14	5	9.0	0	70	2	2/8	35.00	7.77	27.0	0	0
Ruaidhri Smith	2	2	2.4	0	35	1	1/11	35.00	13.12	16.0	0	0
