= Norris =

Norris or Noris may refer to:

== Places ==
=== In Canada ===
- Norris, Ontario, in Algoma District

=== In the United Kingdom ===
- Hampstead Norreys (or Norris), Berkshire

=== In the United States ===
- Norris, Illinois
- Norris, Mississippi
- Norris, Missouri
- Norris, Nebraska
- Norris, South Carolina
- Norris, Tennessee, named after George William Norris
- Norris Dam, which forms Norris Lake, Tennessee
- Norris Geyser Basin in Yellowstone National Park
- Norristown, Pennsylvania
- Lake Norris, Florida

=== In Germany ===
- Norisring, street circuit in Nuremberg

== Companies ==
- Norris Locomotive Works
- Norisbank, a bank in Germany
- T. Norris & Son, London, hand-tool makers

== Buildings ==
- Norris House, Palo Alto, California, U.S.
- Norris-Heartt House, Raleigh, North Carolina, U.S.
- Norris-Holland-Hare House, Holly Springs, North Carolina, U.S.

== Other ==
- Norris (given name)
- Norris (surname)
- List of storms named Norris, list of tropical cyclones assigned with the name Norris
- Noris (pencil), a popular brand of Staedtler pencil

== See also ==
- Norreys
