= Alex Norris =

Alex Norris may refer to:

- Alex Norris (British politician) (born 1984)
- Alex Norris (Canadian politician)
- Alex Norris (cartoonist), Welsh cartoonist

== See also ==
- Norris (surname)
- Norris (disambiguation)
