= Wind power in Nebraska =

Electricity from wind in one U.S. state

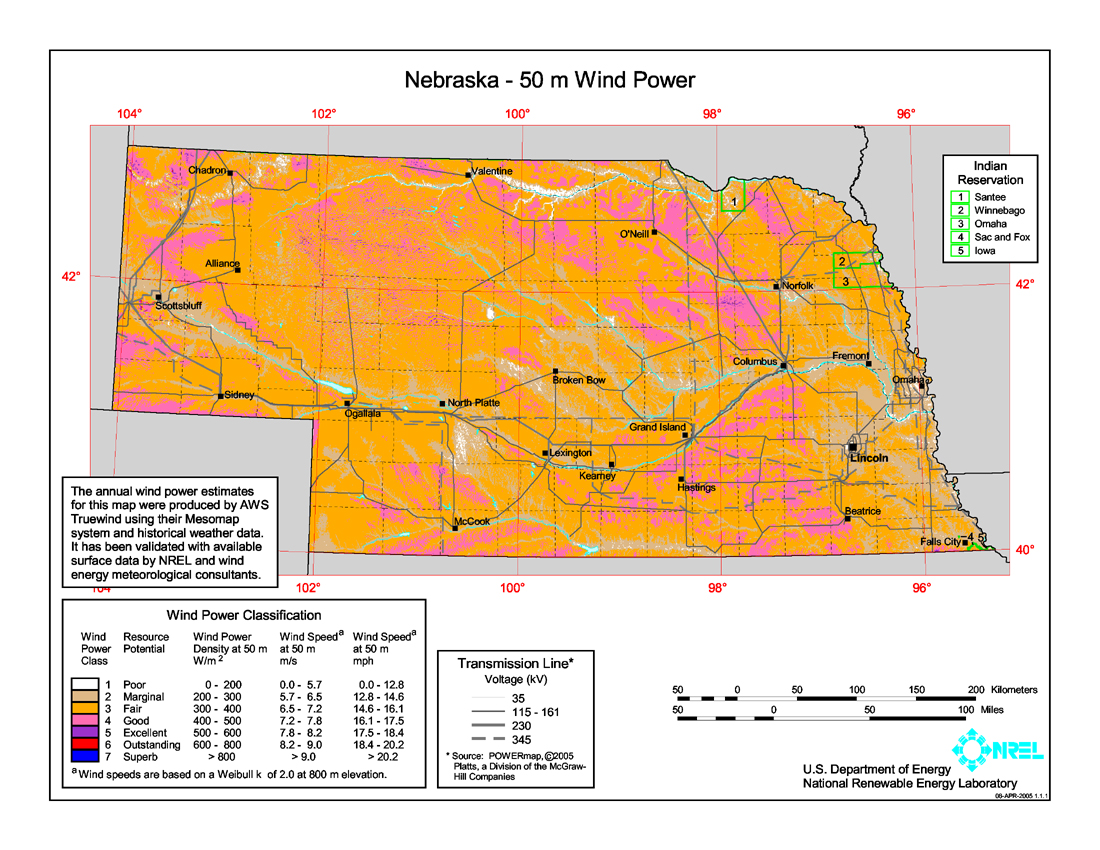
2006 United States Department of Energy National Renewable Energy Laboratory NE wind resource map

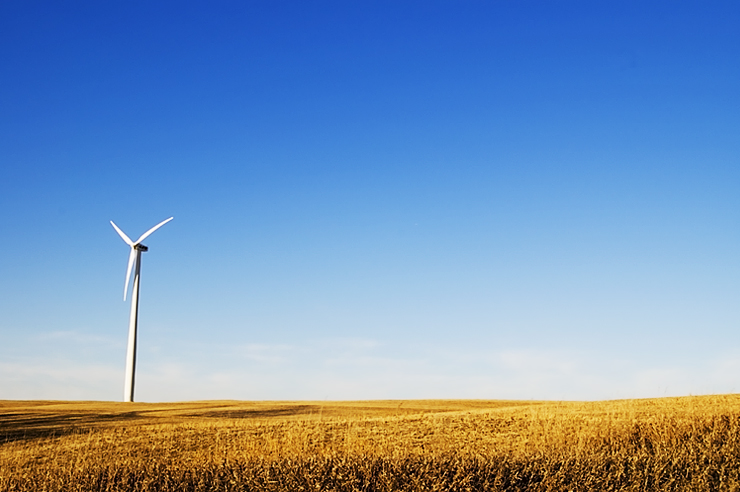
Salt Valley, near Lincoln, 2006

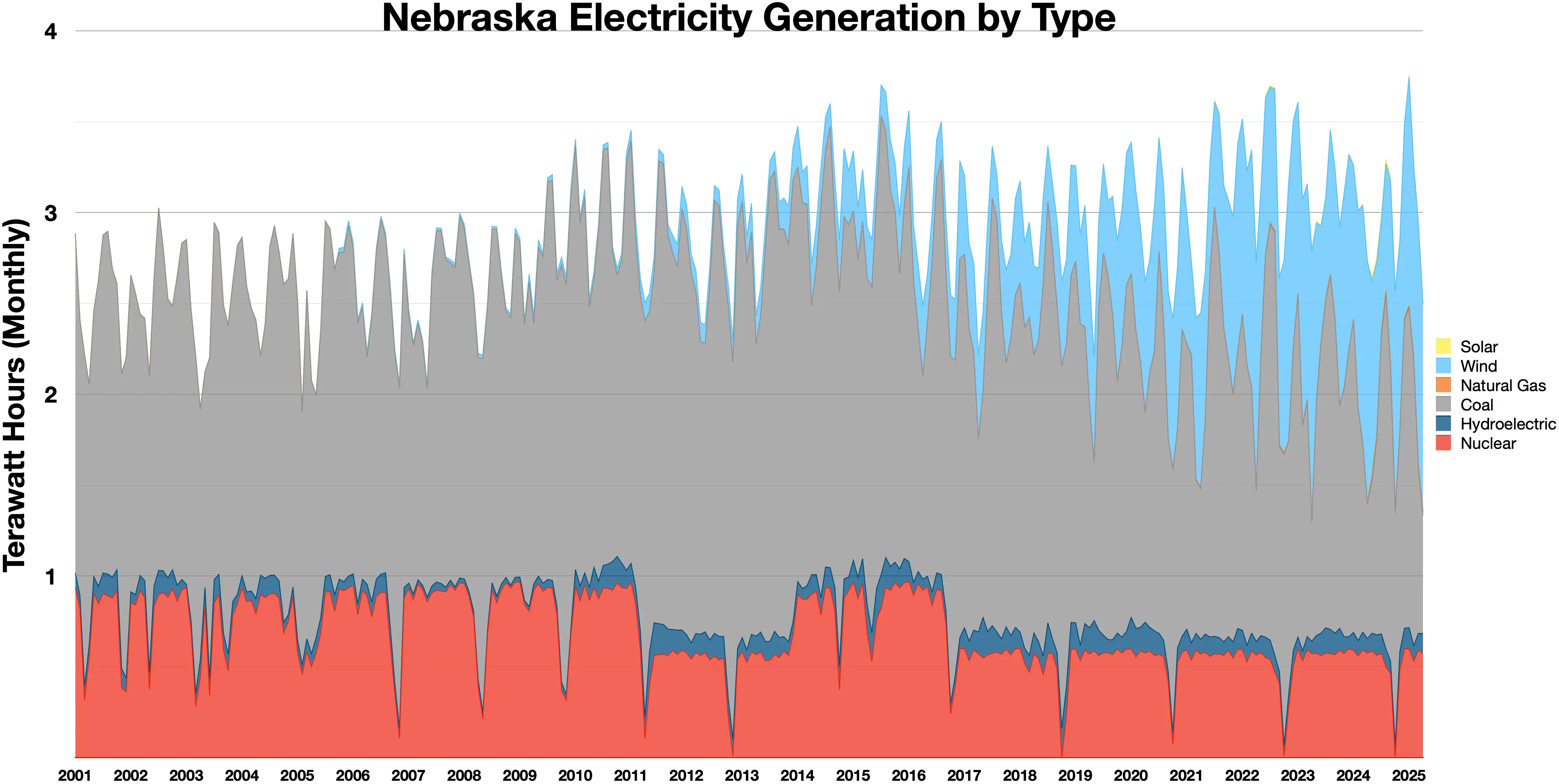
Nebraska electricity generation by type

Wind power in Nebraska remains largely untapped in comparison with its potential. In the Great Plains, with more than 47,000 farms and open skies it ranks near the top in the United States in its ability to generate energy from wind. As of 2015, the state had not adopted a renewable portfolio standard. Omaha Public Power District (OPPD) is one of the state's largest purchasers of wind energy.

In 2016, Nebraska had 1,335 MW of installed wind power generation capacity, producing 10.1% of the electricity generated in-state. This increased to a capacity of 2,142 MW and a 19.92% of generation in 2019.

== Wind for Schools ==
An initiative of the Department of Energy, the Wind for Schools program supported the construction of small scale wind turbines at schools throughout the state, to encourage the incorporation of renewable energy education into the science curriculum. In Nebraska, wind turbines were installed at 25 K-12 schools, four community colleges, and the Wind Applications Center at the University of Nebraska–Lincoln. Locations include various elementary and high schools, and community colleges including those in Bancroft, Bloomfield, Cedar Rapids, Crawford, Creighton, Diller-Odell High School, Elkhorn Valley, Hastings, Hayes Center, Hyannis, Logan View, Loup City, Merdian-Daykin, Mullen, Norfolk, Norris, Oshkosh, Pleasanton, Superior, West Holt and Southeast Community College.

== Utility installations ==
Nebraska's first utility-scale wind project with two 750 kW Zond wind turbines came on-line in 1998 west of Springview and operated until 2007.

Site	Location	Coordinates	Commissioned	Size (MW)	Turbines: number, type and model	Notes
OPPD/Valmont Industries	Douglas, Otoe County	40.593056°N 96.387222°W	2001	0.7	2 Vestas V47	Valmont prototype Omaha Public Power District
Kimball Wind Project	near Kimball, Kimball County		2002	30		MEAN
Ainsworth Wind Energy	near Ainsworth, Brown		2005	59.4	Vestas V82	Renewable Energy Systems
Elkhorn Ridge Wind Farm	Knox		2009	81.0	Vestas V90-3.0	
Flat Water Wind Farm	near Humboldt, Richardson		2010	60.0	GE 1.5	Renewable Energy Systems
Laredo Ridge Wind Farm	Petersburg, Boone		2010	80.0	GE 1.5 xle	
Springview II	near Springview, Keya Paha		2011	3.0	Vensys 77	direct-drive turbine
TPE Petersburg Wind Farm	near Petersburg, Boone		2011	40.5	GE1.5 xle-ess	
Broken Bow Wind Farm 1	Broken Bow, Custer	41.400029°N 99.573412°W	2012	80.0	GE 1.5sle	
Broken Bow Wind Farm 2	Broken Bow, Custer		2012	80.0	50 GE Energy 1.5sle	Sempra & Con Ed
Crofton Bluffs Wind Farm	Crofton, Knox		2012	42.0	Vestas V90	
Steele Flats Wind Farm	Steele City and Odell; Jefferson & Gage		2014	75.0		
Prairie Breeze Wind Farm	Antelope Boone, & Madison		2014	200.6		Invenergy
Prairie Breeze II, III	Antelope and Boone counties		2015	109.2		Invenergy
Grande Prairie Wind Farm	O'Neill, Holt	42.608056°N 98.428333°W	2016	400	200 Vestas V110-2.0	BHE Renewables
Cottonwood Wind	Webster	40.240168°N 98.405956°W	2017	90	Siemans VS 2.3	
Kimball Wind Farm	Kimball		2018	30	GE	
Upstream			2018	202	GE	
Rattlesnake Creek	Dixon		2018	318	Nordex	
Seward Wind Project	Seward	40.895297°N 97.195383°W	2018	1.7	GE 1.7 MW	Bluestem Energy Solutions

== Statistics ==
Nebraska wind generation capacity by year
Megawatts of wind capacity

Nebraska wind generation by year
Million kilowatt-hours of electricity

Nebraska wind generation (GWh, million kWh)
Year	Total	Jan	Feb	Mar	Apr	May	Jun	Jul	Aug	Sep	Oct	Nov	Dec
2002	11	1	1	0	1	1	1	1	1	1	1	1	1
2003	40	4	3	3	3	3	3	4	4	3	3	3	4
2004	36	3	3	3	3	3	3	3	3	3	3	3	3
2005	98	1	2	3	3	3	3	2	2	3	23	27	26
2006	260	28	21	23	25	22	16	19	18	18	22	23	25
2007	217	31	15	22	18	17	17	15	12	14	18	20	18
2008	214	22	18	18	23	18	12	14	14	13	14	20	28
2009	382	24	17	39	43	39	19	21	31	36	39	41	33
2010	421	36	28	41	42	39	24	28	30	30	36	38	49
2011	1,050	60	96	90	101	102	85	63	52	59	96	124	122
2012	1,283	132	105	115	104	104	102	82	84	80	113	120	142
2013	1,800	152	143	159	157	156	117	101	107	150	169	210	179
2014	2,738	225	169	211	223	225	200	184	126	226	281	375	293
2015	3,179	329	283	284	282	261	187	169	215	271	269	316	313
2016	3,800	310	308	344	387	263	260	215	209	294	336	336	538
2017	5,085	434	466	491	464	433	374	285	241	396	511	460	530
2018	5,549	562	461	523	487	391	468	305	355	466	464	461	606
2019	7,211	524	490	668	686	575	480	488	411	645	769	749	726
2020	9,115	724	763	737	713	617	791	623	740	805	826	887	889
2021	9,719	759	595	946	962	817	618	564	718	772	857	998	1,113
2022	12,545	1,090	1,077	1,293	1,264	943	846	727	738	883	1,045	1,397	1,242
2023	3,538	1,053	1,263	1,222									

== See also ==
- Solar power in Nebraska
- Wind power in the United States
- Renewable energy in the United States
