= Ysgol Morgan Llwyd =

School in Wrexham, UK

Coordinates: 53.0508°N 2.9697°W

- Wrexham; Wales

Information
- Established: 1963; 63 years ago
- Years taught: 7-13
- Language: Welsh

Ysgol Morgan Llwyd is a Welsh-medium comprehensive school in Wrexham, in north-east Wales. It is the first, and is the only Welsh-medium secondary school in Wrexham County Borough. It is named after the seventeenth-century preacher and author Morgan Llwyd. The school has been in Cefn Road since 2000. Previously it was located on Stockwell Grove.

There are seven houses or forms into which the approximately 800 pupils are divided. These are Alun, Bers, Clywedog, Dyfrdwy, Erddig, Gwenfro and Hafod. These are named after local rivers and places – the River Alun, Bersham, River Clywedog, River Dee, Erddig and the River Gwenfro.

The 2014 Estyn inspection report indicated that forty per cent of pupils came from homes in which Welsh was spoken by one or both parents.

== History ==
Ysgol Morgan Llwyd opened in 1963 with 36 pupils, as the first Welsh-medium secondary school in Wrexham. The school was initially housed in obsolete army barracks off Bryn-y-Cabanau Road. A new school building was built on the site with a main entrance on Stockwell Grove, opening in 1975. The student population grew. In the 1990s a new home for the school was found – a former site of the Cartrefle Teacher Training College on Cefn Road. The school opened on its new site in 2000, after building work to expand the facilities on the site. St. Christopher's School moved to the old site on Stockwell Grove.

From 2005 the school was involved in the pilot scheme of the Welsh Baccalaureate.

From 2018 construction started on a new sixth form block with eight classrooms and other facilities, which was due to open in 2019. Construction was by Read Construction and the estimated cost was £1.5 million.

== Feeder schools ==
The feeder schools for Ysgol Morgan Llwyd include:

- Ysgol Plas Coch, Wrexham
- Ysgol Bryn Tabor, Coedpoeth
- Ysgol I.D. Hooson, Rhosllanerchrugog
- Ysgol Bodhyfryd, Wrexham
- Ysgol Min-Y-Ddol, Cefn Mawr
- Ysgol Llanarmon, Llanarmon-yn-Iâl
- Ysgol Cynddelw, Glyn Ceiriog
- Ysgol Bro Alun, Gwersyllt

The majority of pupils from these schools transfer to Ysgol Morgan Llwyd. Many pupils from other schools, with either Welsh language or English language background, also attend the school.

== Activities and sport ==
Year 7 pupils have the opportunity to visit Glan Llyn, an Urdd outdoor activity centre on Llyn Tegid. Some pupils in years 10 to Year 13 (sixth form) participate in the Duke of Edinburgh award programme. School excursions have included trips to Germany, France, the Czech Republic, America and Belgium.

All pupils have the opportunity to compete in Urdd events at the National Eisteddfod and at the County Eisteddfod. The school choir has had success in the Urdd Eisteddfod and the Llangollen International Eisteddfod, and won the show choir competition in the 2014 Llangollen Eisteddfod.

The annual school Eisteddfod is usually held on St. David's Day, and is open for years 7 to 10 with pupils participating in many competitions, including form choir, garage/kitchen band and whistling.

In earlier years the Theatr y Ddraig drama club productions included Sweeney Todd, Grease and Blind Date.

Football and netball matches are held against other schools in Wrexham. There is a Tae Kwon Do club.

== Subjects available ==
- Welsh - (split to Language and Literature at GCSE; as a Welsh A-Level)
- English - (split to Language and Literature at GCSE; only available as Literature at A-Level)
- Mathematics - (at GCSE; at A-Level Pure Maths is taken, but can specialise for Statistics or Mechanics)
- French - (at GCSE, NVQ(Level 1&2) and A-Level)
- Spanish - (GCSE and NVQ(level 1&2))
- Science (Biology/Chemistry/Physics)- (Single/Double/Triple Award at GCSE; available at A-Level)
- Art - (at GCSE and A-Level)
- Geography - (at GCSE and A-Level)
- History - (at GCSE and A-Level)
- Religious Education - (compulsory until Year 11 for all students, can study further at GCSE and A-Level)
- Politics - (A-Level only)
- Child Development - (at GCSE and A-Level)
- Physical Education - (compulsory until Year 11 for all students, can study further at GCSE and A-Level)
- Information Technology - (at OCR and A-Level)
- Design and Technology (GCSE courses) - Resistant Materials, Graphics, Systems, Textiles and Food.
- Design and Technology (A-Level courses -Product Design)
- Leisure and Tourism (GCSE)
- Media Studies (GCSE and A-Level)
- Construction (BTEC level 1)

=== Twilight courses ===
- Psychology (at GCSE)
- French (at GCSE and NVQ)
- Spanish (at GCSE and NVQ)

== Notable former pupils ==
- Rhodri Glyn Thomas (born 1953), politician, Minister for Heritage in the Welsh Government, Plaid Cymru AM for Carmarthen East and Dinefwr
- Jane Dodds (born 1963), politician, Leader of the Welsh Liberal Democrats, MP for Brecon and Radnorshire
- Grahame Davies (born 1964), poet, author, librettist, former journalist and courtier
- Llŷr Williams (born 1976), concert pianist
- Mike Williams (born 1979), journalist, Editor in Chief of NME and of Sight & Sound
- Lowri Tynan (born 1987), swimmer, represented Wales at the 2002 and 2006 Commonwealth Games
- Dewi Penrhyn Jones (born 1994), cricketer for Glamorgan County Cricket Club
