= Henry Norris =

Henry Norris may refer to:

- Sir Henry Norris (courtier) (c. 1482–1536), Groom of the Stool to Henry VIII, alleged lover of Anne Boleyn
- Sir Henry Norris, 1st Baron Norreys (c. 1525–1601), Elizabethan courtier
- Henry Norreys (colonel-general) (1554–1599), English soldier and son of Henry Norris, 1st Baron Norreys
- Henry Handley Norris (1771–1850), English High Church clergyman
- Sir Henry Norris (businessman) (1865–1934), British businessman, football chairman and politician
- Henry Norris (engineer) (1816–1878), British civil engineer
- Henry Norris (actor) (1665–1730?), English actor

== See also ==
- Henry Norris Russell (1877–1957), US astronomer
- Norris (disambiguation)
- Norreys
