= Matthew Norris =

Matthew Norris may refer to:

- Matthew Norris (cricketer)
- Matthew Norris (Royal Navy officer)
- Matt Norris, Minnesota politician
