= Frank Norris (disambiguation) =

Frank Norris (1870–1902) was an American journalist and novelist.

Frank Norris may also refer to:

- Frank Norris (bishop) (1864–1945), Anglican missionary bishop
- Frank Norris (footballer) (1869–1934), English footballer with Preston North End and Darlington
- J. Frank Norris (1877–1952), Baptist preacher and Christian fundamentalist
- Sir Frank Kingsley Norris (1893–1984), Australian military officer and physician
