= Solar power in Nebraska =

Overview of solar power in the U.S. state of Nebraska

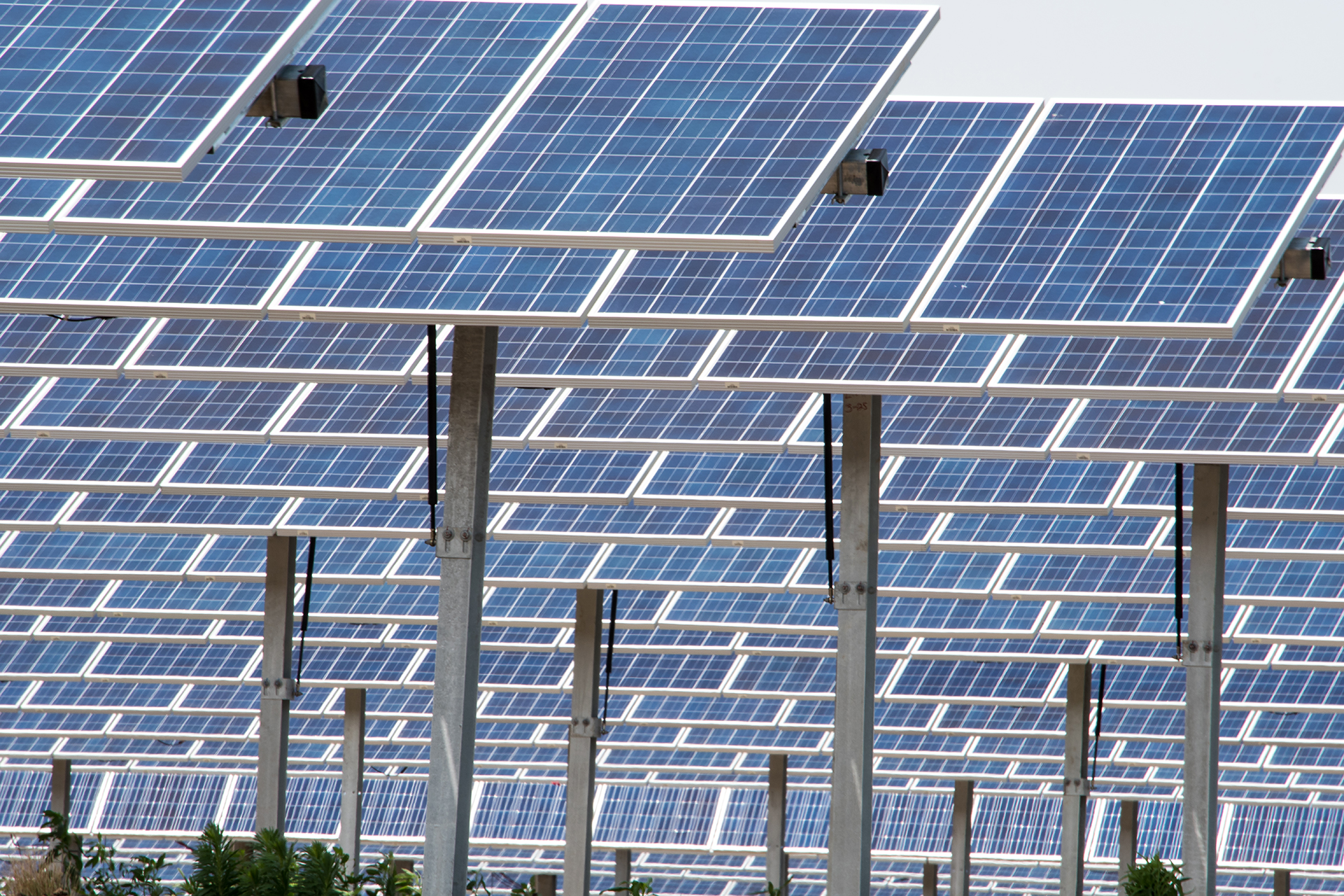
Lincoln Electric System community solar facility

Solar power in Nebraska is used for only a very small percentage of the state's electricity, although it is rapidly becoming competitive with grid electricity, due to the decrease in cost and the 30% tax credit, which can be used to install systems of any size. In 2024, the state ranked 44th among the 50 U.S. states with 203 MW of installed capacity.

Solar power and wind power could be harvested to provide all of Nebraska's energy need, although they would require either transmission lines to provide power when neither is available or storage. Estimates show that Nebraska could generate 3,832,600 GWh/year from wind, and 34.1% of demand from rooftop solar panels, using 8,200 MW of solar panels.

== Utility installations ==
Nebraska had seven utility-scale solar installations sized larger than 1.0 MW at the end of 2019. These include a 5.8 MW system in Kearney and a 3.6 MW system in Lexington; both commissioned in 2017. A 3.6 MW community solar plant on the west side of Lincoln was to be finished in 2016.

Project name	Location	Coordinates	Capacity (MW_{AC})	Year opened	Ref
City of Lexington	Dawson County		3.6	2017	
Fort Calhoun	Washington County		5.0	2019	
Hastings	Adams County		1.5	2019	
Holdrege	Lancaster County		4.0	2016	
Kearney	Buffalo County		5.8	2017	
Lon Wright	Dodge County		2.3	2018	
Platteview Solar	Saunders County		81	2024	
South Sioux City	Dakota County		2.3	2016	

== Statistics ==
Source: NREL

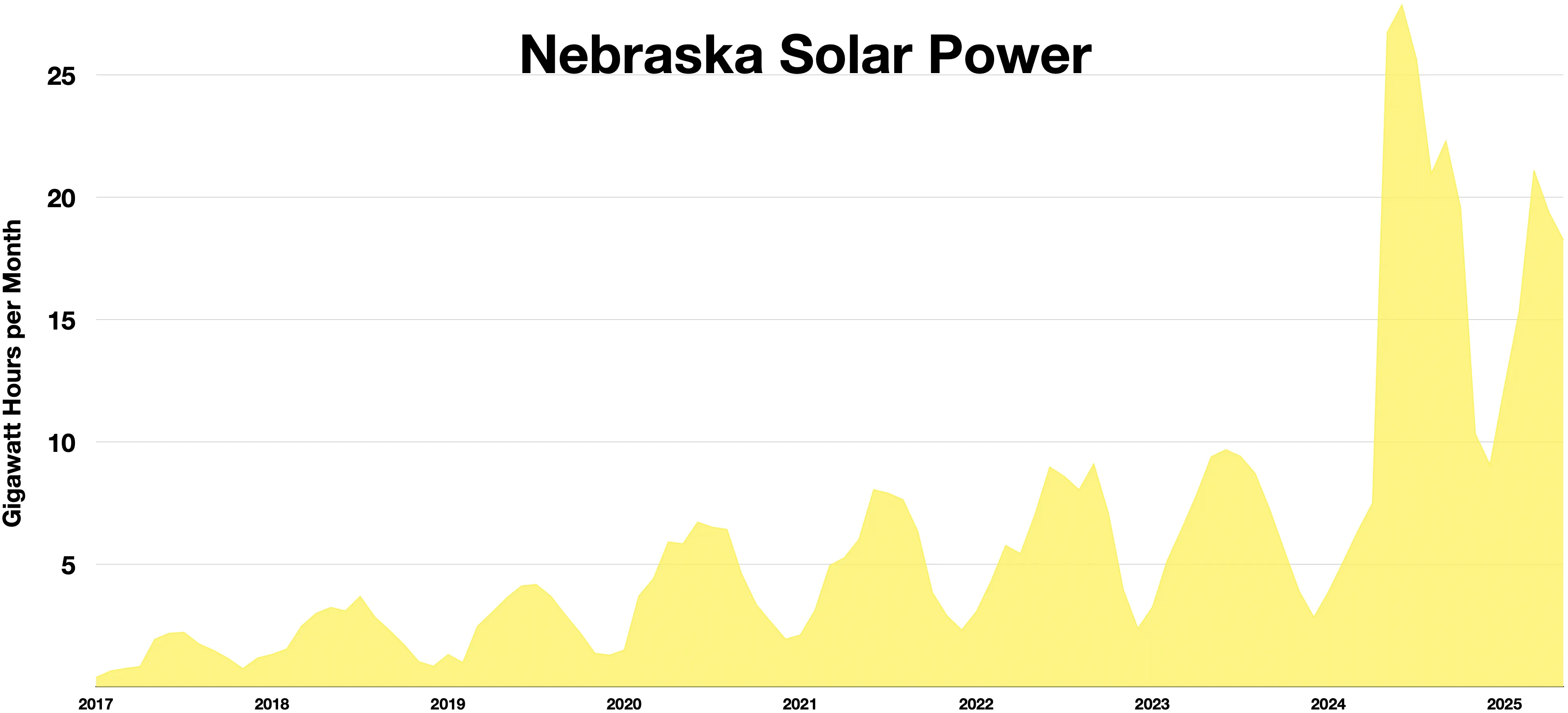
Nebraska solar power

Grid-connected PV capacity (MW)
Year	Capacity	Change	% change
2010	0.2	0.2	>100%
2011	0.3	0.1	50%
2012	0.4	0.1	33%
2013	0.6	0.2	50%
2014	0.8	0.2	33%
2015	1.1	0.3	37%
2016	14.2	13.1	1190%
2017	35.2	21.0	148%
2018	43.2	8.0	23%
2019	55.2	12.0	28%
2020	63.0	7.8	14%
2021	73.6	10.6	16%
2022	83	9.4	12%

Utility-scale solar generation in Nebraska (GWh)
Year	Total	Jan	Feb	Mar	Apr	May	Jun	Jul	Aug	Sep	Oct	Nov	Dec
2016	5	0	0	0	0	0	1	1	1	1	1	0	0
2017	15	0	1	1	1	2	2	2	2	1	1	1	1
2018	27	1	2	2	3	3	3	4	3	2	2	1	1
2019	31	1	1	2	3	4	4	4	4	3	2	1	2
2020	55	2	4	4	6	6	7	7	6	5	3	3	2
2021	57	3	3	5	6	6	6	6	6	5	4	4	3

== See also ==
- Wind power in Nebraska
- Solar power in the United States
- Renewable energy in the United States
