= Valmont Industries =

Nebraska-based manufacturer of center pivot irrigation systems and utility poles

Valmont Industries, Inc.
- Type: Public
- Traded as: NYSE: VMI; S&P 400 Component
- Industry: Diversified Industrial
- Founded: 1946; 80 years ago in Nebraska, United States
- Founder: Robert B. Daugherty
- Headquarters: 15000 Valmont Plaza, Omaha, Nebraska, United States
- Area served: International
- Key people: Avner M. Applbaum (president and CEO)
- Products: Products for the infrastructure and agriculture markets
- Brands: 31
- Revenue: ▲US$4.10 billion (2025)
- Net income: ▲US$350 million (2025)
- Total assets: 84 manufacturing facilities
- Number of employees: 11,000 (2023)
- Website: www.valmont.com

Valmont Industries, Inc. is a large, publicly held American manufacturer of Valley center pivot and linear irrigation equipment, windmill support structures, lighting and traffic poles and steel utility poles.

Their corporate office is in Omaha, Nebraska. Their plant and irrigation department is in Valley, Nebraska. Valmont has many worldwide locations including Europe, China and India.

The company was founded by Robert B. Daugherty.

In 1966, the Valley Manufacturing Company became Valmont Industries, named after the two neighboring towns of Valley and Fremont.

Mogens Bay was appointed Head Chairman and C.E.O. following the retirement of founder Robert B. Daugherty in 2004.

Valmont acquired Shakespeare Composite Structures from Philips in 2014.

== See also ==
- Wind power in Nebraska
