= Grande Prairie Wind Farm =

Wind farm in Nebraska, USA

- Official name: Grande Prairie Wind Farm
- Country: United States
- Location: Holt County, Nebraska
- Coordinates: 42°36′29″N 98°25′42″W
- Construction began: August 2015
- Commission date: December 2016
- Owners: Allianz, BHE Renewables

Wind farm
- Type: Onshore

Power generation
- Units operational: 200 turbines
- Make and model: Vestas V110-2.0 MW
- Nameplate capacity: 400 MW
- Capacity factor: 42.8% (average 2017–2022)
- Annual net output: 1,501 GW·h

The Grande Prairie Wind Farm is a 400 megawatt (MW) wind farm spanning northeastern Holt County in the U.S. state of Nebraska. It increased wind generating capacity in the state by 50% to become the largest such facility upon its completion in late 2016. It is owned and operated by Berkshire Hathaway Energy and the power is being sold to the Omaha Public Power District (OPPD) under a 20-year power purchase agreement (PPA).

== Details ==
The facility spans about 45,000 acres of farm and grazing land in the north central region of the state near the city of O'Neill. It includes 200 Vestas V110-2.0 MW wind turbines for which most components were manufactured in Colorado. Many turbines are located in the corners of the irrigated crop circles to minimize the impact to agricultural production. The annual lease payments to the participating landowners total more than $2 million, and about 25 people are employed in ongoing operations and maintenance activities.

Mortenson Construction built the facility from August 2015 to December 2016, employing about 350 workers. In addition to erection of the turbines, new infrastructure included access roadways, turbine foundations, electrical collection and transmission lines, and two high-voltage substations.

The project was initiated in 2008 by Midwest Wind Energy Development Group, eventually completing much of the planning and approval work. Developer Geronimo Energy purchased the project in 2013, and secured the initial PPA with OPPD. BHE Renewables then purchased the project in early 2015, and announced that it would finance construction. Allianz Global Investors announced it was taking a $400 million interest in the project at the time of its completion.

Electricity production data from the U.S. Energy Information Administration shows that the facility operated at an average 42.8% capacity factor during its first six years of operation.

== Electricity production ==
Grande Prairie Wind Farm Electricity Generation (MW·h)
Year	Total Annual MW·h
2016	168,466
2017	1,541,058
2018	1,507,208
2019	1,434,129
2020	1,552,416
2021	1,454,696
2022	1,515,545
Average (years 2017–2022) --->	1,500,842

== See also ==
- Wind power in Nebraska
- List of wind farms in the United States
