= Robert Norris =

Robert, Bobby, Rob or Bob Norris may refer to:

- Robert Allen Norris (1922–2010), American ornithologist and botanist
- Robert Norris (sheriff) (born 1963), of Kootenai County, Idaho
- Robert Norris (Vermont politician), member of the Vermont House of Representatives
- Rob Norris, retired Canadian politician
- Robert O. Norris Jr. (1880–1960), American politician from Virginia
- Bobby Norris (born 1986), English television personality
- Bob Norris (Ghost Whisperer), a fictional character in the television drama Ghost Whisperer
- Robert Norris (footballer) (born 1987), English footballer
- Robert Norris (basketball) (1924–2018), British basketball player
- Robert W. Norris (1932–2024), United States Air Force general
- Bob Norris (footballer) (1875–1940), English footballer
- Bobby Norris, racehorse trainer, see Arkle Challenge Trophy
- Robert C. Norris (1929–2019), actor who portrayed the Marlboro Man
