= Dewi Penrhyn Jones =

Welsh cricketer

Personal information
- Full name: Dewi Penrhyn Jones
- Born: September 9, 1994 (age 32); Wrexham, Denbighshire, Wales
- Batting: Right-handed
- Bowling: Right-arm fast
- Role: Bowler

Domestic team information
- Years: Team
- 2014–2016: Glamorgan (squad no. 30)
- FC debut: 14 September 2015 Glamorgan v Northamptonshire
- Last FC: 22 September 2015 Glamorgan v Gloucestershire
- LA debut: 26 July 2014 Glamorgan v Middlesex
- Last LA: 15 July 2016 Glamorgan v Pakistan A

Career statistics
Competition	FC	LA
Matches	2	4
Runs scored	26	0
Batting average	26.00	–
100s/50s	0/0	0/0
Top score	17	0*
Balls bowled	192	124
Wickets	5	3
Bowling average	38.00	61.66
5 wickets in innings	0	0
10 wickets in match	0	n/a
Best bowling	3/55	1/22
Catches/stumpings	1/–	0/–
- Source: CricketArchive, 1 January 2017

Dewi Penrhyn Jones (born in Wrexham in 1994) is a Welsh cricketer who has played for Glamorgan County Cricket Club. He is a right-arm seam bowler.

Penrhyn Jones attended Ysgol Bodhyfryd junior school and Ysgol Morgan Llwyd in Wrexham before taking his GCSEs and A levels at Ellesmere College in Shropshire, where he was offered a cricketing scholarship.

played cricket for Brymbo C.C at junior and senior level and represented Wales at all levels from Under 11's to the senior team, who play in the Minor Counties Cricket Championship. Penrhyn Jones was selected for Glamorgan's academy in 2013 before being offered a professional contract in September 2014. He played in first-class match against Pakistan A in July 2016.

Penrhyn Jones was released by Glamorgan at the end of the 2016 season. He played for Bowdon Cricket Club in the Cheshire County Premier League during the 2017 season.

Penrhyn Jones has also played cricket for Wombourne C.C and Shrewsbury C.C in the Birmingham and District Premier League and has played several games for Malpas Cricket Club in the Meller Braggins cricket league in Cheshire.
