= Peggy Norris =

American physicist

Margaret Ann (Peggy) McMahan Norris (also published as M. A. McMahan) is a retired American nuclear physicist and physics educator. Her career included 25 years as a researcher at the Lawrence Berkeley National Laboratory, and another 14 years working in physics outreach at the Sanford Underground Research Facility and Black Hills State University.

== Education and career ==
Norris is the daughter of a West Texas oilman who encouraged her childhood passion for science, and as a high school student she traveled to Northern Illinois University for a summer program in quantum chemistry. As an undergraduate at Rice University, she earned a double major in chemistry and physics, graduating in 1975. She continued her studies in nuclear chemistry and laser physics as a doctoral student at Columbia University, receiving a Ph.D. in chemical physics in 1981.

After two years as a postdoctoral researcher at the Lawrence Livermore National Laboratory, she moved to the Lawrence Berkeley National Laboratory in 1983, initially continuing her postdoctoral research in the laboratory's Nuclear Science Division. She obtained a permanent position at the Lawrence Berkeley National Laboratory in 1985, and worked there on its SuperHILAC, Bevalac, 88" Cyclotron, and Gammasphere projects. While there, she also headed the laboratory's Diversity Committee, and became known for her physics education efforts.

In 2008, after 25 years at the Lawrence Berkeley National Laboratory, she was hired by the Sanford Underground Research Facility and Black Hills State University to become deputy director for education and outreach at the facility. She retired in 2022, but continues to serve the Contemporary Physics Education Project as vice president for nuclear physics.

== Personal life ==
Norris's many hobbies include ballroom dancing, genealogy, contract bridge, and chasing eclipses.

== Recognition ==
Norris was named as a Fellow of the American Physical Society (APS) in 2002, after a nomination from the APS Forum on Education, "for her creative leadership and initiative in bringing nuclear science to students, teachers, and the public". In 2022, after she retired, the Sanford Underground Research Facility gave her their CORES Award.
