= Norris (given name) =

The given name Norris is mainly used in the United States.

== People with the given name Norris ==
- Norris Agbakoko, German basketball player
- Norris Brown, American politician
- Norris Brown (American football) (born 1961), American football player
- Norris Cole, American basketball player
- Norris Coleman (born 1961), NBA forward for the Los Angeles Clippers, 1994 Israeli Basketball Premier League MVP
- Norris McWhirter, co-compiler of The Guinness Book of Records
- Norris Webb (born 1945), Panamanian basketball player
- Norris Denton Wilson (1938–2017), known by his stage name Norro Wilson, American country music singer-songwriter

== See also ==
- Norris (surname)
