= Charles Norris =

Charles Norris may refer to:

- Charles Gilman Norris (1881–1945), American novelist
- Charles Norris (etcher) (1779–1858), English topographical etcher and writer
- Charles Norris-Newman (1852–1920), British journalist, adventurer and intelligence officer
- Charles Norris (medical examiner) (1867–1935), American pioneer of forensic toxicology
- Charles Norris (Royal Navy officer) (1900–1989)
- Dom Charles Norris (1909–2004), British stained-glass artist
- Chuck Norris (musician) (Charles Eldridge Norris, 1921–1989), American jazz and blues guitarist
- Chuck Norris (politician) (Charles Reed Norris, 1925–2009), American politician
- Charlie Norris (1963–2023), American professional wrestler
- Charlie Norris (footballer) (1881–1940), Australian rules footballer

== See also ==
- Chuck Norris (Carlos Ray Norris, 1940–2026), American actor and martial artist
