= Aneesh Kapil =

English cricketer

Personal information
- Full name: Aneesh Kapil
- Born: 3 August 1993 (age 33); Wolverhampton, England
- Nickname: Simba
- Batting: Right-handed
- Bowling: Right arm fast-medium

Domestic team information
- Years: Team
- 2010–2013: Worcestershire (squad no. 22)
- 2014–2016: Surrey (squad no. 47)
- 2019: Sussex
- FC debut: 10 August 2011 Worcestershire v Sussex
- LA debut: 22 May 2011 Worcestershire v Yorkshire

Career statistics
Competition	FC	LA	T20
Matches	15	20	14
Runs scored	499	315	63
Batting average	21.69	26.25	7.87
100s/50s	1/1	0/1	0/0
Top score	104*	59	15
Balls bowled	550	233	84
Wickets	14	5	6
Bowling average	29.14	58.80	17.83
5 wickets in innings	0	0	0
10 wickets in match	0	0	0
Best bowling	3/17	1/18	3/9
Catches/stumpings	4/–	3/–	4/–
- Source: Cricinfo, 20 August 2019

Aneesh Kapil (born 3 August 1993) is an English first-class cricketer who has played for Worcestershire County Cricket Club and Surrey. A right-handed batsman and right-hand fast-medium pace bowler he made his first-class debut for Worcestershire against Sussex in August 2011.

== County career ==
Kapil's first competitive appearance for Worcestershire came in a List A game against Yorkshire in May 2011. He scored 44 from 55 balls, ending up second top scorer for Worcestershire as they posted a disappointing 155. Kapil bowled 5 overs in the reply going for 21 in a seven wicket defeat. Kapil made his Twenty20 debut in June 2011 playing against Lancashire in an 8-run loss at Old Trafford. On 29 June 2011, Kapil played in a T20 match against Northamptonshire, Kapil claimed 3 wickets for 9 runs restricting Northamptonshire to 129 as Worcestershire won by 6 wickets. In July 2011, Kapil played in five youth one-day Internationals for England U-19. His best performances came in the second and fifth games. In the first Youth ODI Kapil starred with the ball taking 4 wickets for 36 as England won by six wickets. In the fifth ODI, Kapil scored 54 runs from 45 balls in a one-wicket loss for England. Kapil played in a first-class match against Lancashire in August 2011; he took 3 wickets and scored 31 in the match as Worcestershire lost by 98 runs.

In April 2014 Kapil joined Surrey on a trial. He played in the second eleven championship match against Gloucestershire at Bristol and two one day second eleven trophy matches against Gloucestershire and Sussex at Bristol and Horsham respectively. He was then registered by Surrey and made his first-class debut for the County at Canterbury on 4 May against Kent. He scored his maiden first class century against New Zealand A that same year. After an impressive 2014 season he was rewarded a contract extension, before ultimately being released in 2018.

He is currently pursuing legal action against his former employers Sussex, accusing them of sabotaging his cricketing career
