= Thomas Norris =

Thomas Norris or Tom Norris may refer to:

== United Kingdom ==
- Thomas Norris (fl. 1363–1391), MP for Lewes
- Thomas Norris (died 1425) (died 1424/25), MP for Barnstaple, Totnes and Plympton Erle
- Thomas Norris (died 1599) (1556–1599), English soldier and politician in Ireland
- Thomas Norris (died 1607), MP for Castle Rising
- Thomas Norris (died 1700), MP for Liverpool
- Thomas Norris (1765–1852), English businessman, art collector, naturalist and astronomer
- Thomas Norris (composer) (1741–1790), English musician, singer and composer
- Tom Norris (boxer) (fl. 1925), Welsh boxer
- Tom Norris (musician) (born 1971), English songwriter and musician

== United States ==
- Thomas R. Norris (born 1944), retired United States Navy SEAL
- Tom Norris (record producer) (born 1991), American mixing engineer and record producer

== See also ==
- Norris Thomas (born 1954), American football player
