= Rex Norris =

Rex Norris may refer to:

- Rex Norris (American football) (born 1939), American football coach
- Rex Norris (field hockey) (1899–1980), Indian Olympic field hockey player
