= Norris, Missouri =

Unincorporated community in Missouri, U.S.

Coordinates: 38°31′14″N 93°53′44″W

Norris is an unincorporated community in Henry County, in the U.S. state of Missouri.

== History ==
The community took its name from a nearby creek of the same name. An early variant name was "Norris Forks". A post office called Norris Fork was established in 1852, the name was changed to Norris in 1882, and the post office closed in 1902.
