= Matthew Norris (cricketer) =

South African cricketer (born 1992)

Personal information
- Full name: Matthew Jonathan Norris
- Born: 18 December 1992 (age 33); Cape Town, South Africa
- Batting: Left-handed
- Bowling: Slow left-arm orthodox
- Source: ESPNcricinfo, 7 September 2016

Matthew Norris (born 18 December 1992) is a South African cricketer. He is a left-handed batsman and a left-arm orthodox bowler. He made his first class debut for Cardiff MCCU against Glamorgan on 2 April 2014.
