= Norris, Nebraska =

- Abandoned village
- Location within the state of Nebraska
- Coordinates: 42°29′47″N 97°09′09″W
- Country: United States
- State: Nebraska
- County: Cedar

Population (2000)
  - Total: 0
- Time zone: UTC-6 (Central (CST))
  - Summer (DST): UTC-5 (CDT)
- Area code: 402

Norris is an abandoned village in Cedar County, NE, was surveyed in the mid-1870s and established by about 1878. It consisted of about 40 acres centered at the intersection of present-day 874th Road and 569th Avenue.

== History ==
Norris was named after A. Hart Norris a New York investor who, in 1873, purchased over 3000 acres in the area. Norris had intended to name the town “Elm City” but, as the elms died, he was convinced by others to name it after himself. By the early 1880s Norris consisted of a hardware store, creamery, blacksmith shop, hotel, livery stable, drug, merchandise and furniture stores, a real estate office and several homes. A school was located near the south edge of the city. The Logan Valley post office, established in 1874, had its post office name changed to Norris October 3, 1881. The Norris post office was closed 27-OCT-1887 and moved to Coleridge, NE. Neither Logan Valley nor Norris survived.

Mr. Norris and the Chicago, St. Paul, Minneapolis & Omaha Railway failed to reach agreement for a right of way through his town in 1883. Thus, the railroad was built two miles west of Norris, and lots began selling in what would become the town of Coleridge, approximately 3 miles west and 1 mile north of Norris. By early 1885 many of Norris's businesses had moved to Coleridge. A Cedar County Plat Map (2) showed Norris still having 16 lots at its original location in 1899. The Norris School (District 30), organized March 16, 1880, was dissolved and merged with Coleridge District 41 in 1959. The Norris Cemetery is located one mile east and ¾ mile north of the former city of Norris.
