= Frank Norris (bishop) =

Francis Lushington Norris (1 September 1864 – 2 July 1945) was an Anglican missionary bishop.

Norris was educated at Winchester College and Trinity College, Cambridge. Ordained in 1888, his first ministry position was as a curate at Tewkesbury Abbey. after which he went to China as an SPG missionary, serving largely in Peking. In 1914 he became the Bishop of North China. He retired in 1940 and died of pneumonia on 2 July 1945 in the Japanese Prisoner of War Camp, Shanghai.
