= Hopton, Derbyshire =

Coordinates: 53°04′34″N 1°36′54″W

Hopton
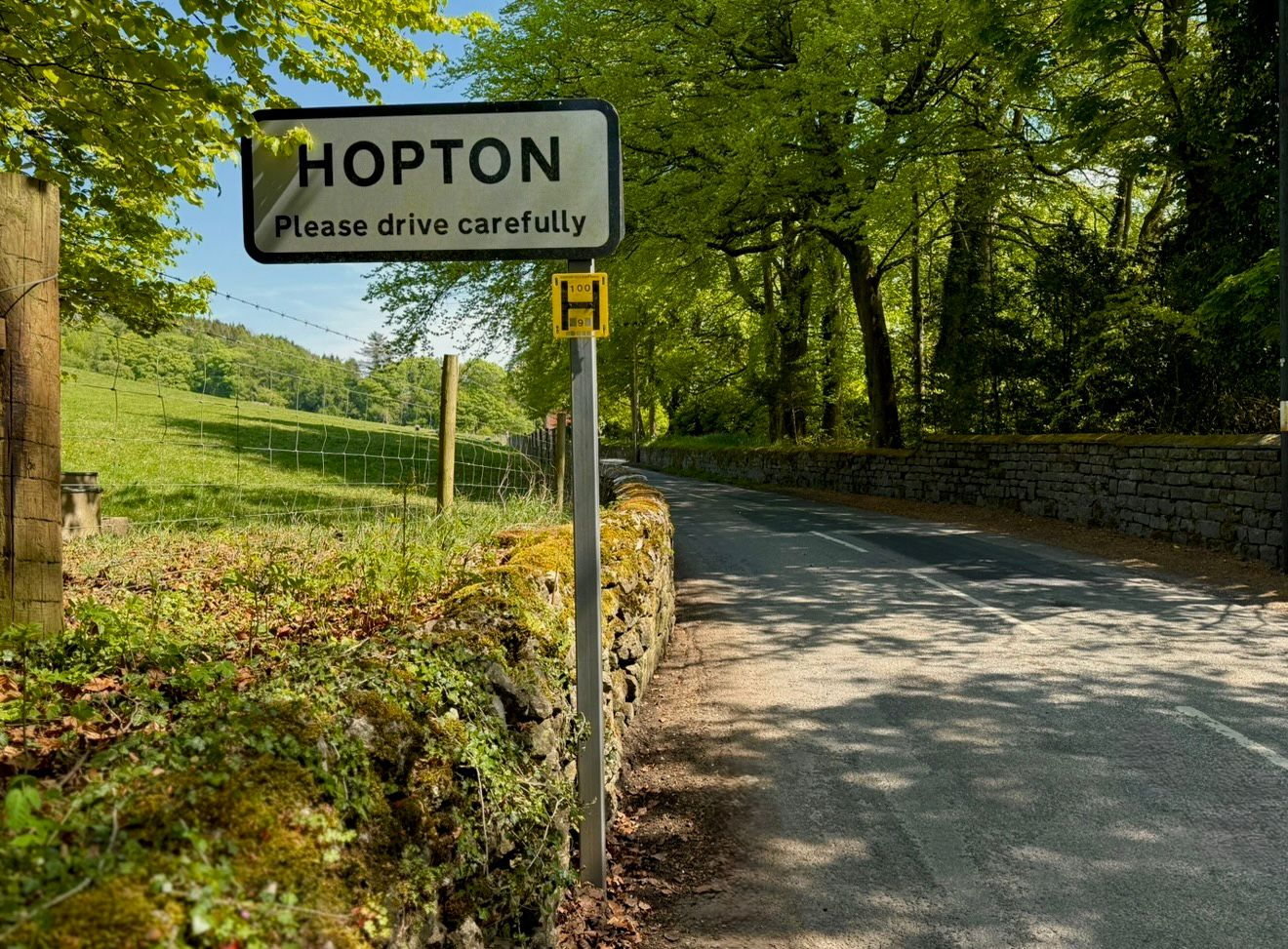

- Location within Derbyshire
- Population: 104 (2021 census)
- OS grid reference: SK257532
- Civil parish: Hopton
- District: Derbyshire Dales
- Shire county: Derbyshire
- Region: East Midlands
- Country: England
- Sovereign state: United Kingdom
- Post town: Matlock
- Postcode district: DE4
- Dialling code: 01629
- Police: Derbyshire
- Fire: Derbyshire
- Ambulance: East Midlands
- UK Parliament: Derbyshire Dales

Hopton is a village and civil parish adjacent to Carsington, in the Peak District of Derbyshire, England. It is two miles (3 km) west of Wirksworth and seven miles (11 km) east of the market town of Ashbourne.

Hopton is historically associated with Hopton Hall, the historic seat of the Gell family, which shaped the area's agricultural, industrial, and social development over six centuries. The village's history includes evidence of prehistoric activity, Roman lead mining, possibly as Lutudarum, and a long association with Hopton Wood Stone, a limestone used in several major works, including Imperial War Graves and the Houses of Parliament.

In the 21st century, Hopton is centred on tourism, agriculture, and its proximity to attractions such as Carsington Water and Hopton Hall. Griffe Grange forms the northern part of the parish, on the Hopton Via Gellia. The Hopton Quarry Nature Reserve occupies part of the former limestone quarry site, and Hopton Hall's gardens remain open to the public seasonally.

In the 2021 UK census, Hopton had a population of 104.

== History ==
=== Prehistoric and Roman ===
A Palaeolithic hand axe found near Hopton provides evidence for human activity during a warm Aveley Interglacial period, around 200,000 years ago. Early Neolithic pottery and evidence of settlement activity were also excavated in the area.

In prehistoric times, woolly rhinoceros lived in the area; the near-complete remains of one were discovered in the Dream Cave near Hopton in 1822. Philip Gell wrote to Sir Everard Home about the discovery that "the rhinoceros appears to have occupied the centre of the cave, the ox and deer one end, and the smaller animals the other end." Concentrations of "Early Bronze Age lithic finds from the area around Hopton Incline" have also been discovered, including arrowheads and other indications of potential Bronze Age activity.

Excavations during the construction of Carsington Water found evidence of Roman activity in the area. Multiple archaeologists have suggested Lutudarum, an administrative centre of the Roman lead industry, was located in the Carsington and Hopton area. Evidence cited for this theory includes the existence of Roman cupellation plants in Carsington, as well as lead pigs found in the area. Lead pigs marked with Lutudarum "have been found across the Roman Empire," including Syria and Libya.

"A Romano-British settlement site is known to have existed a short distance to the north" of Hopton, alongside pottery fragments. There was a Roman villa nearby (now beneath Carsington Water), and The Street, a Roman road, ran through the village towards Derventio. A fort has "often been assumed" at Carsington and Hopton, in line with "normal Roman military practice". However, the precise location has not been established and remains a subject of debate.

=== Middle Ages ===
Hopton is mentioned in the Domesday Book in 1086 as Opetune, a berewick (supporting farm) of Wirksworth in the Wapentake of Hamston. Its manorial history began about a century later, with the construction of a hall in the 1200s. In 1870–72, it was described as covering 642 acres, with a population of 115. The deserted medieval village of Welledene in Carsington, or Weldon, recorded in the Domesday Book, is thought to have been nearby. It has been lost for centuries, with a later settlement record being a call to summon jurors for Wirksworth Manor Court in 1792.

In the Middle Ages and early modern period, Hopton was part of the "Wirksworth Wapentake" and within the liberties of the "King's Field", where royal officials regulated lead mining.

Griffe Grange, north of Hopton and near Middleton-by-Wirksworth, was historically linked with Hopton's woodland and mining activity. It is within the Hopton civil parish, with the names Hopton and Griffe Grange appearing in some historical records. In 1870–72, Griffe Grange was described as covering 672 acres with a population of 18.

Historically, Hopton's main industries were farming, forestry, and mining. Carsington and Hopton also shared a history of lead mining and manorial governance by the Gell family.

=== English Civil War and raid ===
The war in Derbyshire, 1642 to 1646; key locations

As part of the estate of Sir John Gell, 1st Baronet, Hopton was held by Parliamentarian forces during the English Civil War. Many men from Carsington and Hopton served in Gell's Regiment, commanded by Sir John and his brother, Thomas.

Gell's position as the "leading Parliamentarian in Derbyshire", alongside feuds with other nobles, led to Hopton Hall and the village being sacked in 1642 by Royalist forces commanded by Philip Stanhope, 1st Earl of Chesterfield, during King Charles I's visit to Derbyshire. The raid caused considerable damage and loss; after the war, Gell claimed financial losses of around £5,000 due to the "Pillaging of Hopton", petitioning Parliament for compensation. A later record from Gell orders the 1st Earl of Leven's "Scottish forces not to plunder Hopton, or any of Sir John Gell's houses or lands." The damage remained "visible and imposing… as the family fortunes, depleted by fines paid to the Crown, prevented repairs and improvements until the end of the 18th century".

Gell later sacked Stanhope's Bretby Hall and Elvaston Castle, vandalising "his late rival Sir John Stanhope's tomb and gardens" in early 1643 as retaliation before moving west to fight in the Battle of Hopton Heath. Gell later married Mary Stanhope, the widow of Sir John, "causing much discontent amongst other nobles."

=== Toponymy ===
While settlements in Hopton and Griffe Grange predate the Anglo-Saxon and Norse periods, only those names remain in modern usage. The name elements are:

- hop (Old English) "A valley; a remote enclosed space; a piece of enclosed land in a fen; an enclosure in marsh or moor".
- tūn (Old English) "An enclosure, farmstead, village, or estate".
- gryfja (Old Norse) "A hole, or pit".
- grange (Middle English) "A grange: originally a granary; or, a barn; later a farm; also an outlying farm belonging to a religious house or a feudal lord, where crops were stored".

'Hoptūn and Gryfja Grange' can be interpreted as the "Valley and Pit farming settlement", reflecting its longstanding agricultural history and usage. The Domesday Book records the name as Opetune and the local summary Optune or Opitune.

The Carsington and Hopton area has also been previously recorded as Gershitune, meaning "the settlement of the [water] cress farm", a reference to Carsington's former water source of Scow Brook. Much of the brook's course was inundated by the Carsington Water reservoir in 1991.

Scow Brook historically formed the upper reaches of Henmore Brook, still running by Hognaston before becoming Henmore Brook downstream.

Hopton also gave its name to the Hopton (also recorded as d'Hopton, de Hopton, or of Hopton) family, a major landowning family in Derbyshire in the 12th and 13th centuries.

== Hopton Hall and the Gell family ==
The village has a long association with the Gell family, who owned land in Hopton from 1327, with records dating family presence back to Robert Gyll in 1209. From 1553, the Gell family lived in Hopton Hall, after its acquisition by Ralph Gell.

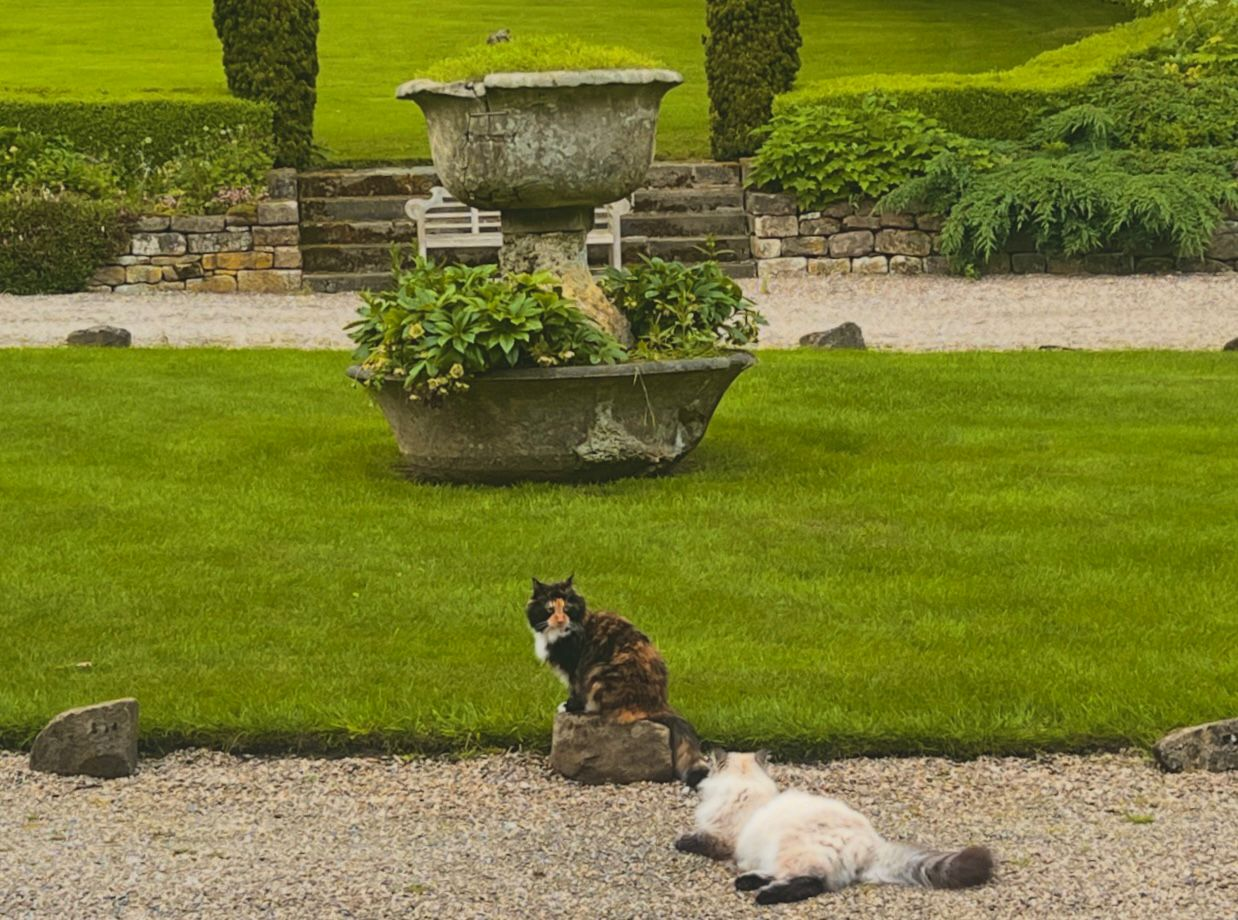
The 'Roman Vase' in front of Hopton Hall's entrance, brought from Pompeii by Sir William Gell

The family had extensive lead mining interests in the Wirksworth area, which contributed to their wealth. The Gell baronetcy, created in 1642 for Sir John Gell, was centred on Hopton.

The Gells lived at and developed Hopton Hall with much of the surviving work carried out under Thomas Gell in the 16th century and remodelled by Philip Gell in the early 19th century.

The Gell family owned much of Hopton during their 600-year association with Hopton Hall, building almshouses, ice-houses, and other infrastructure, including Via Gellia. The family also played a significant role in local society, with members serving as baronets, MPs, high sheriffs, justices of the peace and parish officers.

== Hopton Quarry and Hopton Wood Stone ==
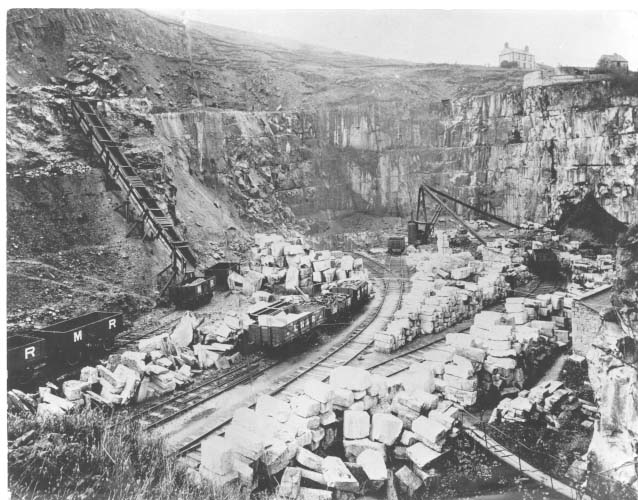
A view of the interior of the quarry in the 1920s. Blocks of Hopton Wood Stone await transportation.

=== Early history ===
Hopton Quarry is located directly north of the village on the Hopton Via Gellia, and primarily produced the 'Hopton Wood Stone' (also called Hoptonwood or Hopton-Wood Stone) limestone. The quarry was first owned by the Gell family and later by Hopton-Wood Stone Firms Ltd. The stone was called "England's premier decorative stone" and described as "remarkably and exceptionally pure limestone, almost identical to marble," with impurities at 0.02%.

In 1870–72, John Marius Wilson's Imperial Gazetteer of England and Wales described Hopton as having "good building limestone, (which) is extensively quarried, and was the material of Chatsworth House and Belvoir Castle. Lead ore also occurs." Many of Hopton's residents were employed in Hopton Wood Stone quarries.

=== Use and later history ===
The Tomb of Oscar Wilde, made out of Hopton Wood Stone

Following World War I, Hopton Wood Stone was used by the Imperial War Graves Commission to supply headstones, with over 120,000 being created and sent to war cemeteries in Britain, Belgium, and France. According to Grindell, Hopton's limestone was "laid with a native black stone, no longer available" to create the first chequerboard floor in England.

It has also been used in decorative work, including the Houses of Parliament, the Bank of England, the Tower of London, Westminster Abbey, Big Ben, Chatsworth House, Hopton Hall, the University of Oxford, several cathedrals, and Oscar Wilde's tomb, among others.

In use from the 18th century on, the Hopton area extracted up to "400,000 to 500,000 tons" of limestone a year until operations ended in 2006.

=== Hopton Quarry Nature Reserve ===
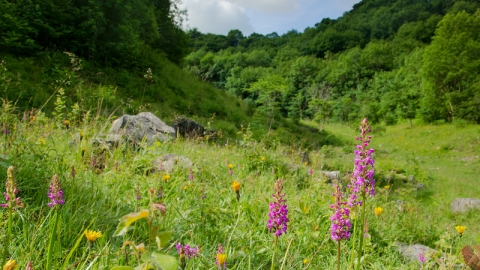
Modern-day Hopton Quarry Nature Reserve. Fragrant orchids can be seen.

Since closure, Hopton Quarry has been redeveloped into a nature reserve operated by the Derbyshire Wildlife Trust. The reserve is described as "supporting a rich variety of (local) wildflowers and habitat... with flat quarry floors supporting a rich diversity of limestone plants."

The Hopton Quarry Nature Reserve covers 8 hectares of land, with fly, frog, fragrant, and common spotted orchids present alongside wildflower and young woodland habitats. It is open to the public free of charge and is classified as 'Red' by the Derbyshire Wildlife Trust, advising "here wildlife is sensitive all year round. Remain on paths and take extra care."

== Geography ==
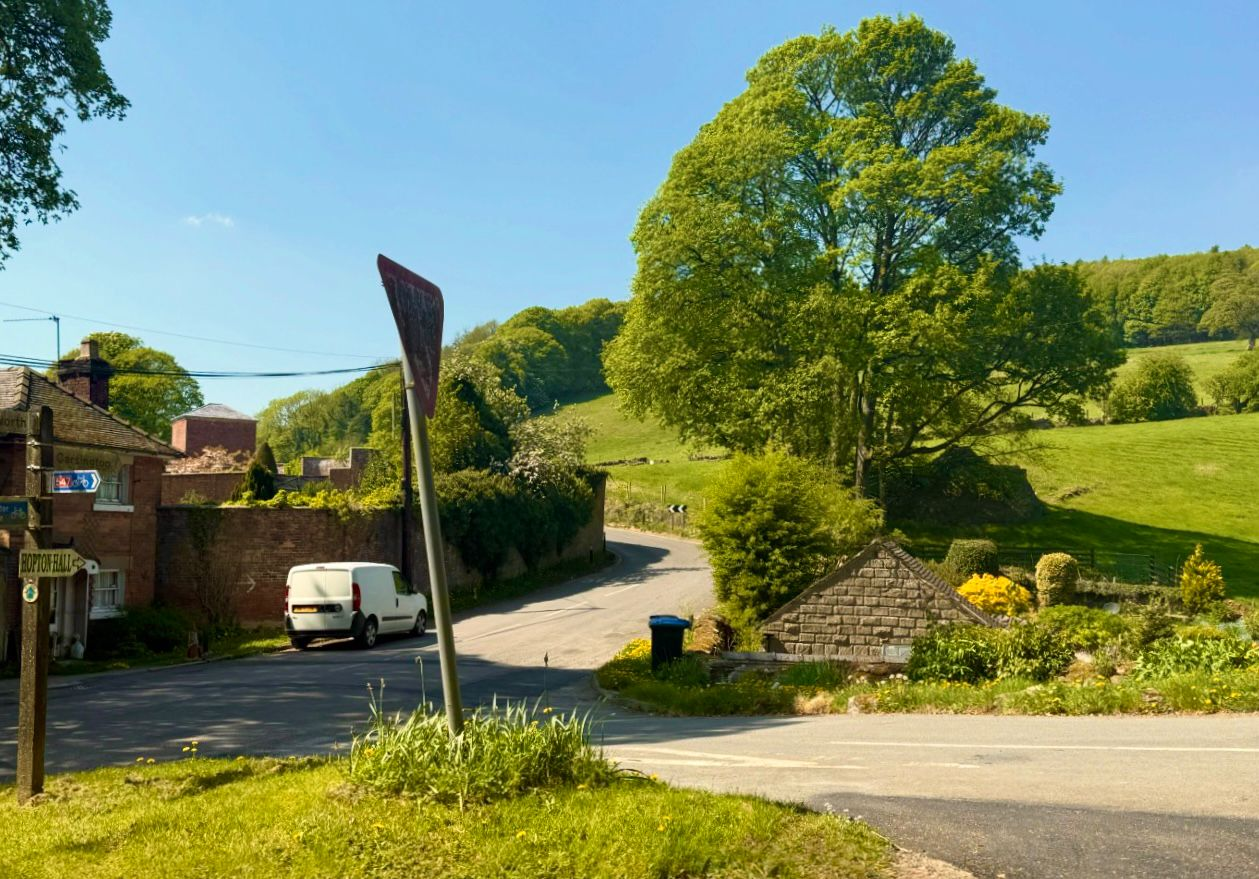
Hopton at the crossroads of Hopton Via Gellia and Main Street. Hopton Hall's formal gardens are visible in the background.

Hopton lies in a wooded valley in the southern White Peak, beside Carsington. Carsington Pasture, a scheduled monument limestone plateau, rises "steeply to 1,000 feet (300 m) to the west" and northwest as an escarpment. The village lies near the B5035 road between Ashbourne and Wirksworth, at the northern end of Carsington Water. Woodland fields at Doglow and Carsington Woods separate Carsington and Hopton while remaining on the same road. Many of the lower-lying fields in Hopton were acquired by Severn Trent in the 1960s and 1970s for the creation of Carsington Water and are now submerged.

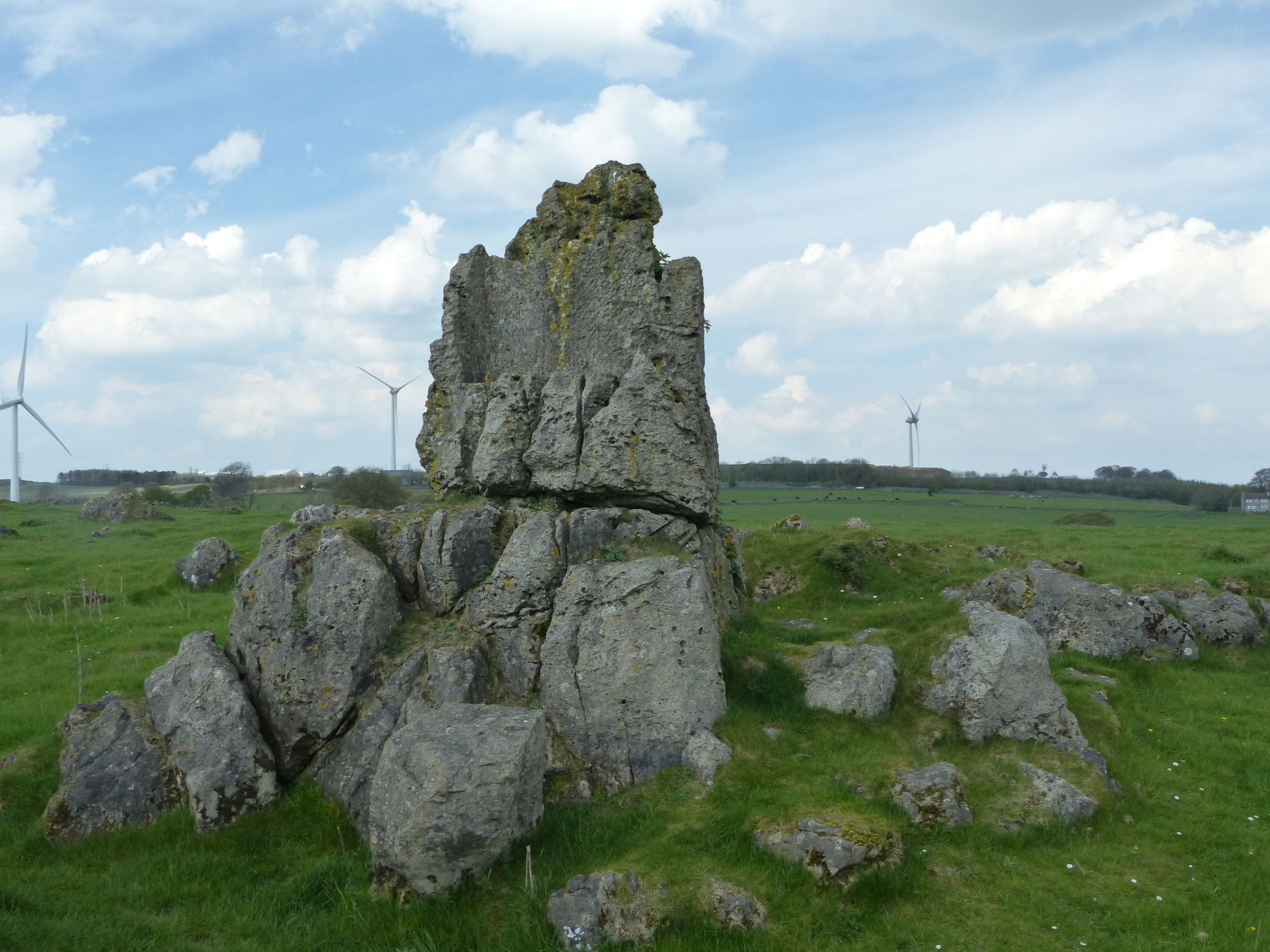
The King's Chair in Carsington Pasture

Several rock formations and barrows lie around the villages. The King's Chair is a limestone outcrop that resembles a throne and overlooks the area. Harboro' Rocks, near Brassington, are also visible from Hopton. Hopton's civil parish has two round barrows: Ivet Low and Round Low, both estimated to be from the Bronze Age. "A cremation was found near the centre (of Round Low) during an excavation in 1848", alongside "calcined bones and flints found in a coarse urn". The area is also "popular (for) walking and cycling".

The Hopton Incline on the former Cromford and High Peak Railway, now part of the High Peak Trail and Pennine Bridleway, is two-thirds of a mile (1 km) north of Hopton and takes its name from it. The Hopton Incline was one of the world's first and steepest long-distance railway lines, and was built between 1825 and 1830.

While closely "linked with Carsington for over a thousand years", the villages maintained separate, but connected, communities and institutions.

=== Climate ===
Hopton

Climate chart (precipitation, max. and min. temperature)
J	F	M	A	M	J	J	A	S	O	N	D
81 6 1	51 7 1	61 9 2	66 12 4	61 15 6	80 18 9	56 20 12	77 19 12	70 17 10	90 13 7	94 9 4	96 6 2
- █ Average max. and min. temperatures in °C
- █ Precipitation totals in mm
Imperial conversion
J	F	M	A	M	J	J	A	S	O	N	D
3.2 42 34	2 44 35	2.4 48 36	2.6 54 39	2.4 59 43	3.1 64 48	2.2 68 53	3 67 53	2.8 63 49	3.5 56 45	3.7 48 39	3.8 43 36
- █ Average max. and min. temperatures in °F
- █ Precipitation totals in inches

Hopton has a Temperate Maritime climate (Köppen: Cfb), typical of the East Midlands. The climate is changeable but rarely extreme, with conditions influenced by the North Atlantic Drift, an extension of the Gulf Stream.

Average daytime temperatures in summer range from 17 to 20 °C (63 to 68 °F), with the highest temperature recorded near Hopton being 37 °C (98 °F) on 19 July 2022, during the 2022 European heatwave. Temperatures during the winter months range from 6 to 10 °C (41 to 50 °F). Frosts and snowfall are common during winter, with the lowest temperature recorded being -17 °C (1 °F), on 21 January 1940.

Precipitation occurs most frequently during autumn and winter, slightly higher than the national average as it lies inland within the Derbyshire Dales and Peak District.

Climate data for Carsington and Hopton, from Ashover No. 2 Weather Station, 1991-2020
Month	Jan	Feb	Mar	Apr	May	Jun	Jul	Aug	Sep	Oct	Nov	Dec	Year
Record high °C (°F)	13.28 (55.90)	17.19 (62.94)	18.05 (64.49)	23.12 (73.62)	25.34 (77.61)	27.16 (80.89)	32.27 (90.09)	30.10 (86.18)	27.11 (80.80)	25.13 (77.23)	17.12 (62.82)	13.01 (55.42)	32.27 (90.09)
Mean maximum °C (°F)	5.49 (41.88)	6.47 (43.65)	9.12 (48.42)	12.34 (54.21)	14.96 (58.93)	17.54 (63.57)	19.85 (67.73)	19.28 (66.70)	17.02 (62.64)	13.07 (55.53)	8.68 (47.62)	6.33 (43.39)	12.51 (54.52)
Daily mean °C (°F)	3.68 (38.62)	4.33 (39.79)	6.39 (43.50)	9.48 (49.06)	12.53 (54.55)	15.27 (59.49)	17.4 (63.3)	16.78 (62.20)	14.24 (57.63)	10.79 (51.42)	6.84 (44.31)	4.62 (40.32)	10.20 (50.35)
Mean minimum °C (°F)	1.11 (34.00)	1.37 (34.47)	2.03 (35.65)	3.84 (38.91)	6.21 (43.18)	8.98 (48.16)	11.8 (53.2)	11.66 (52.99)	9.58 (49.24)	7.21 (44.98)	4.06 (39.31)	2.26 (36.07)	7.84 (46.11)
Record low °C (°F)	−7.0 (19.4)	−9.0 (15.8)	−5.0 (23.0)	−4.0 (24.8)	−3.0 (26.6)	2.0 (35.6)	2.0 (35.6)	0.0 (32.0)	3.0 (37.4)	−3.0 (26.6)	−10.0 (14.0)	−11.0 (12.2)	−11.0 (12.2)
Average rainfall mm (inches)	81.21 (3.20)	50.92 (2.00)	60.97 (2.40)	66.01 (2.60)	60.94 (2.40)	80.0 (3.15)	56.30 (2.22)	77.22 (3.04)	70.05 (2.76)	89.63 (3.53)	94.22 (3.71)	95.69 (3.77)	883.16 (34.78)
Mean monthly sunshine hours	50.69	85.74	122.01	163.83	203.00	190.64	209.90	175.84	139.78	93.95	60.08	47.59	1,543.05
Source 1: Met Office - Long Term Weather Data
Source 2: Climate Data - Hopton, Derbyshire

=== Carsington and Hopton Conservation Area ===
The Carsington and Hopton Conservation Area is predominantly rural. It was designated in 1971, with the boundary extended in 1994 and 2009. Within its 50 hectares are 112 buildings, 31 of which are listed entries.

The conservation area's goal, as stated, is to preserve the archaeological, architectural, and historic significance of the area, especially in relation to the landscape. All new buildings are required to preserve the aesthetics and methods of pre-existing buildings, to "create seamless expansion", according to the most recent council review.

Two of the listed entries within the conservation area are recognised as 'at risk': Hopton Well and the Ice-house opposite Hopton Hall. As of 2026, conservation work is ongoing for both entries.

== Economy ==
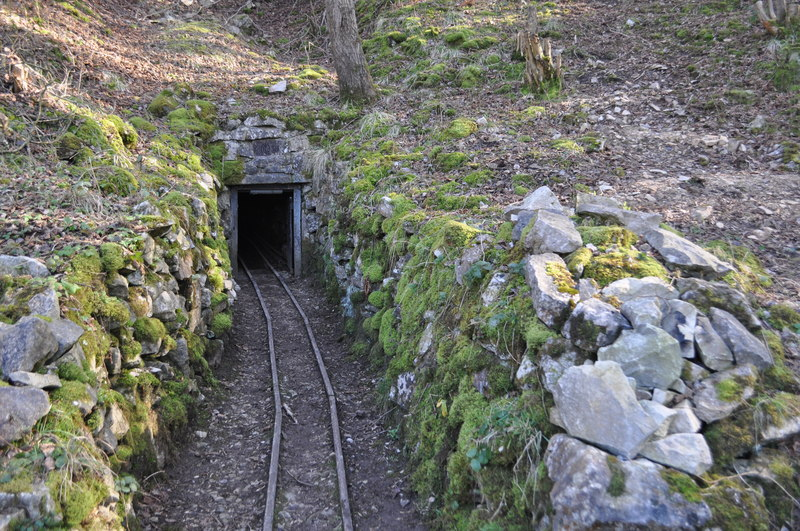
Goodluck Mine on the Via Gellia, north of Hopton

=== Historical ===
The historic economy was centred on Hopton Hall, agriculture, and lead mining.

Agriculture, first as part of Hopton Hall's feudal estate and later through freeholds, competed with mining as Hopton's principal economic activity.

For almost two thousand years, "from the Roman occupation on, there was an important lead industry in the (Wirksworth, Carsington, and Hopton) neighbourhood", peaking in the late 16th century during the Gell baronage.

As lead mining declined, stone quarrying became dominant, employing much of Hopton in Hopton Wood Stone quarries. Agriculture continued to be widespread, with ridge and furrow earthworks still present in the fields surrounding the village.

The Gells, to support their industrial interests, built the Via Gellia in the 19th century. The wagon road connected lead mines in Hopton to smelters in Cromford and to the newly built Cromford Canal. Hopton Via Gellia, connecting the main Via Gellia to Hopton, improved economic access. Viyella, described as the "first branded fabric in the world", was named after the road and spun north of Hopton village.

=== Modern ===
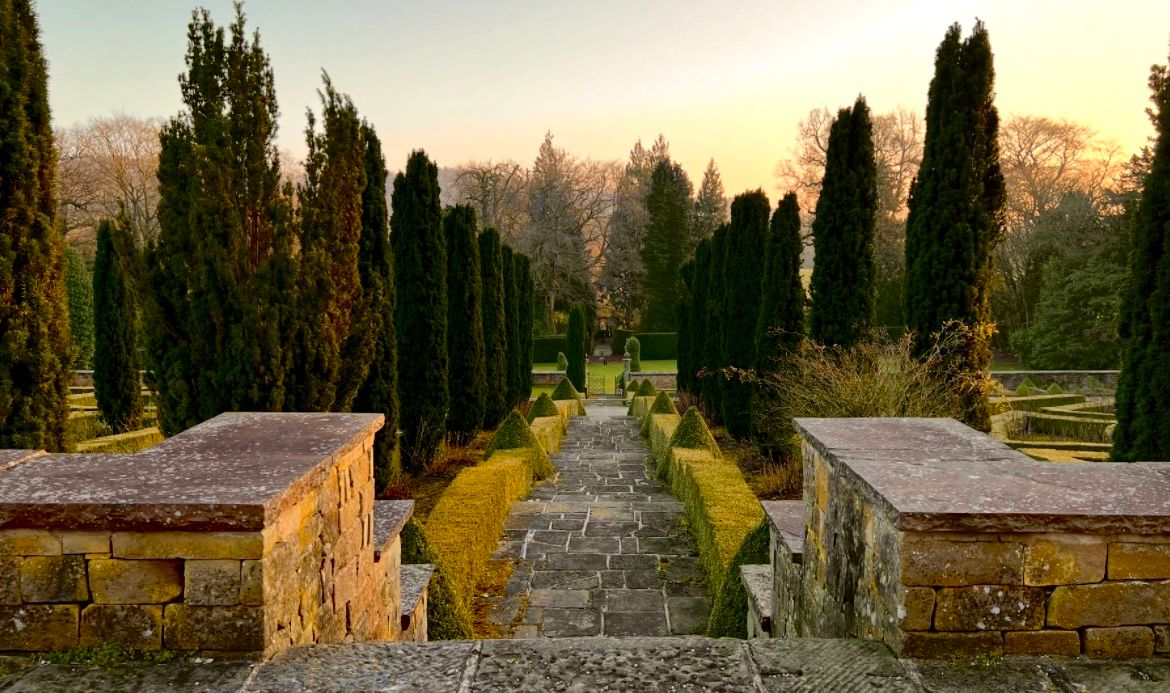
The formal gardens at Hopton Hall

Hopton's 21st century economy is mixed, mainly based on tourism and agriculture.

Manufacturing is also present in Griffe Grange, including concrete plants, abrasive and aggregate processing, quarries, and excavation work. All heavy-industry work bypasses the village proper.

Many working residents commute to nearby towns (Wirksworth, Matlock, Ashbourne), with the village also hosting a large retired population. Modern hospitality venues include The Miners Arms (historically established to serve local lead miners) in adjacent Carsington and cafes at Hopton Hall.

The village includes a mix of houses, including some used as self-catering accommodation for tourists exploring the Derbyshire Dales, Peak District, and Carsington Water. Hopton Hall's gardens are open to the public in February and July.

The designation of the Peak District as a national park increased tourism, alongside the construction of Carsington Water. Economic activity is seasonal, increasing during the summer and when Hall gardens are open to the public. Access to nearby nature sites, including Dovedale, the River Dove, Harboro', and Black Rocks, also contributes.

== Governance ==
Derbyshire Dales District Council election results from 2023. Hopton, in the centre, is shaded red.

Hopton is part of the Derbyshire Dales constituency, represented in parliament by John Whitby of the Labour Party. The Carsington and Hopton parish council is the first tier of local government and meets at St. Margaret's Church.

The village is in the Wirksworth division for local elections and has returned Labour representatives. However, in the 2025 Derbyshire County Council election, the ward narrowly elected a Reform UK councillor.

Prior to Brexit in 2020, Hopton was a part of the East Midlands constituency in the European Parliament.

== Transport ==
The nearest railway station to Hopton is Cromford station, served by East Midlands Railway for regular use, and Wirksworth station on the heritage Ecclesbourne Valley Railway.

The Cromford and High Peak Railway formerly served Hopton from 1856, before closing in 1967 after the Beeching cuts.

Bus routes that serve Hopton include the 110 and 111 to Ashbourne and Matlock, both operated by Ashbourne Community Transport after Hulleys of Baslow ceased trading.

== Education ==
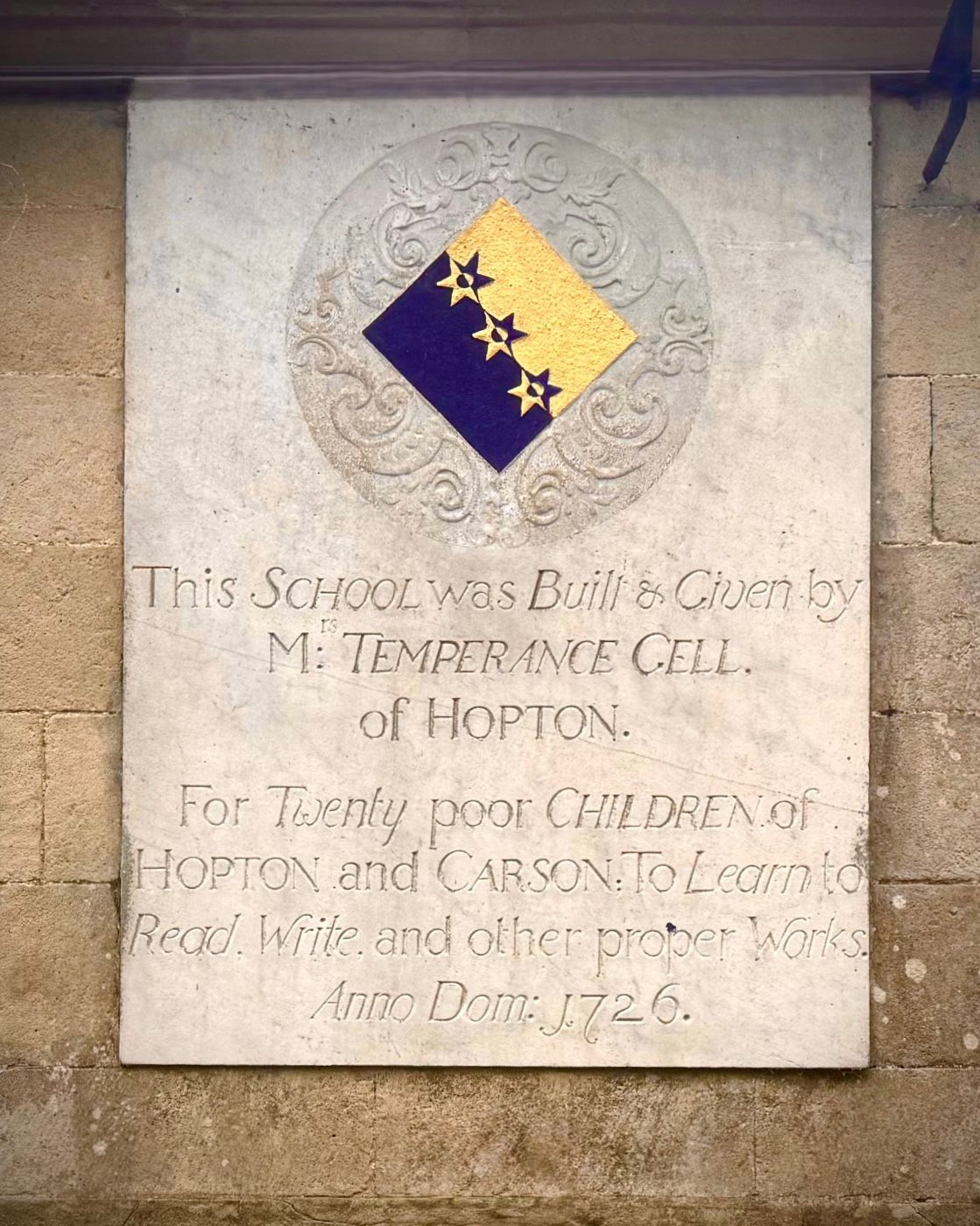
The founding plaque on the outer wall of the school, with the Gell family's original coat of arms

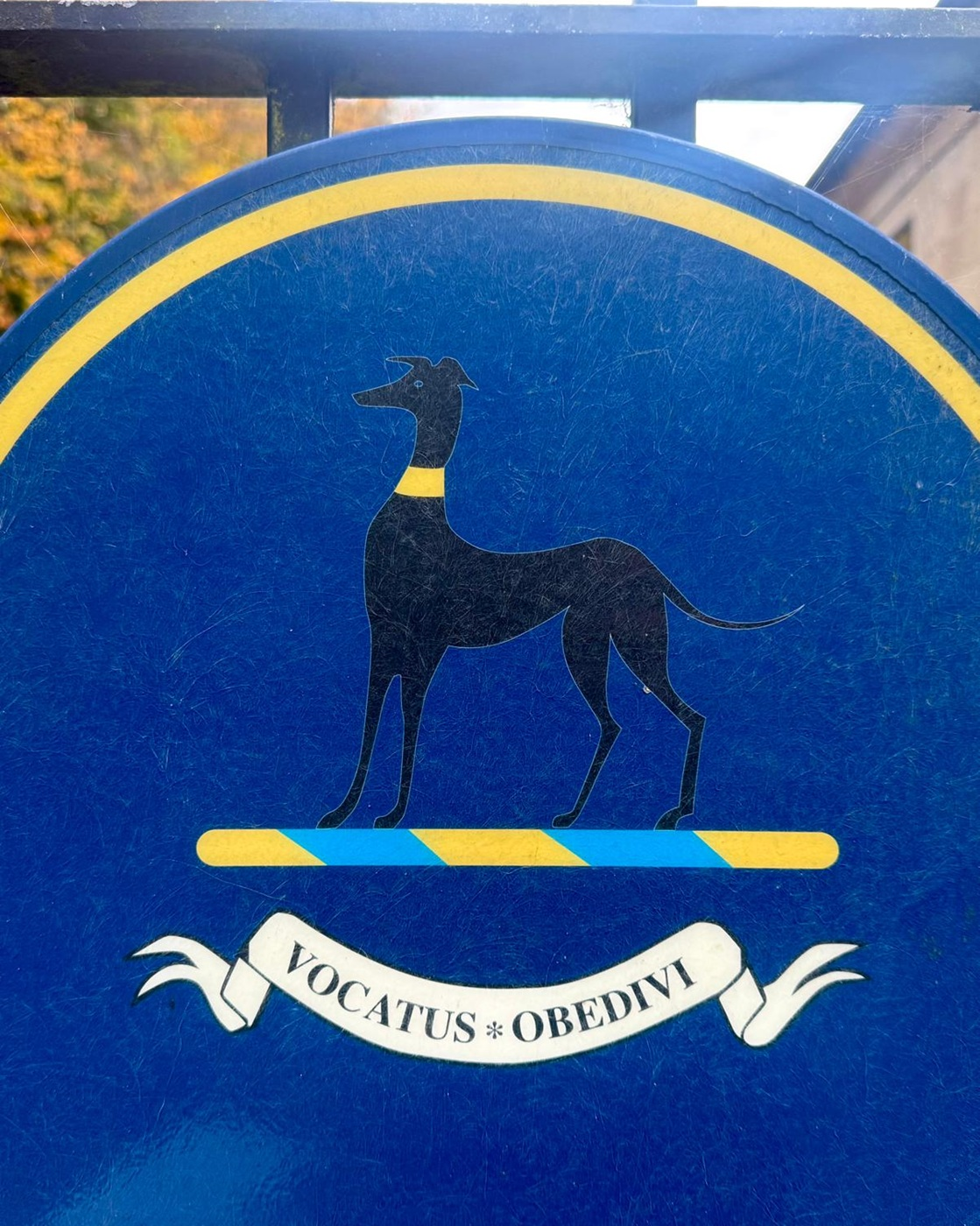
The school badge, based on the Gell family crest

Carsington and Hopton are served by the Carsington and Hopton Church Primary School, a Grade II listed Church of England primary school. Established in 1726 by the Gell family, it retains links to Hopton Hall. The school uses the Gell family crest as its logo.

A plaque on the school wall states: "This School was Built and Given by Mrs Temperance Gell, of Hopton. For Twenty poor Children of Hopton and Carson; To Learn to Read, Write, and other proper Works. Anno Dom: 1726". As of 2025, the school's most recent Ofsted inspection was graded as 'Good', serving 36 pupils with 22.2% eligible for free school meals.

Secondary and sixth-form education is provided by Queen Elizabeth's Grammar School in Ashbourne and Anthony Gell School in Wirksworth. Anthony Gell School was established by Anthony Gell, a resident of Hopton Hall, in 1576 under the name "The Free Grammar School of Anthony Gell Esq.". It was granted a royal charter by Queen Elizabeth on 27 Oct 1584, declaring a "grammar school in Wirksworth for ever, endowed by Anthony Gell."

== Notable people ==
Hopton's association with Hopton Hall and proximity to nearby towns have led to several notable people being associated with Hopton and Hopton Hall throughout history.

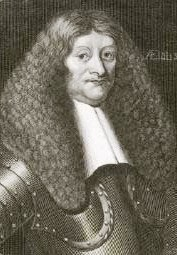
Sir John Gell, 1st Baronet, c. 1880

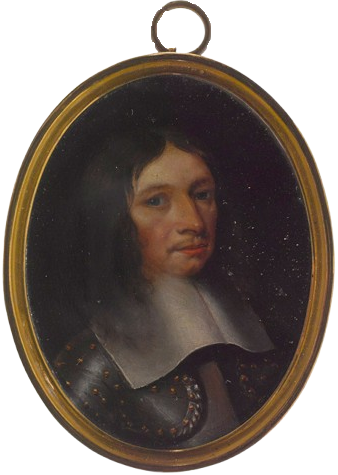
Thomas Gell, c. 1645

=== 16th century ===
- Ralph Gell (1491–1564), grandfather of Sir John Gell, 1st Baronet. Originally acquired the Hopton estate in 1553, and was a "significant local supporter of the Tudors".
- Anthony Gell (c. 1522–1583), founder of Anthony Gell School in Wirksworth, and a law reporter active in the reigns of Edward VI to Elizabeth I.
- Sir John Gell, 1st Baronet (1592–1671), Parliamentary commander, High Sheriff of Derbyshire, and lead magnate. He was recorded as one of the richest men in Derbyshire.
- Thomas Gell (1594–1656), MP, and the younger brother of Gell, 1st Baronet. He was also a colonel under his brother's command in the Parliamentary army during the English Civil War.

=== 17th century ===
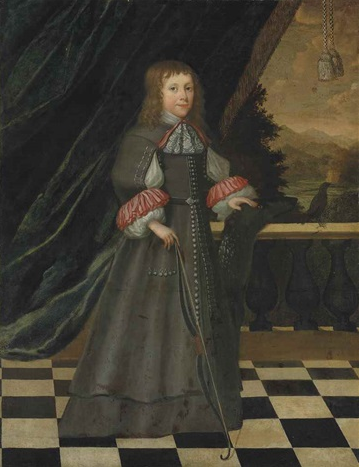
Sir Philip Gell, 3rd Baronet, c. 1664

- Sir John Gell, 2nd Baronet (1612–1689), MP during the three Protectorate Parliaments, later High Sheriff of Derbyshire.
- Katherine Gell (née Packer, 1624–1671), daughter of Sir Percival Willoughby, religious patron, and wife of Gell, 2nd Baronet.
- Sir Philip Gell, 3rd Baronet (1651–1719), the last Gell baronet, MP for Derbyshire during the Convention Parliament.
- Edward Gell (fl. 1654–1656), MP for Derbyshire during the Cromwellian First Protectorate Parliament.

Philip Eyre Gell, c. 1763

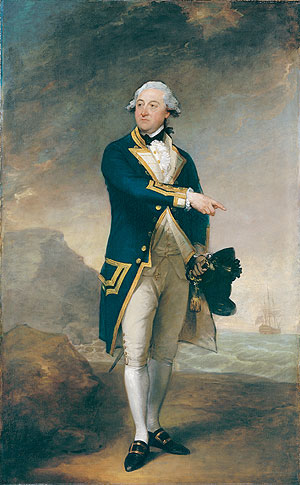
Admiral John Gell, c. 1785

=== 18th century ===
- Philip Eyre Gell (1723–1795), landowner, socialite, and mining magnate. The Portrait of Philip Gell is considered one of Sir Joshua Reynolds' best-known works.
- Admiral John "Fighting" Gell (c. 1740–1806), Royal Navy officer who served in the Seven Years' War, American War of Independence, and French Revolutionary Wars. He later became an Admiral of the White.
- Philip Gell (1775–1842), MP, High Sheriff of Derbyshire, and a Whig politician. His daughter, Isabella, was the wife of William Pole Thornhill.
- Sir William Gell FRS (1777–1836), close confidant of Queen Caroline, an archaeologist and illustrator. He was especially active in Troy and Pompeii, bringing back the 'Roman Vase' from Pompeii for display at Hopton Hall.

=== 19th century ===
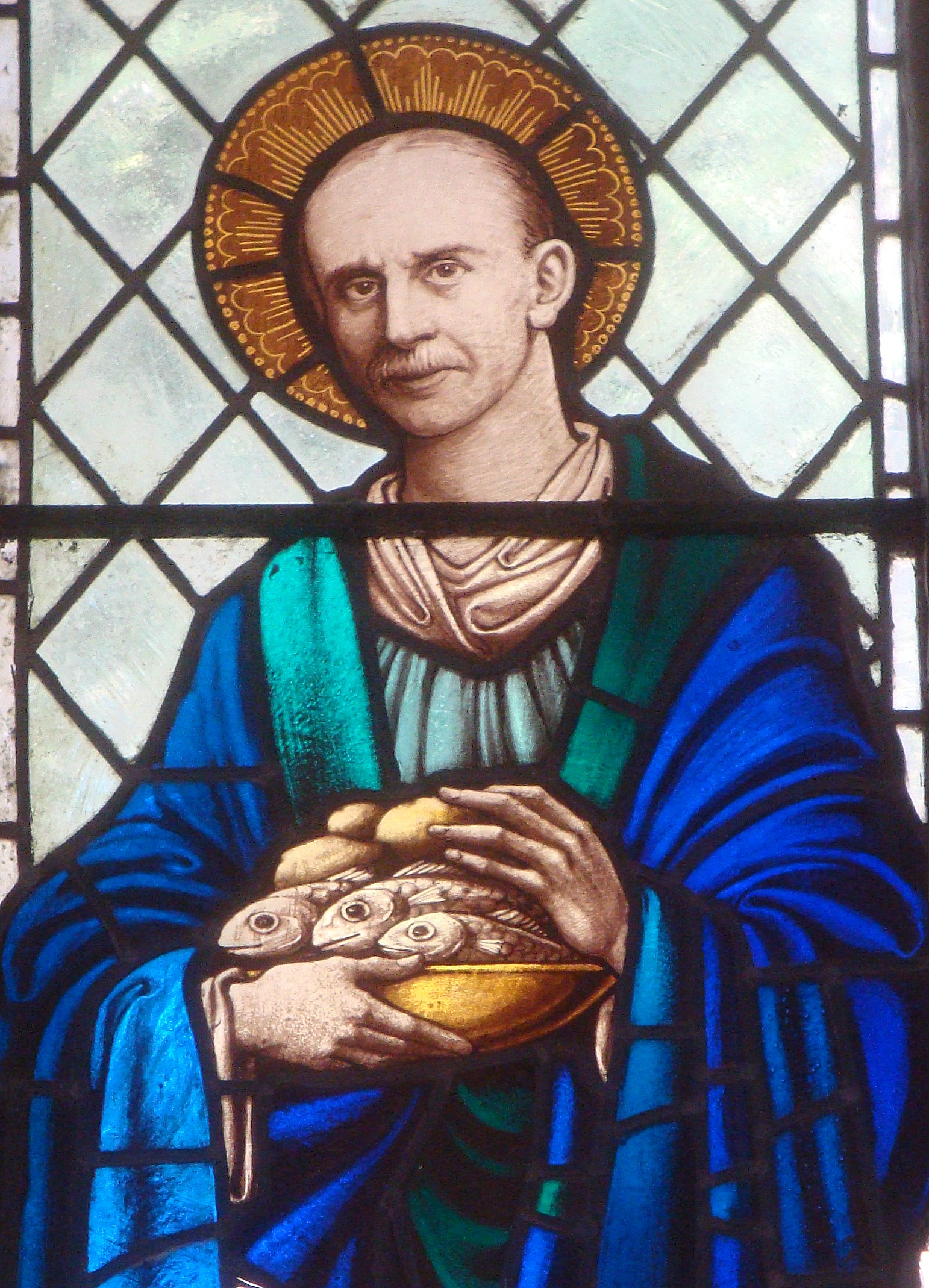
A stained glass representation of Philip Lyttelton Gell, in St Margaret's

- Francis Hurt (1803–1861), MP, High Sheriff of Derbyshire, and first-class cricketer. He was primarily associated with Alderwasley Hall, east of Hopton. In the 1851 census, "it is recorded that the Hurt family was living at Hopton Hall."
- William Pole Thornhill (1807–1876), MP, High Sheriff of Derbyshire, and Liberal politician. He was the husband of Isabella Gell, daughter and heiress of Philip Gell. In accordance with the will of Isabella's father, they briefly took the surname Gell and lived at Hopton Hall before later renouncing inheritance.
- Rev. John Philip Gell (1816–1898), born and lived in Hopton before becoming an Anglican clergyman and educationist in Australia. He founded Christ's College in Bishopsbourne; Queen's School; Launceston Church Grammar School; and The Hutchins School; all in Tasmania. He later became a bishop-designate in New Zealand and a noted Anglican reformer. He married Eleanor Isabella Franklin, daughter of Arctic explorer Sir John Franklin.
- Henry Chandos-Pole-Gell (1829–1902), son of Edward Sacheverell Chandos-Pole, of Radbourne Hall, High Sheriff of Derbyshire, took up the Gell name when left to him via inheritance (taking it as a last name when he began residing at Hopton Hall).
- Walter Taylor (1851–1937), father of the cricketers Will and Francis. He was noted as an avid cricketer and figure in Hopton's community and cricket life.
- Philip Lyttelton Gell (1852–1926), editor at the Oxford University Press and president of the British South Africa Company from 1920 to 1923. He, alongside his wife Edith, played significant roles during the British colonisation of Rhodesia.
- Edith Mary Gell (née Brodrick; 1860–1944), writer and Christian activist. She was the fourth daughter of William Brodrick, 8th Viscount Midleton, and Augusta, daughter of the 1st Baron Cottesloe. She married Philip Lyttelton Gell in 1889.
- George Henry Key (1872–1958), industrialist, civic leader, and chairman of the Matlock Bath Urban District Council. He acquired several of Hopton's Hopton Wood Stone quarries and lead mines in 1915, and built 'Hopton House' in the village.
- William "Will" Taylor (1885–1976), a cricketer who played for Derbyshire between 1905 and 1910 and served as secretary of Derbyshire Cricket Club for 51 years from 1908 to 1959.
- Francis Taylor (1890–1963), cricketer who played for Derbyshire County Cricket Club between 1908 and 1911.

=== 20th century ===
- Sir William Gennydd "Bill" Thomas (born c. 1959), former owner of Hopton Hall and business executive at Electronic Data Systems and Hewlett-Packard, chaired Labour's "small-business task force". Ed Balls forgot his name in the lead-up to the 2015 general election.
- Chris and Andi Harvey (born c. 1964, c. 1970), co-owners of Hopton Hall. The couple also own large business interests in nearby Ashbourne, including Hopton Hall Art Gallery.

== See also ==
- Listed buildings in Hopton, Derbyshire
- History of Derbyshire
