= Carsington =

Village in Derbyshire, England

Coordinates: 53.078°N 1.627°W

- Village
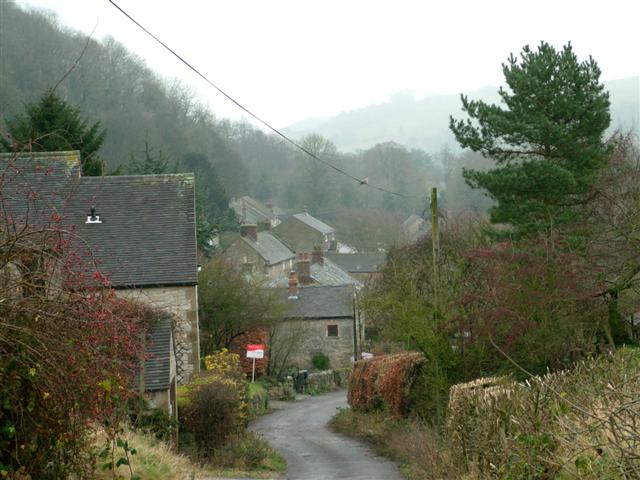
- Carsington village

- Carsington parish highlighted within Derbyshire

- Location within Derbyshire
- Population: 251 (including Godfreyhole, 2011)
- OS grid reference: SK250534
- Civil parish: Carsington
- District: Derbyshire Dales
- Shire county: Derbyshire
- Region: East Midlands
- Country: England
- Sovereign state: United Kingdom
- Post town: MATLOCK
- Postcode district: DE4
- Police: Derbyshire
- Fire: Derbyshire
- Ambulance: East Midlands
- UK Parliament: Derbyshire Dales

Carsington is a village and civil parish adjoined to Hopton, in the Peak District of Derbyshire, England. The village is 2 miles (3km) west of Wirksworth and seven miles (11 km) east of the market town of Ashbourne. It is just north of Carsington Water.

According to the 2011 census, Carsington had a population of 251.

== History ==
Carsington has a long history, including Roman occupation (an old Roman settlement now lies beneath the reservoir). In prehistoric times, woolly rhinoceros lived in the area; the near-complete remains of one such animal were discovered in the Dream Cave nearby Hopton in 1822, with Phillip Gell writing to Sir Everard Home in regards to the discovery that "The Rhinoceros appears to have occupied the centre of the Cave, the Ox and Deer one end, and the smaller animals the other end".

Carsington is recorded in Domesday Book of 1086 as one of the berewicks (supporting farms) of the town and manor of Wirksworth. During the Middle Ages and up until about 1800 it was a major location for lead mining; the lead obtained in the many Brassington and Carsington mines was usually smelted in Wirksworth.

Excavations as part of the Carsington Water reservoir construction revealed that the Romans were once present in the area. Several archaeologists have stated that either Carsington and Hopton, or the wider Wirksworth area, was Lutudarum, a fortress-town and administrative centre of the Roman lead industry. Support for this theory is provided by existence of Roman cupellation plants in Carsington, as well as lead pigs unearthed in the area. However, the precise location has not been established.

The Channel 4 archaeology series Time Team visited Carsington to investigate the archaeology and ancient remains in the pastures, where they visited a cave, discovered by the Pegasus Caving Club, full of ancient human bones.

British aurochs specimen CPC98 was retrieved in 1998 from Carsington Pasture Cave, possesses P mtDNA haplogroup sequences and was radiocarbon dated to 6,738 ± 68 calibrated years BP. Aurochs are a kind of wild cattle.

=== Etymology ===
While human activity and settlement in Carsington predates Anglo-Saxon establishments, the Old English term for the village is still used today.

The name comes from Cærsen (Old English) "growing with cress", and tūn (Old English) an enclosure; a farmstead; a village; an estate. Thus Cærsentūn can literally be translated to 'Farm/settlement growing with cress'. It is recorded in 1290 as being spelt 'Cressington'. Other names recorded include Carson.

The Carsington and Hopton area is recorded as having previously been known as 'Gershitune', meaning "the settlement of the [water] cress farm", given Carsington's former water source of Scow Brook, much of which was inundated by the Carsington Water reservoir in 1991. Scow Brook historically formed the upper reaches the Henmore Brook, with the brook still running by Hognaston before becoming Henmore Brook for the rest of its path.

== Carsington today ==
Today, Carsington has one pub, the Miner's Arms, and a primary school, the Carsington & Hopton Church Primary School. The community is primarily composed of a commuter and retiree contingent to replace the traditional agricultural, mining and quarrying community.

Carsington Reservoir, opened in 1992, stores water from the River Derwent and is operated by Severn Trent Water. It is open all year for recreation, with an extensive cycle path, several bird hides, a water sports and sailing centre. Inside the visitor centre are a trail, several specialist shops including an RSPB shop, and a café/restaurant.

== Governance ==
Derbyshire Dales District Council election results from 2023. Carsington, in the centre, is shaded red.

Carsington is part of the Derbyshire Dales constituency, represented in parliament by John Whitby of the Labour Party. The Carsington and Hopton parish council is the first tier of local government and meets at St. Margaret's Church.

The village is in the Wirksworth division for local elections and has regularly returned Labour representatives. However, in the 2025 Derbyshire County Council election, the ward narrowly elected a Reform UK councillor.

Before Brexit in 2020, Carsington was part of the East Midlands constituency in the European Parliament.

== Transport ==
The nearest railway station to Carsington is Cromford station, served by East Midlands Railway for regular use, and Wirksworth station on the heritage Ecclesbourne Valley Railway. The Cromford and High Peak Railway formerly served Carsington from 1856, before closing in 1967 after the Beeching cuts.

Bus routes that serve Carsington include the 110 and 111 to Ashbourne and Matlock, both operated by Ashbourne Community Transport after Hulleys of Baslow ceased trading.

== Education ==
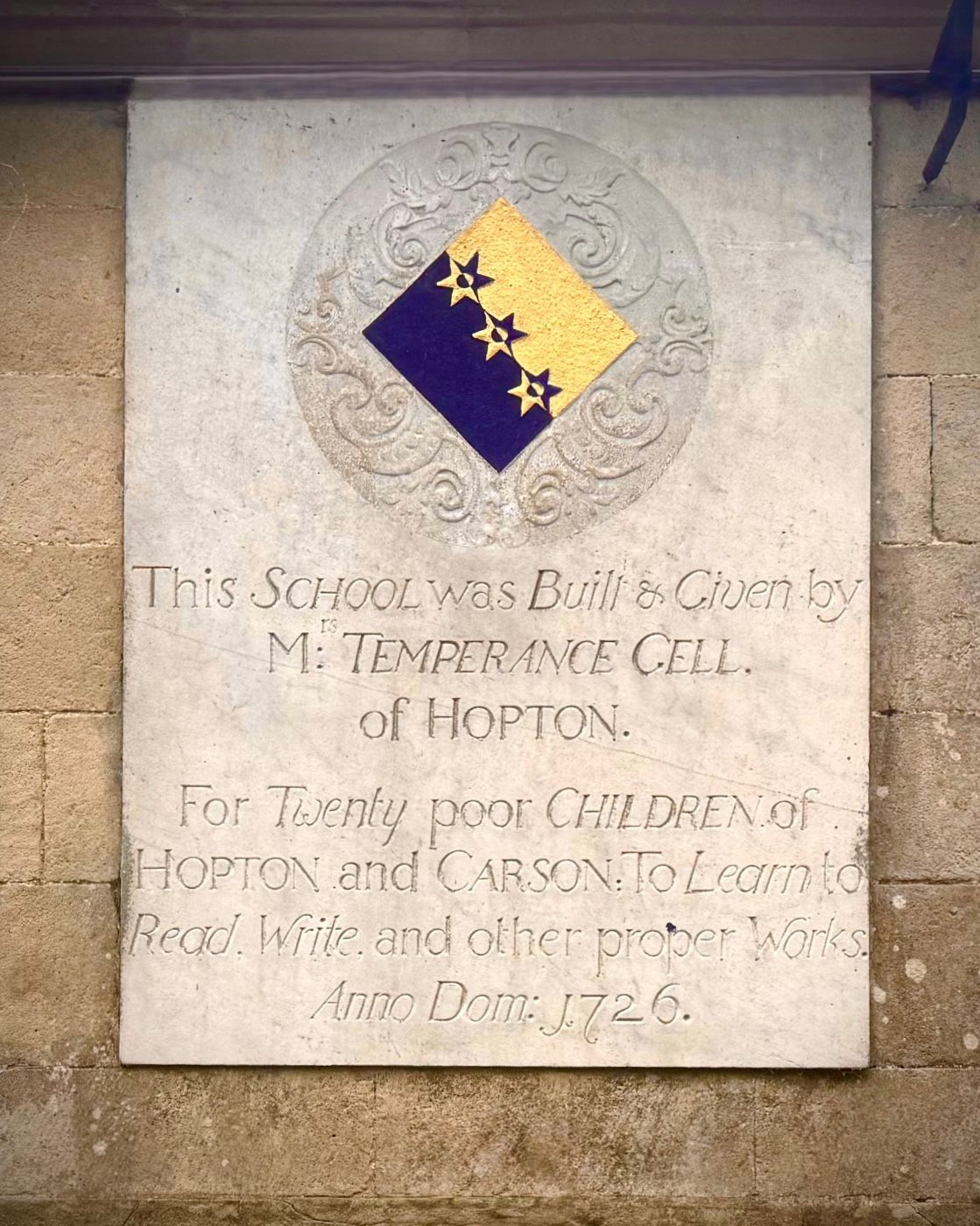
The founding plaque on the outer wall of the school, with the Gell family's original coat of arms

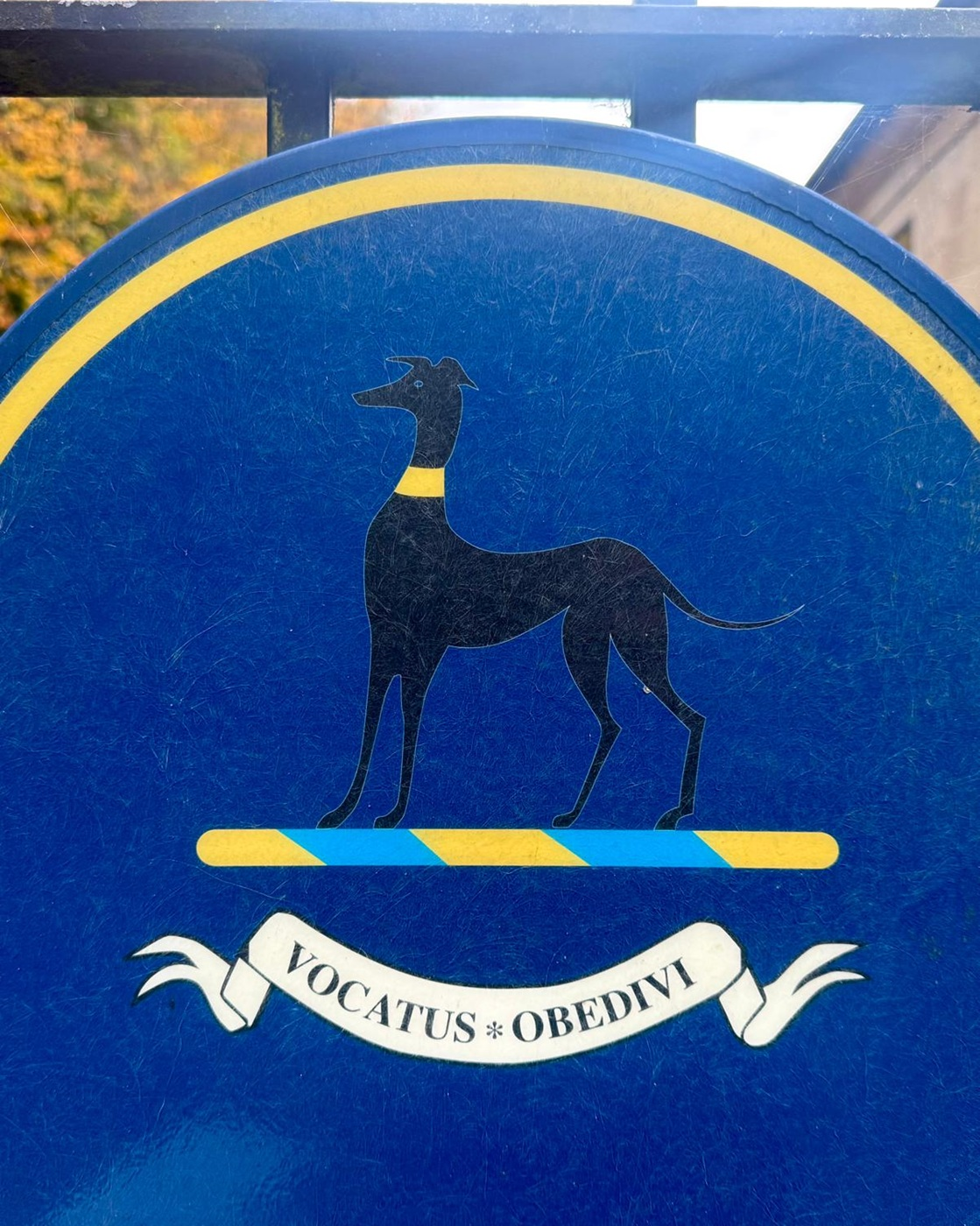
The school badge, based on the Gell family crest

Carsington and Hopton are served by the Carsington and Hopton Church Primary School, a Grade II listed Church of England primary school. Established in 1726 by the Gell family, it retains links to Hopton Hall. The school uses the Gell family crest as its logo.

A plaque on the school wall states: "This School was Built and Given by Mrs Temperance Gell, of Hopton. For Twenty poor Children of Hopton and Carson; To Learn to Read, Write, and other proper Works. Anno Dom: 1726". As of 2025, the school's most recent Ofsted inspection was graded as 'Good', serving 36 pupils with 22.2% eligible for free school meals.

Secondary and sixth-form education is provided by Queen Elizabeth's Grammar School in Ashbourne and Anthony Gell School in Wirksworth. Anthony Gell School was established by Anthony Gell, a resident of Hopton Hall, in 1576 under the name "The Free Grammar School of Anthony Gell Esq.". It was granted a royal charter by Queen Elizabeth on 27 October 1584, declaring a "grammar school in Wirksworth for ever, endowed by Anthony Gell."

== See also ==
- Listed buildings in Carsington
