= Bill Thomas (businessman) =

British businessman (born 1959)

Sir Bill Thomas
- Born: November 1959 (age 66); United Kingdom
- Education: University of Leeds, Brunel University London, and Cranfield School of Management
- Occupation: Businessman
- Parent(s): Jack and Hetty Thomas

Sir William Gennydd Thomas (born 1959) is a British businessman who was a business executive at Electronic Data Systems (EDS) for 25 years. His responsibilities at EDS included delivery of major UK Government IT systems. In 2003, he gave evidence to the House of Commons of the United Kingdom Public Accounts Committee after an error during the rollout of a £168m contract relating to the Inland Revenue.

When EDS was acquired by Hewlett Packard (HP) in 2003 Thomas became general manager for HP's Europe Middle East and Africa (EMEA) division. He remained in that role until 2009.

== Early life and education ==
Born in 1959, Thomas is the son of Jack Thomas, a deputy headteacher, and his wife Hetty. He grew up in Colne, where he attended primary school; he was then educated at St Theodore's Comprehensive School in Burnley before completing his undergraduate education at the University of Leeds; he graduated with a BSc in mathematics. Thomas went on to complete an MSc in digital systems at Brunel University and an MBA from the Cranfield School of Management.

== Career ==
Thomas began his career working in radar development at Marconi, before joining the US-based IT services company Electronic Data Systems (EDS); he remained there for 25 years until the end of 2008, during which time the company heavily expanded its presence in the UK. Initially recruited to work in its manufacturing division, Thomas eventually became head of the company's division in Europe, the Middle East and Africa (EMEA).

He served as the regional vice-president from September 2000 to January 2003, the vice-president and general area manager for EMEA from January 2003 to December 2006, and the executive vice-president for the same region from December 2006 to December 2008. During this time, EDS held several major public-sector contracts for IT work in the UK; by 2007, it was the largest IT contractor for the UK government.

He gave evidence to the House of Commons Public Accounts Committee in 2003 after an error during the rollout of a £168m contract relating to the administration of the Inland Revenue's Tax Credits system temporarily left hundreds of thousands of people unable to receive Tax Credits.

Following EDS's takeover by Hewlett-Packard in August 2008, Thomas became HP's senior vice-president and general manager for the EMEA division; he remained in that role until December 2009.

Since leaving EDS and HP, Thomas has been appointed to the boards of directors of several companies: GFI Software (since 2011), Xchanging (2011–16), Balfour Beatty (2013–14) and The Co-Operative Bank (since 2013); he joined the board of Spirent Communications in 2016 and has served as its chairman since 2017.

He is also chairman of Node4 Holdings Ltd (since 2017) and of Clarkson plc (since 2019). Thomas has also been chair of the Royal Navy and Royal Marines Charity and has been an advisor to the Labour Party on issues of defence, vocational education, business policy and the awarding of public-sector contracts to small- and medium-sized businesses. He was knighted in the 2020 New Year Honours for "charitable and political service".

Later, he lived at Hopton Hall, in Hopton, Derbyshire for a time.
