= Gell baronets =

Extinct baronetcy in the Baronetage of England

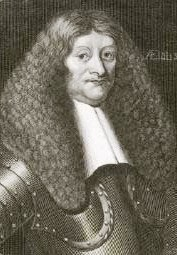
Sir John Gell, 1st Baronet

The Gell Baronetcy of Hopton in the County of Derby, was a title in the Baronetage of England. It was created on 29 January 1642 for John Gell, Hopton Hall, Derbyshire, chief barmaster in the wapentake of Wirksworth from 1638–1644. The family gained importance and wealth through lead mining interests near Wirksworth. Sir John Gell, 1st Baronet received the baronetcy on the eve of the English Civil War, but fought for the Parliamentary side.

The Gells lost much of their financial wealth and were left in debt at the 1660 restoration of the monarchy, from previous expenditure 'agitating for Parliament', then in 1661 they lost important local mineral rights, forcing the family to borrow large sums of money, sell off land and lead mines, and controversially 'enclose' - seize and fence off - nearby common land in Carsington and Wirksworth, to use as collateral for more loans, which led to ongoing dispute with neighbours. By 1708 3rd baronet Philip Gell had the estate debt free, but two years later defaulted on another loan which took until 1718 to clear, one year before his death.

The 2nd and 3rd Baronets both served as Members of Parliament for Derbyshire, a privilege of the gentry, though by 1690 the Gell's staunch Presbyterianism religion was at odds with Anglican voters, and 3rd baronet Philip lasted only a year as MP. The male line of the family became extinct on the decease of the Philip in 1719, but his nephew John Eyre Gell (died 1739) took the name of Gell upon inheriting the estate - His son, Philip Eyre Gell (1723–1795) may have built the Via Gellia to serve the family lead mines, while another son, John Gell (1740–1806), became an admiral. Philip Eyre Gell had two sons, Philip Gell (1775–1842), who inherited the estate, and Sir William Gell (1777–1836), an antiquarian. Philip was succeeded by daughter Isabella, who died in 1878, thus ending the line.

The Via Gellia, a wooded valley road running from Wirksworth, was named after the Gell family, in mock Latin style. It is most likely that it was named after, or possibly by, Philip Eyre Gell who was ultimately responsible for its construction.

== Gell baronets, of Hopton (1642) ==
- Sir John Gell, 1st Baronet (1592–1671)
- Sir John Gell, 2nd Baronet (1612–1689)
- Sir Philip Gell, 3rd Baronet (1651–1719)

== Descendants ==
Notable descendants of the Gell family of Hopton Hall:

- Philip Eyre Gell (1723–1795). High Sheriff of Derbyshire in 1755. Son of John (Eyre) Gell (nephew of the 3rd Baronet).
- Admiral John Gell (1740–1806), commander in the Royal Navy. Brother of Philip Eyre Gell.
- Philip Gell MP (1775–1842), politician and High Sheriff of Derbyshire in 1822. Son of Philip Eyre Gell.
- Sir William Gell FRS (1777–1836), archaeologist. Son of Philip Eyre Gell.
- Reverend John Philip Gell (1816–1898), married Eleanor Isabella Franklin (daughter of Arctic explorer Sir John Franklin). Descendant of Ralph Gell (1491–1564), grandfather of the 1st baronet, who originally acquired the Hopton estate in 1553.
- Philip Lyttleton Gell (1852–1926), editor for Oxford University Press. Son of Reverend John Philip Gell.

== See also ==
- Anthony Gell (1522–1583)
