= Carsington Roman Villa =

Roman villa in Derbyshire, England

Coordinates: 53°03′41″N 1°37′47″W

The Carsington Roman Villa is a Roman villa at Scow Brook, Carsington near Wirksworth, Derbyshire, England.

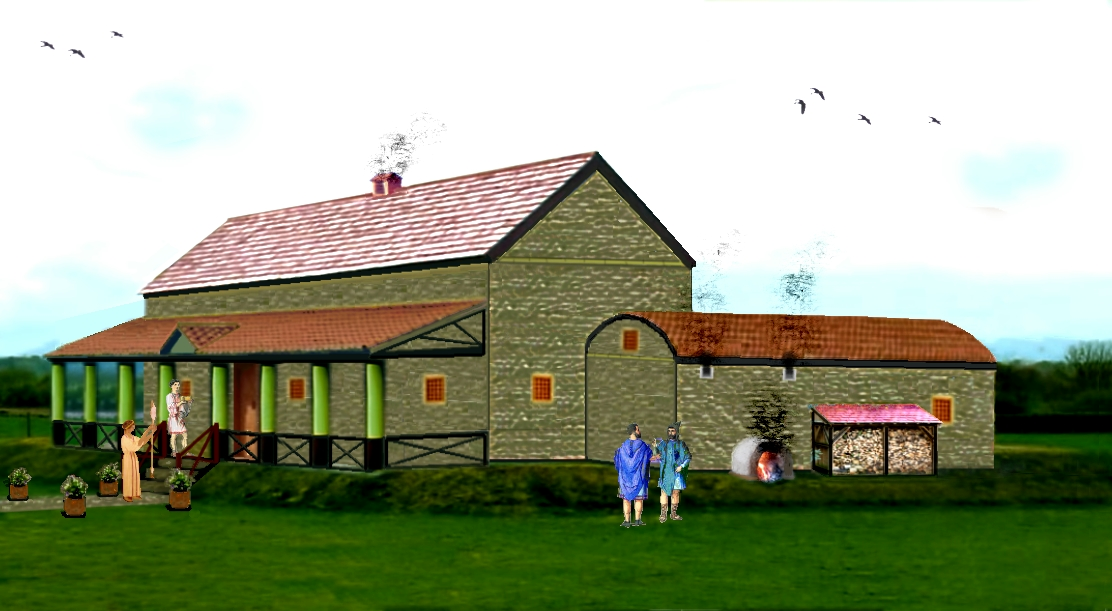
An artist's impression of the villa at Carsington by Wirksworth

The site of the villa is currently submerged under the Carsington Water reservoir. Before the reservoir was built, the villa would have been located along the upper valley of the Scow Brook.

== Floor plan of the villa ==
The villa contains a main house, a bathhouse, a courtyard, and a number of outbuildings. The main house is 28 meters long by 9 meters wide, forming an area of 252 square meters (around three times the size of a modern house). The bathhouse, attached to the south-east corner of the main house, is 13.5 meters long and 4 meters wide, adding another 54 square meters to the structure. The villa was built on a platform raised above the surrounding fields, presumably to keep it dry. The main house has a verandah on the west side which would catch the evening sun in the summer.

== Construction ==
The villa was constructed from sandstone and gritstone. The sandstone may have been quarried nearby at Warrington Knob, where archaeologists reported a small, disused quarry. Gritstone (millstone grit) could have been obtained from the south side of Pitty Wood, which is about 1.5 km south-west of Wirksworth. This would give it the appearance of a large stone-built Derbyshire barn or farmhouse but with crucial differences: The villa had a verandah on its main west frontage. It had small Roman windows (window glass was found in the excavations) with shutters, and the main house had a pink shiny stone slate roof composed of mica sandstone from a quarry at Wyver Wood at Belper Lane End. The roof would have glittered in the sunlight, making it stand out against the green landscape. The bathhouse and verandah's orange, pantile roofs were composed of Roman imbrex (curved) tiles and tegula (flat) under tiles.

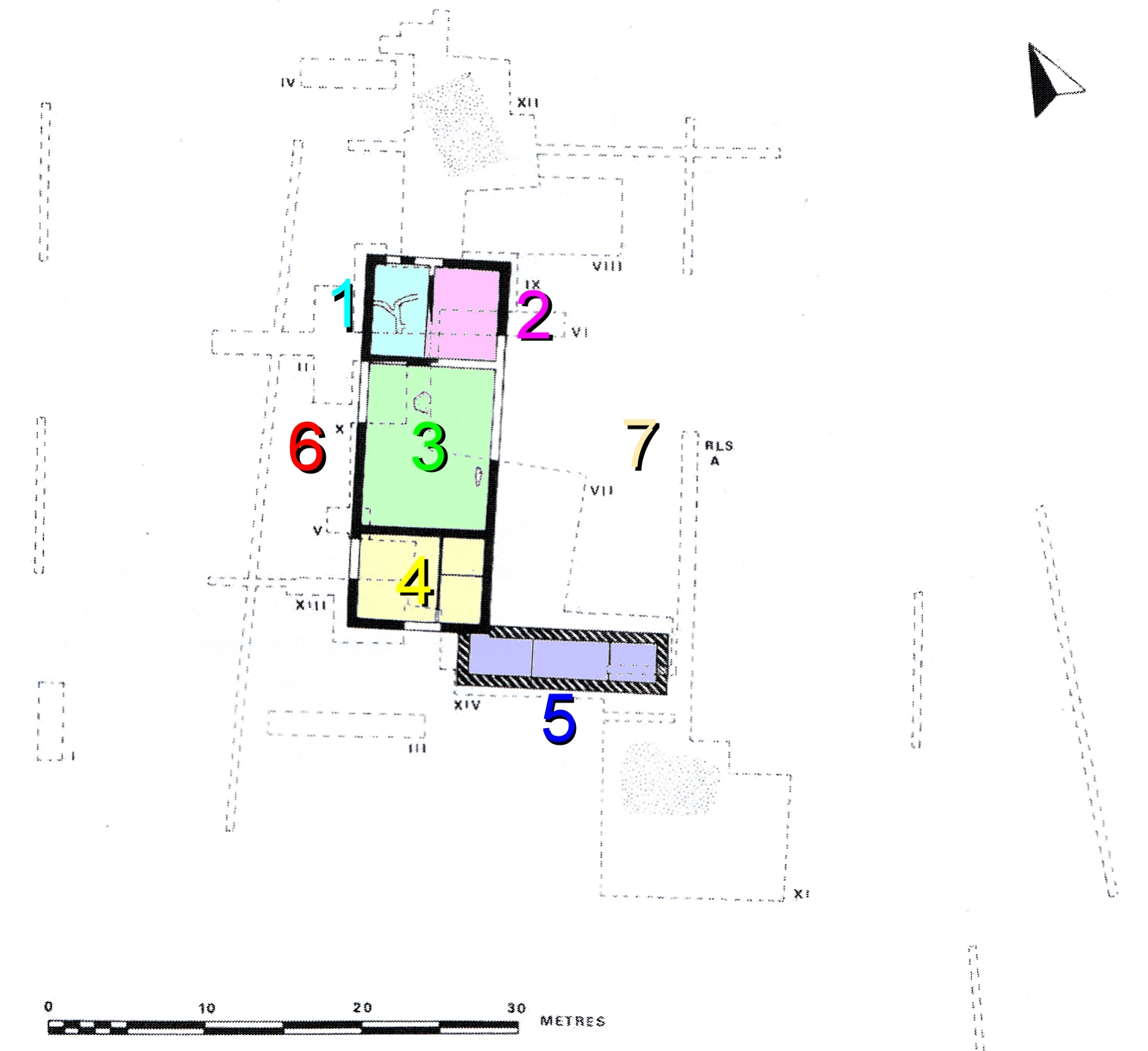
The floorplan and room layout. Ling and Courtney (1981) developed the excavation plan showing the basic layout of the building.

== Rooms and features ==
The main building consisted of the following rooms and features:

1. At the north end of the building, there was a room with a hypocaust (i.e. a source of central heating) on the west side. This room may have been a dining room or study (most of the early Romans could read and write).

2. On the east side of the north end, there was a small unit which was most likely a utility, store, or servants room. It was quite large but had no distinct or unusual features in the excavation.

3. The main hall. This was the main living room of the villa and had two hearths, a large one and a smaller one. These were probably used for cooking/heating; braziers were also used for heating. The main door from this room would have opened onto the verandah on the west side, and there was presumably a back door opening on to the courtyard on the east side. Roman buildings did not usually have chimneys. However, there would have been a louver or roof vent to let the hearth smoke out of the building. The windows were also fitted with louvers or shutters over the glass. There was no mosaic at this villa, but two types of colored tile were found during the excavations, suggesting the building may have had a patterned floor.

4. The bedrooms. At the south end, there was a part of the main building, which was split into one large and two smaller partitioned areas, these appear to have been the bedrooms. Bedrooms in Roman or medieval buildings tend to be at the south side or south-east corners as this is where there is the most heat gain from the sun in the morning.

5. The bathhouse is attached to the south-east corner of the building, but not directly accessible from the main house, due to risk of fire outbreak from the furnace that heated the bath. Roman bathhouses are often detached or semi-detached for this reason. There were three rooms in this building, at the east end a changing room, in the middle a heated room (a place for drying off after a bath) and at the west end the bath itself. The bath was heated by a wood-burning furnace. The furnace would provide heat for the hypocaust (a similar furnace must have existed at the north end) and would have been underneath a copper or iron tank rather like the modern immersion heater. The hot air from the furnace would heat the tank and then pass into the hypocaust to heat the floor and then up through box flues in the walls to heat the walls, being vented under the eaves through vent tiles. Next to the furnace is the wood store. The furnace could have used wood or charcoal, but wood is much easier to obtain and would have been preferred.

6. The verandah, located on the west side of the main house, would have provided some shelter from bad weather and a place to sit and talk or do small tasks in good weather. The verandah had a clay and pebble floor, and if this was indeed the main frontage of the villa, it might have had a garden and the approach road on that side. The Romans were knowledgeable gardeners, and the garden would have provided a source of food, cookery, and medicinal items.

7. The courtyard was on the east side of the building, which somewhat sheltered it from the prevailing wind. There were at least two outbuildings; it is likely that these were a stable, and cart house, and one or more storehouses. These were on opposite sides of the courtyard so that the complete villa footprint would have been rather U-shaped looking at it from the east.

== Dating the site and the end of the villa ==
From the dating evidence, including Derbyshire ware pottery and Samian ware, found during the excavation, it is assumed that the villa existed between 300AD and 400AD. Some of the coins found nearby were from the 380s, for example. It is assumed that the villa superseded an earlier timber structure. The archaeologists felt there were no signs of a catastrophic or sudden end to life in the villa. There was no sign of fire or disaster. The interior was described as surprisingly clean as if the house had been tidied up, the doors locked and the occupants had quietly left. The villa appears to have had a slow, gentle decline and gradually became a ruin: by 500AD, it was gone. It remained in a grassy field undiscovered until 1964.
