= Philip Lyttelton Gell =

British newspaper editor

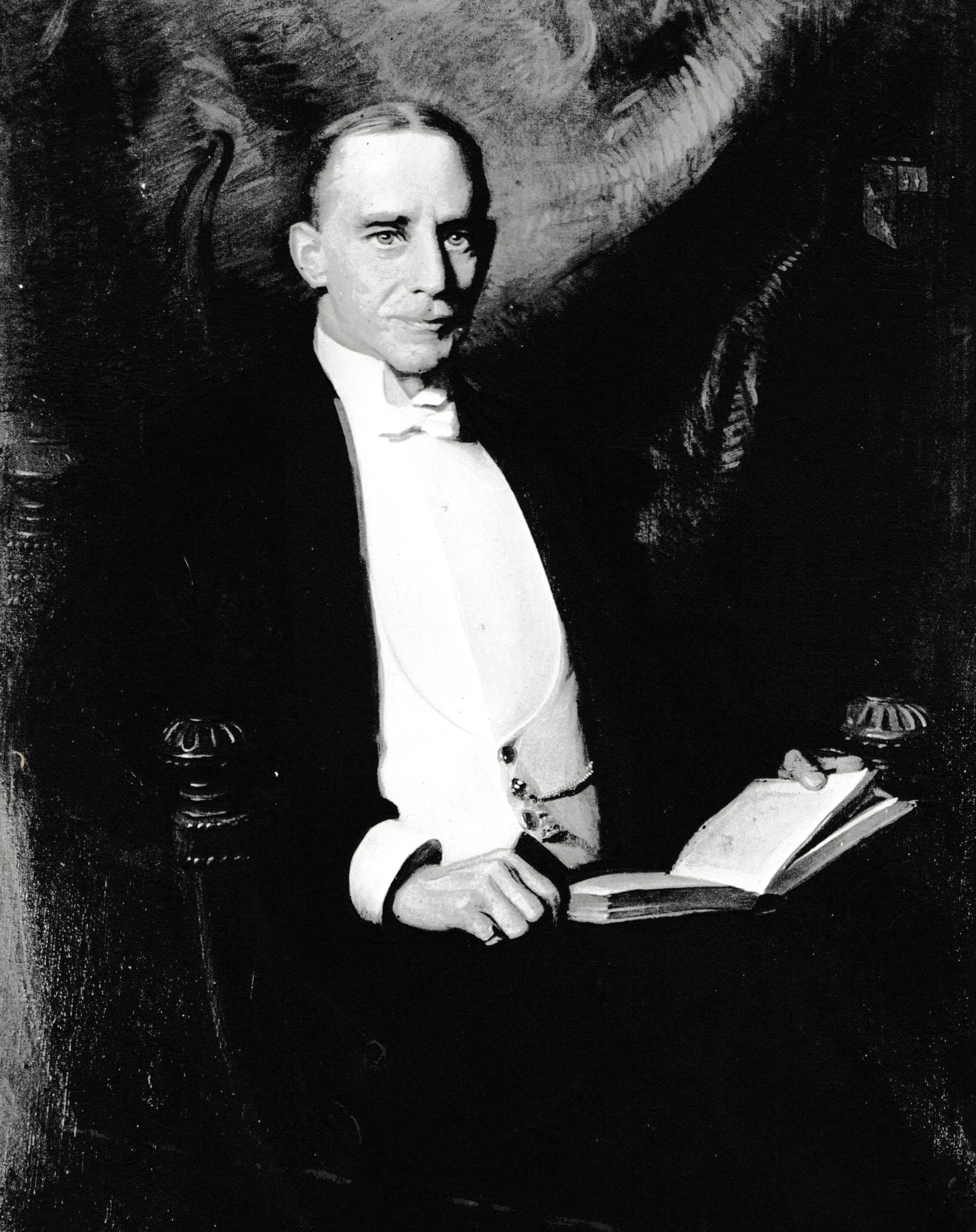
Portrait of Philip Lyttelton Gell (1852–1926)

Philip Lyttelton Gell (1852–1926) was a British editor for Oxford University Press between 1884 and 1896 and President of the British South Africa Company between 1920 and 1923. He was born in London, later acquiring to the Gell family seat, Hopton Hall in Hopton, Derbyshire, in 1908.

Lyttelton Gell was a friend of Alfred Lord Milner, and corresponded frequently with Henry Birchenough and other board members of the British South Africa Company. The Derbyshire Record Office contains correspondence relating to Gell's involvement with the BSAC as Director (1899–1917, 1923–1925), Chairman (1917–1920) and President (1920–1923).

He was Chairman of Toynbee Hall, Whitechapel, from 1884 to 1896. Through his mother, he was the grandson of Admiral John Franklin. He supported the co-operative movement and the Liberal Unionist Party, and was a literary executor of Benjamin Jowett (1817–1893), Master of Balliol College, Oxford.

The part of Philip Lyttelton Gell was played by Laurence Fox in the 2019 film The Professor and the Madman, with Mel Gibson in the role of Dictionary Murray.

== Early life ==
Philip studied at King’s College School in London as a day pupil where he met Alfred Milner. They both secured scholarships to Balliol College, Oxford and arrived in the early 1870s. In 1876 Philip received first class honours in History, and the following year won the Toynbee Essay Prize for a dissertation entitled ‘The Turkish Races in Europe’. While at Oxford Philip developed friendships with Arnold Toynbee and Benjamin Jowett.
