= Listed buildings in Hopton, Derbyshire =

Hopton is a civil parish in the Derbyshire Dales district of Derbyshire, England. The parish contains 21 listed buildings that are recorded in the National Heritage List for England. All the listed buildings are designated at Grade II, the lowest of the three grades, which is applied to "buildings of national importance and special interest". The parish contains the village of Hopton and the surrounding countryside. Most of the listed buildings are houses, cottages and associated structures, farmhouses and farm buildings. The other listed buildings include a guide post, a row of almshouses, the base of a former windmill, a well, and a railway bridge.

== Buildings ==
Name and location	Photograph	Date	Notes
Hopton Hall; 53.07568°N 1.61943°W		16th century	A country house that was refashioned in the 18th century, it is mainly in red brick with gritstone dressings, it has a gritstone rear wing, and a slate roof with parapets and coped gables. There are three storeys, an E-shaped plan, and a front of seven bays, the middle three bays projecting. In the centre is an embattled porch with a four-centred arch, and a doorway with pilasters and a decorative fanlight. The windows on the front are sashes. To the west is a three-storey tower with mullioned windows, and an elongated pyramidal roof with an elaborate metal finial. In the north range is a doorway with a rusticated surround and a dated lintel, above which are cartouches. The garden front contains a wide two-storey bay window with a segmental pediment that is flanked by gabled bays, each with a Venetian window, and a Diocletian window above.
Hopton Manor; 53.07576°N 1.61437°W	—	17th century	The farmhouse is in gritstone with a tile roof. There are two storeys and attics, an irregular front, and a single-storey bay to the south. The doorway has a quoined and moulded surround, and a four-centred arched lintel, and the windows are mullioned. Inside, there is a remnant of a cruck truss in the upper floor.
Townend Hall; 53.07604°N 1.61231°W	—	Mid 17th century	The house, which was refashioned in the 18th century, is in gritstone and has a tile roof with coped gables and kneelers. There are three storeys, and a T-shaped plan, consisting of a main range and a recessed 18th-century wing. On the gable end facing the road is a re-set medieval carving of a beast, and in the wing is a doorway with a massively quoined surround. Over the doorway is a single-light casement window, and the other windows are mullioned.
Tudor Cottage; 53.07615°N 1.61128°W	—	17th century	The cottage, which was later altered, is in limestone and gritstone, with gritstone dressings and a tile roof. There are two storeys and an L-shaped plan. The windows are mullioned with three lights and hood moulds.
Guide post 53.07786°N 1.60313°W		1705	The guide post is a gritstone pillar about 3 feet (0.91 m) high. It is inscribed on all sides with the date, and the names of the surrounding towns, some abbreviated. On the north side is a benchmark.
Gell Almshouses; 53.07606°N 1.61168°W		1719–22	The four almshouses are in limestone with gritstone dressings, a string course, a moulded cornice, and a stone slate roof with coped gables and moulded kneelers. There is a single storey and eight bays, the middle two bays projecting under a gable containing an inscribed plaque with a coat of arms. The doorways have large jambs and lintels, and the windows are mullioned, each containing two small-paned casements.
Wall and gate piers, Hopton Manor; 53.07585°N 1.61409°W	—	18th century	The wall is in limestone with gritstone dressings, about 7 feet (2.1 m) high, with moulded copings, and containing two blocked oval panels. To the west is a pair of square gate piers that are cut away in a curve above the wall to form smaller piers with moulded cappings.
Woodbank; 53.07644°N 1.61053°W		18th century (probable)	A stone house with a tile roof and two storeys. The south front has three bays, the middle bay a large semicircular projection containing windows with pointed heads and Gothic tracery. The outer bays contain casement windows, and on the west front is a central porch and sash windows.
Garden walls and tower, Hopton Hall; 53.07659°N 1.61829°W		Late 18th century	The garden walls and tower are in red brick with vitrified headers and gritstone dressings. The walls are forcing walls in segmental curved sections about 10 feet (3.0 m) high, with moulded stone copings. The central tower, originally a dovecote, has a square plan, two storeys, a moulded stone cornice, and a slate pyramidal roof with a small square top. In the south front are two sets of double doors with fanlights containing Gothic tracery, and the upper floor contains blocked pigeon holes.
Stable block, Hopton Hall; 53.07574°N 1.62020°W	—	Late 18th century	The block, originally a laundry, stable and outbuildings, has been partly converted into dwellings. It is in red brick with gritstone dressings and roofs in slate and stone slate, and it forms four ranges around a courtyard. The north range has a single storey and the others have two. In the south range is a clock tower with a circular face on each side, and four round-headed arches with quoined surrounds. In the northeast corner is a Venetian window, and elsewhere are casement windows and horizontally-sliding sashes.
Steps and gates to vegetable garden, Hopton Hall; 53.07608°N 1.61824°W	—	Late 18th century	The piers and steps are in gritstone. There are eleven steps, 6 feet (1.8 m) wide. At the top is a pair of circular pillars, each with a frieze of fluted and gabled decoration, a moulded cornice and a ball finial. At the base of the steps are the remains of a similar pair.
Ice house 53.07684°N 1.61720°W	—	Late 18th century	The ice house is in gritstone, and is circular with a domed roof. Halfway up is a short access passage, and its overall depth is 7.5 metres (25 ft).
Sycamore Farmhouse; 53.07814°N 1.60320°W	—	Late 18th century	The farmhouse is in red brick, with a front of vitrified headers and gritstone dressings, side walls in gritstone, and a tile roof with coped gables and moulded kneelers. There are two storeys and attics, and three bays. On the south front is a central bow window containing a Venetian window, and in the side bays are mullioned windows, each containing two small-paned cacsements. The bow window has a moulded cornice, and elsewhere are sawtooth and dentilled cornices.
Piggery, Sycamore Farmhouse; 53.07811°N 1.60290°W	—	Late 18th century	The piggery to the east of the farmhouse is in gritstone, with a projecting eaves band and a tile roof. It is a low single-storey building containing two doors, and to the west is a wall enclosing an area containing stone feeding troughs.
The Lodge; 53.07643°N 1.61694°W	—	Late 18th century	The lodge is in red brick, with gritstone dressings, and a tile roof with overhanging eaves. There are two storeys, in the front facing the road is a doorway and a wooden decorated ogee porch with a finial, and to the right are sash windows.
Gate piers west of The Lodge; 53.07644°N 1.61686°W	—	Late 18th century	The gate piers flanking the entrance to the drive are in gritstone. They have a square plan, and are about 8 feet (2.4 m) high. Each pier has a frieze with swag decoration on the north side, and a moulded pediment.
Windmill; 53.08688°N 1.62549°W		Late 18th century	The base of the former windmill is in limestone with gritstone dressings. It consists of a circular tower with a capping band, but no cap. To the north is a blocked doorcase with a massive lintel, and there are various square window openings.
Dene Cottage; 53.07658°N 1.61647°W		Late 18th to early 19th century	Originally a toll house, the cottage is in gritstone, and has a tile roof with coped gables and moulded kneelers. The cottage is canted to the curve of the road, and has a single storey facing the road and two storeys to the northwest. The windows are casements, on the south gable wall is a porch, and on the front facing the road is a blocked doorway with an ogee head.
Cartshed, Home Farm; 53.07559°N 1.61652°W	—	Late 18th to early 19th century	The cartshed is in gritstone with quoins, a chamfered eaves band, and a slate roof with coped gables and kneelers. There are two storeys and four bays. The cartshed contains four semicircular-headed arches with keystones, one rising through both storeys, the others with imposts. In the upper floor are three semicircular openings with keystones, later blocked.
Well; 53.07578°N 1.61526°W	—	Early 19th century	The well is in limestone, and has a semicircular arch about 6 feet (1.8 m) high, with rusticated piers, rectangular imposts, and a projecting keystone. Inside, there is a semicircular niche.
Railway bridge 53.08844°N 1.61046°W		1826	The bridge was built by the Cromford and High Peak Railway to carry its line over a road. It is in limestone, and consists of a single large arch. The bridge has a string course, a parapet, and end pilasters, and on each side are limestone embankments. On the bridge are two inscribed stones.
