= Philip Gell (1775–1842) =

British Whig politician

- Born: 1775; Hopton, Derbyshire
- Died: 1842 (aged 66–67)
- Political party: Whig
- Spouse: Georgiana Nicholas
- Parent(s): Philip Eyre Gell and Dorothy (née Milnes)

Philip Gell (1775–1842) was a British Whig politician. Gell was a quiet MP who bought his constituency. He was the High Sheriff of Derbyshire in 1822. He was born at Hopton Hall in Hopton, Derbyshire.

== Biography ==
Gell was the son of Philip Eyre Gell and Dorothy (née Milnes) of Hopton Hall. He was educated at Manchester Grammar School. In 1797 he married Georgiana Nicholas.

Gell was offered a position as Member of Parliament for Malmesbury which he bought for £4,000. He was returned in 1807 for Malmesbury. In 1812 he was elected for Penryn. There is no record of any speeches he made whilst serving for either Malmesbury or for Penryn.

In 1822 he was the High Sheriff of Derbyshire. Gell died in 1842 and left his estate to his only living child, Isabella, the wife of William Pole Thornhill.

Parliament of the United Kingdom
Preceded by Robert Ladbroke; Nicholas Ridley-Colborne	Member of Parliament for Malmesbury; 1807 – 1812; With: Sir George Bowyer 1807–1810; Abel Smith 1810–1812	Succeeded by William Hicks-Beach; Sir Charles Saxton, Bt
Preceded by Charles Lemon; Henry Swann	Member of Parliament for Penryn; 1812 – 1818; With: Henry Swann	Succeeded by Sir Christopher Hawkins, Bt; Henry Swann
Honorary titles
Preceded by Sir George Harpur Crewe	High Sheriff of Derbyshire; 1822	Succeeded by Thomas Bateman (Sheriff)
