= Anthony Gell =

Gell, Anthony (d. 1583), law reporter

- Born: about 1522; Hopton Hall, Hopton, Derbyshire
- Died: June 29, 1583 (aged 60–61)
- Resting place: St Mary's Church, Wirksworth
- Occupations: Barrister and law reporter
- Years active: 1545–1583

Anthony Gell was a law reporter active in the reigns of Edward VI to Elizabeth I.

== Life ==
He was born at Hopton Hall, in Hopton, Derbyshire to Ralph and Godeth Gell in around 1522. He studied at Clement's Inn in the early 1540s, and as a young student in London, he witnessed a sermon by the famous preacher Hugh Latimer.

In 1545, he was appointed principal of Clement's Inn, and shortly afterwards was called to the bar at the Inner Temple. He wrote a series of law reports, one of which survives at the Library of Congress and another at the Derbyshire Record Office. He was appointed a bencher of the Inner Temple in 1559. He accumulated much wealth as an attorney, some of which he used to endow the grammar school at Wirksworth, now known as Anthony Gell School. He was granted arms in 1575: Per bend Azure and Or three mullets of six points in bend pierced and counter changed. He died, unmarried and childless, on 29 June 1583 and was buried in St Mary's Church, Wirksworth, where his effigy may still be seen.

== See also ==
- Gell baronets
