= Oliver Smith (politician) =

British politician (born 1993)

- In office 1 January 2006 – 1 January 2007
- Preceded by: Keith Falconbridge
- Succeeded by: Keith Falconbridge
- Majority: Unanimous (100%)

Personal details
- Born: 20 February 1993 (age 33)
- Party: Liberal Democrats
- Education: Lincoln College, Oxford

Oliver Smith (born 20 February 1993) is a student politician from Crich, Derbyshire in the United Kingdom who was appointed president of the Amber Valley branch of the Liberal Democrats for the year 2006. He was elected unopposed as the president at the November 2005 Annual General Meeting of the branch, of which he has been a member since he was eight, and took up the one-year post on 1 January 2006 when he was just 12 years, 9 months and 13 days old, making him the youngest branch party president in British political history. His mother, Kate Smith, is the membership officer for the Amber Valley Liberal Democrats and was twice unsuccessful in the 2001 general election and 2005 general election. Oliver Smith succeeded 55-year-old Keith Falconbridge, who became chairman. Keith Falconbridge succeeded Oliver in 2007.

Smith's campaign points, in 2006, included the lowering of the voting age from 18 to 16 and the abolition of university tuition fees. He also wanted to see Tony Blair and Gordon Brown out of office, while he supported Charles Kennedy.

Smith was a pupil at Anthony Gell School, the school that Ellen McArthur attended. and went on to study History at Lincoln College, Oxford University.
