= Henmore Brook =

Henmore Brook River Henmore
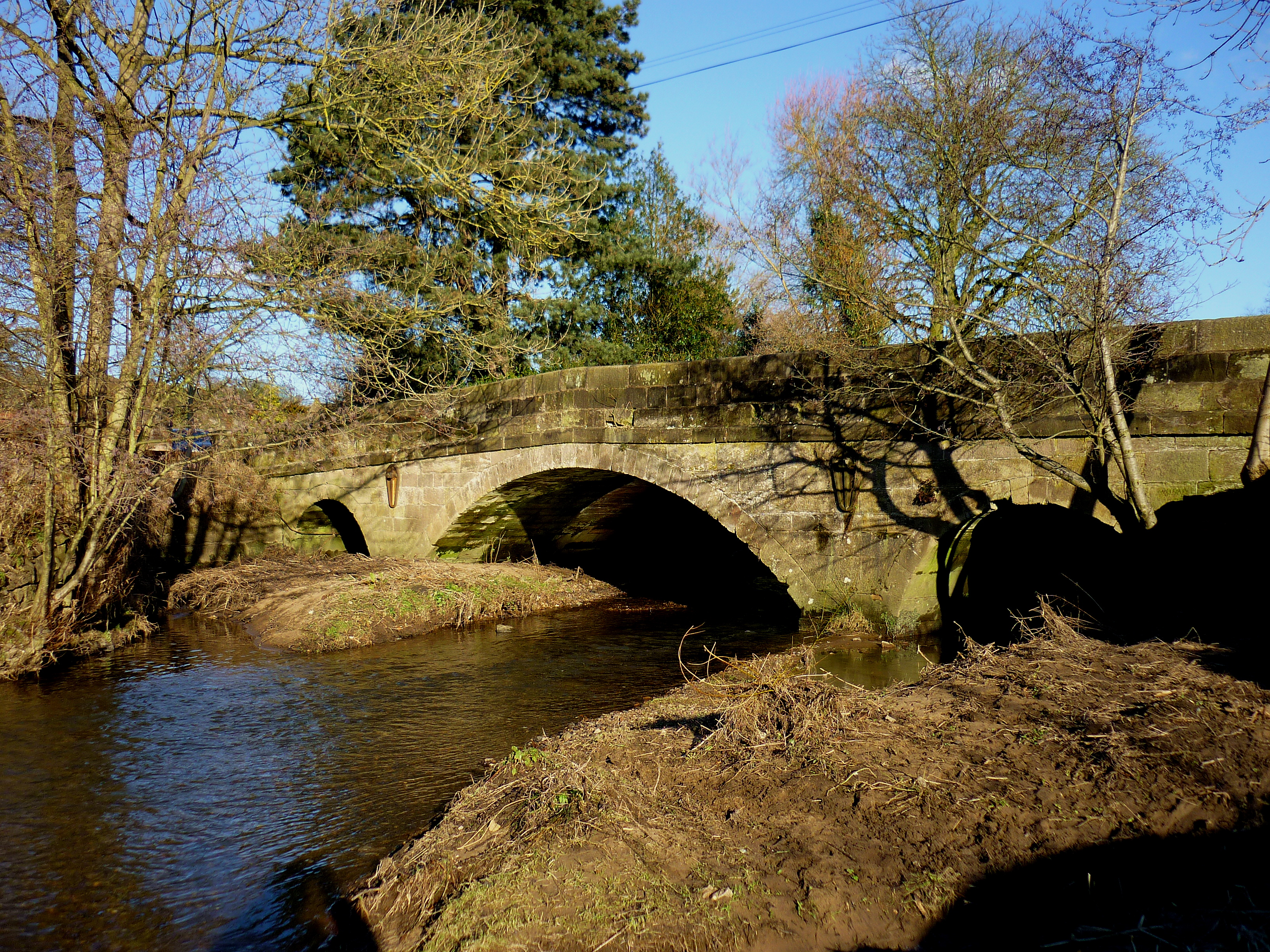
- Ashbourne, Derbyshire

- Mouth shown in Derbyshire

Location
- Country: England
- Counties: Derbyshire

Physical characteristics
- Source: Stainsborough Hall
  - location: Hopton, Derbyshire
- Mouth: Confluence with the River Dove
  - location: Church Mayfield, Staffordshire
  - coordinates: 52°59′57″N 1°45′46″W
- Length: 20 km (12 mi)
- Basin size: 46 km^{2} (18 sq mi)
- Discharge
  - location: Ashbourne
  - average: 0.43 m^{3}/s (15 cu ft/s)
  - maximum: 33.7 m^{3}/s (1,190 cu ft/s)

Basin features
- Tributaries
  - left: Dayfield Brook
  - right: Kniveton Brook, Parkside Brook

The Henmore Brook or the River Henmore is a tributary of the River Dove in Derbyshire, England, and is 20 km (12 miles) in length.

In its upper reaches it is known as the Scow brook, much of which was inundated by the Carsington Water reservoir in 1991. It becomes the Henmore brook in the middle reaches, where there are three tributaries called the Parkside, Kniveton and Dayfield brooks.

The brook drains a catchment of mixed geology, which has an area of 46 square kilometres (18 square miles). It flows through the market town of Ashbourne, where flooding of the town centre by the brook has historically caused significant damage. The brook is designated as a Main river by the Environment Agency from the outflow at Carsington Water to the confluence with the River Dove.

== Course ==
The source of the brook is at the base of Soldiers Knoll near Stainsborough Hall, from where it flows west until it reaches the upper end of Carsington Water near Hopton. It reappears at the outlet of the dam, and flows in a south-westerly direction past the villages of Hognaston, Atlow, and Sturston until it reaches the town of Ashbourne. Downstream of the town it passes the village of Clifton before reaching its confluence with the River Dove at Church Mayfield.

== History ==
There has been a long history of human presence and settlement in the Henmore valley, with many Palaeolithic sites both in the north near Carsington, with round barrows and standing stones, and other tumuli in the sandstone hills south of Ashbourne. A rare Acheulean stone axe was found at Hopton.

Early lead mining in the catchment was important enough that a significant Roman settlement was established. This was discovered during archaeological digs that took place beside the Scow Brook prior to the area being inundated by Carsington Water. A Roman lead ingot or 'pig' weighing 69 kg was also discovered nearby in 1946.

Ashbourne or Essenburn (a brook where ash trees grow) was included in the Domesday book, and became an important medieval market town, with the road linking Derby to Manchester crossing the brook in the town. The farming community in the Henmore valley supplied the produce for the markets, such as cheese.

The brook also passes alongside Atlow moat, a well-preserved example of a medieval manor homestead moat and which was once the home of the Atlow family. There was also a substantial corn mill at Atlow driven by the Henmore, but unlike other mills along the brook the buildings have been renovated for modern use.

The Henmore was not employed for cotton spinning during the Industrial Revolution, which is unusual for a Derbyshire brook, although a number of large cotton mills were established at Church Mayfield where the Henmore meets the River Dove. There were, however, at least two corn mills near Ashbourne that were powered by the Henmore brook at Clifton and Sturston. Although subsequently demolished, they have become the goals for the annual Royal Shrovetide Football match.

== Royal Shrovetide Football ==
The Henmore brook, or as it is usually called in reference to the game, the River Henmore, is an integral part of the Ashbourne Shrovetide game of Mob football. It determines which team the player joins or supports, those born north of the Henmore are the Up’Ards and those born to the South are the Down’Ards. It links the two goals at Sturston and Clifton, and often acts as the pitch as well. This was reinforced in 1996 when to make the game more challenging, the two goals were repositioned on the banks of the river, which meant players needed to be in the river to 'goal' the ball.

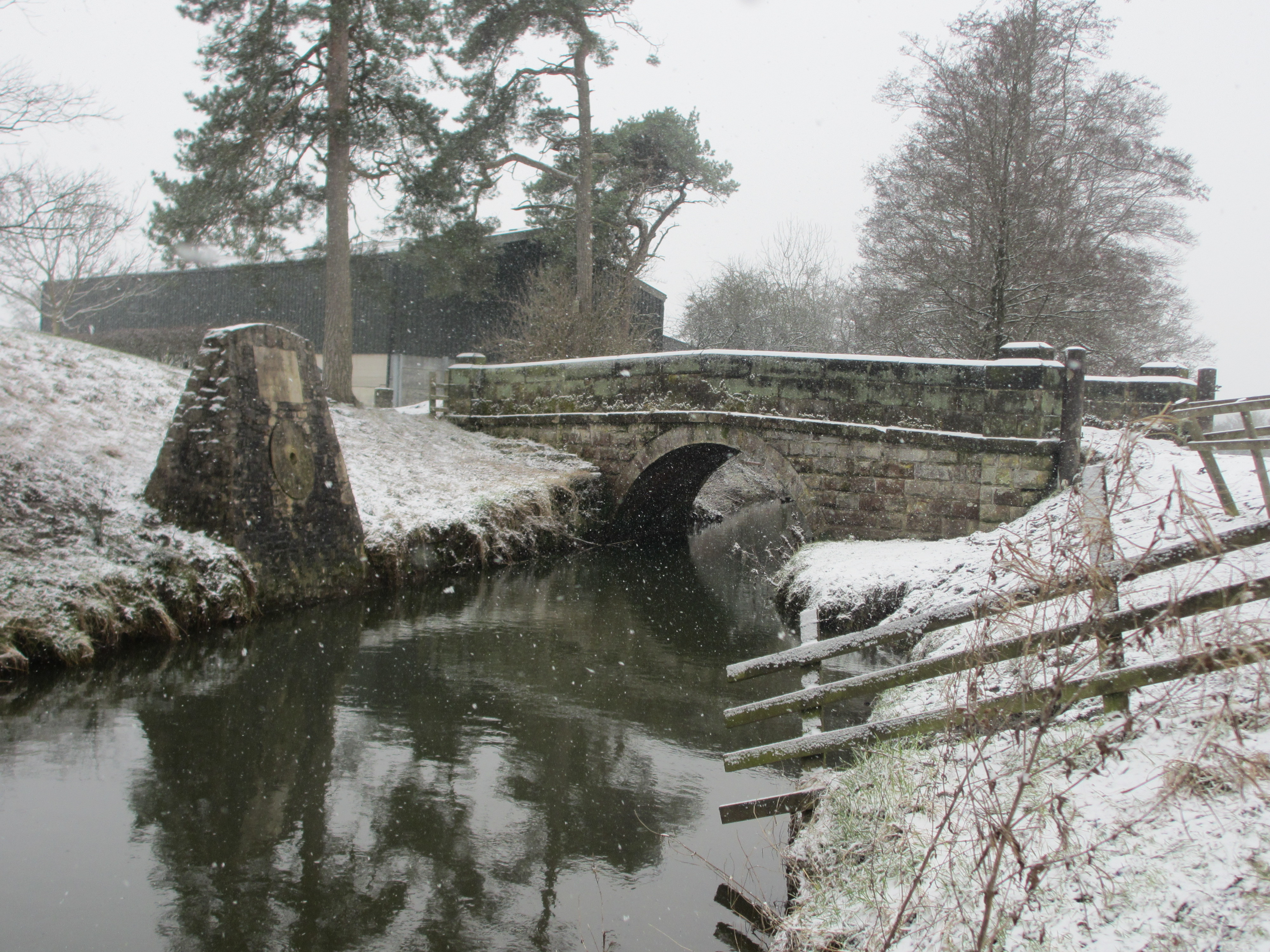
Up'Ards purpose-built goal at Sturston Mill

In 2010, play even continued through the culvert beneath the Civic Square. Once out of the town, the banks of the river provide good viewpoints to observe the match.
