= St Margaret's Church, Carsington =

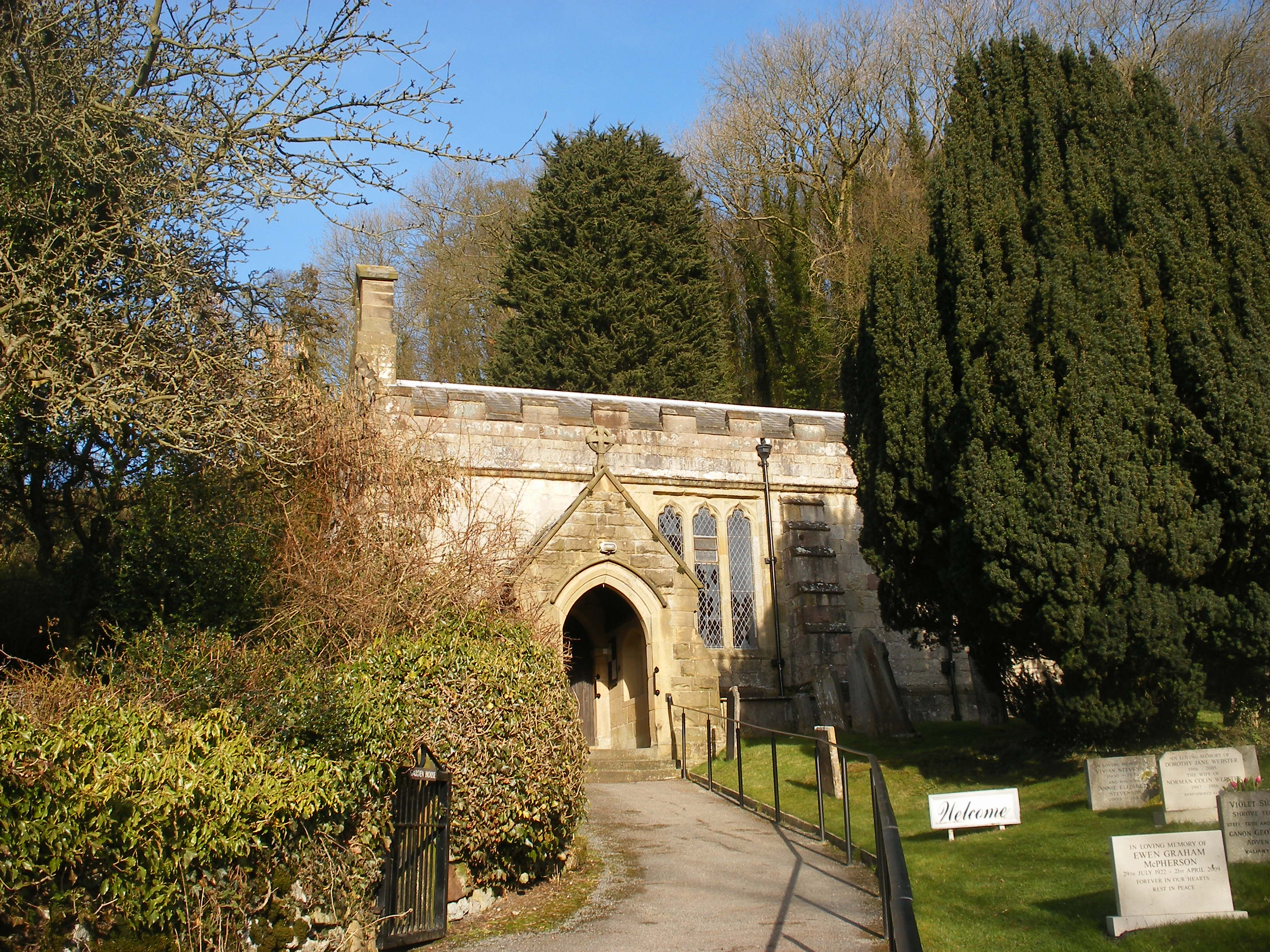
- St Margaret's Church, Carsington
- St Margaret's Church, Carsington
- 53°4′38.69″N 1°37′28.35″W
- OS grid reference: SK 25242 53429
- Location: Carsington, Derbyshire
- Country: England
- Denomination: Church of England

History
- Dedication: St Margaret

Architecture
- Heritage designation: Grade II* listed

Administration
- Province: Canterbury
- Diocese: Derby
- Archdeaconry: Chesterfield
- Deanery: Wirksworth
- Parish: Carsington

St Margaret's Church, Carsington, is a Grade II* listed Anglican parish church in the Church of England in Carsington, Derbyshire.

== History ==
Evidence shows that a church existed as far back as the 12th century, with the present configuration dating from around 1320.

A sundial set into the east wall is inscribed Re-edified 1648. The west end gallery has an inscription This loft was erected at the onely charge of Sir Philp Gell, Baronett. Anno Domini 1704 by consent of the parish at a meeting in Carsington: for the use of his tenants in Hopton.

In 1971, a gravedigger dug up the skeletons of a man, woman and child, probably of Anglo-Saxon origin. This discovery led to further speculation about the date of the first church.

== Parish status ==
St Margaret's is a part of the Dioceses of Derby, and locally grouped within the wider Wirksworth communion group.

- All Saints' Church, Alderwasley
- St James the Apostle's Church, Bonsall
- All Saints' Church, Bradbourne
- St James' Church, Brassington
- All Saints' Church, Elton
- St James' Church, Idridgehay
- Holy Trinity Church, Kirk Ireton
- Holy Trinity Church, Middleton-by-Wirksworth
- St Mary's Church, Wirksworth

== Modern Day ==
The church is open to the public every day for private prayer, and at least once a month for communion. Other services, including morning and afternoon worship happen throughout the month. Additionally, special ceremonies and services for festivals at Easter, Christmas, and harvest rites, Memorial Services on Remembrance Sunday, among others, happen throughout the year.

According to the Church of England's 'Spotlight' on the church and parish, St Margarets serves 300 parishioners.

== Organ ==
The organ was installed in 1932 and was built by Robert Oldacre. A specification of the organ can be found on the National Pipe Organ Register.

== See also ==
- Grade II* listed buildings in Derbyshire Dales
- Listed buildings in Carsington
