= Hognaston =

Village in Derbyshire, England

Coordinates: 53.04°N 1.65°W

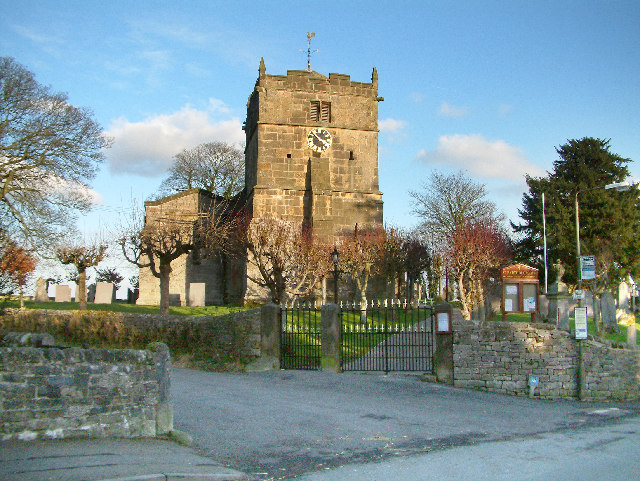
- St Bartholomew's Church

- Location within Derbyshire
- Population: 366 (2011)
- OS grid reference: SK235505
- District: Derbyshire Dales
- Shire county: Derbyshire
- Region: East Midlands
- Country: England
- Sovereign state: United Kingdom
- Post town: ASHBOURNE
- Postcode district: DE6
- Dialling code: 01335
- Police: Derbyshire
- Fire: Derbyshire
- Ambulance: East Midlands
- UK Parliament: Derbyshire Dales

Hognaston is a small village and civil parish in Derbyshire, East Midlands, England.

Hognaston has a population of approximately 200; including Atlow and increasing at the 2011 Census to 366, and has a play area, pub, church and a village hall.

Built on the side of a valley, which ends at the start of the river, it is made up of mostly newer houses but there are some older 17th and 18th century farm houses and cottages. Due to the dam at Carsington Reservoir, the lower part of the village cannot get mobile phone signal, digital TV through an aerial, or very good radio quality.

St Bartholomew's Church in the centre of the village dates back to the 12th century, the doorway and the middle section dates back to Norman times, shown by the stone carving over the door. This shows a bishop with crook, a lamb with cross, two fishes, a hog and other beasts. It is thought to represent the Agnus Dei. The church is home to Derbyshire's oldest church bell (early 13th century). The stained glass windows were made by Martyns of Cheltenham in the years after the First World War.

The village hall was built in 1982 from the stones of the houses submerged by Carsington reservoir.

Hognaston forms part of the Derbyshire Dales local government district.

== See also ==
- Listed buildings in Hognaston
