= Anthony Gell School =

School in Wirksworth, Derbyshire, England

Location
- Wood Street; Wirksworth, Derbyshire, DE4 4DX; England; 53.0791°N 1.5715°W

Information
- Type: Academy
- Established: 1576; 450 years ago
- Founder: Anthony Gell
- Local authority: Derbyshire
- Trust: Embark Federation
- Department for Education URN: 149644 Tables
- Ofsted: Reports
- Headteacher: Malcolm Kelly
- Gender: Coeducational
- Age: 11 to 18
- Enrolment: 835 as of August 2023
- Website: www.anthonygell.co.uk

Anthony Gell School is a coeducational secondary school and sixth form located in Wirksworth in the English county of Derbyshire.

It began as a Free Grammar School established by Anthony Gell in 1576. The school moved to its present site in 1908 and became a voluntary controlled school in 1944. It became a coeducational comprehensive school in 1965. Previously a voluntary controlled school administered by Derbyshire County Council, in August 2023 the school converted to academy status. The school is now sponsored by the Embark Federation, but continues to be supported by the Anthony Gell School Foundation charitable trust.

Anthony Gell School offers GCSEs and BTECs as programmes of study for pupils, while students in the sixth form have the option to study from a range of A Levels, OCR Nationals and further BTECs. As of 2011 the school's GCSE scores were increasing.

== Notable former pupils ==
- Lawrence Beesley, a survivor of the Titanic, who was widely reported in contemporary newspapers.
- Dame Ellen MacArthur, a sailor who broke the world record for the fastest solo circumnavigation of the globe in 2005.
- Oliver Smith, Youngest branch party president in British political history (at 12 years, 9 months and 13 days) for The Liberal Democrats in 2006.
- Laurence Bostock, the youngest British male to feature in the Skeleton World Cup in the end of January 2020 at St Moritz.
- Cameron Orr, raced for Northern Ireland as a mountain biker specialising in cross-country racing. He represented Northern Ireland at the Commonwealth Games, finishing fourth in the men’s cross-country event in 2022, and won the British elite men’s XCO and marathon titles in 2024.

== Houses ==
Anthony Gell School is split into 5 houses. These houses are:

- Arkwright - Arkwright is named after Richard Arkwright who is a historical figure in the area known for his contributions to the Industrial Revolution and Cromford.
- Gell - Gell is named after Anthony Gell, the founder of the school.
- Fearne - Fearne is named after Agnes Fearne, a relative of Anthony Gell who made bequests to help fund the school.
- Wright - Wright is named after Joseph Wright of Derby, a British landscape and portrait painter.
- Nightingale - Nightingale is named after Florence Nightingale, another historical figure in the area. Nightingale as a house was implemented to the school in 2019.
