= Hopton Hall =

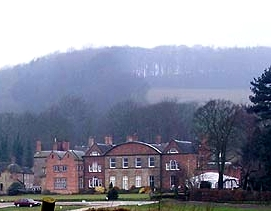
- Hopton Hall today
- Interactive map of the Hopton Hall area

General information
- Location: Hopton, Derbyshire, England
- Coordinates: 53.0758°N 1.6195°W
- Construction started: 14th century
- Client: Thomas Gell

Hopton Hall is a 14th-century manor house and traditionally the residence of the Gell family baronets. It is located in between Carsington and Hopton. Historically associated with Wirksworth lead mining, the Hall is also equal distance from Ashbourne, Derbyshire. It is a Grade II listed building.

The Manor of Hopton, anciently the seat of the de Hopton family, was acquired by the Gell family in 1553 by Ralph Gell (1491–1564) who also purchased lands at Darley Abbey and Rocester.

John Gell was created a baronet in 1642 (see Gell baronets). The Baronetcy was extinct in 1719 and the estate passed to John Eyre in 1732 via his mother Katherine Gell, daughter of 2nd baronet John Gell, at which point Eyre added the surname of Gell.

The house has its origins in the 16th century when it was built by Thomas Gell as a two-storey, three-bay manor house. It was extended and remodelled by Philip Eyre Gell in the late 18th century. The north entrance front has three storeys and seven bays, flanked by tower wings with pyramidal roofs.

Notable members of the Gell family include the religious patron Katherine Gell, Philip Gell's younger brother, Admiral John Gell and Philip's son Sir William Gell.

Philip Gell's daughter and heir married William Pole Thornhill MP, on whose death the estate passed to his kinsman Henry Pole, later known as Henry Chandos-Pole-Gell (High Sheriff of Derbyshire) in 1886.

The estate of some 3,700 acres (15 km^{2}) was broken up in the 20th century, a major part being sold to a water authority for the creation of Carsington Reservoir. The house itself was put up for auction in 1989, passing out of the family.

A recent previous owner is Sir Bill Thomas and his family, a former senior vice president of Hewlett-Packard Europe who was drafted in by Ed Miliband to chair Labour's "small business taskforce". Ed Balls famously forgot his name in the lead up to the 2015 General Election. The formal gardens and lake are open to the public during February and early March for the woodland Snowdrop Walk and during the summer to the Rose Garden. Both periods allow access to the 30 acres (12 ha) of grounds and 2 km (1.2 mi) of signposted paths.

The document collection of the Gell family of Hopton Hall is held by the Derbyshire Record Office.

== See also ==
- Listed buildings in Hopton, Derbyshire
- History of Derbyshire
- Country houses in the United Kingdom
- Hopton, Derbyshire
- Gell Baronets
