= Carsington Water =

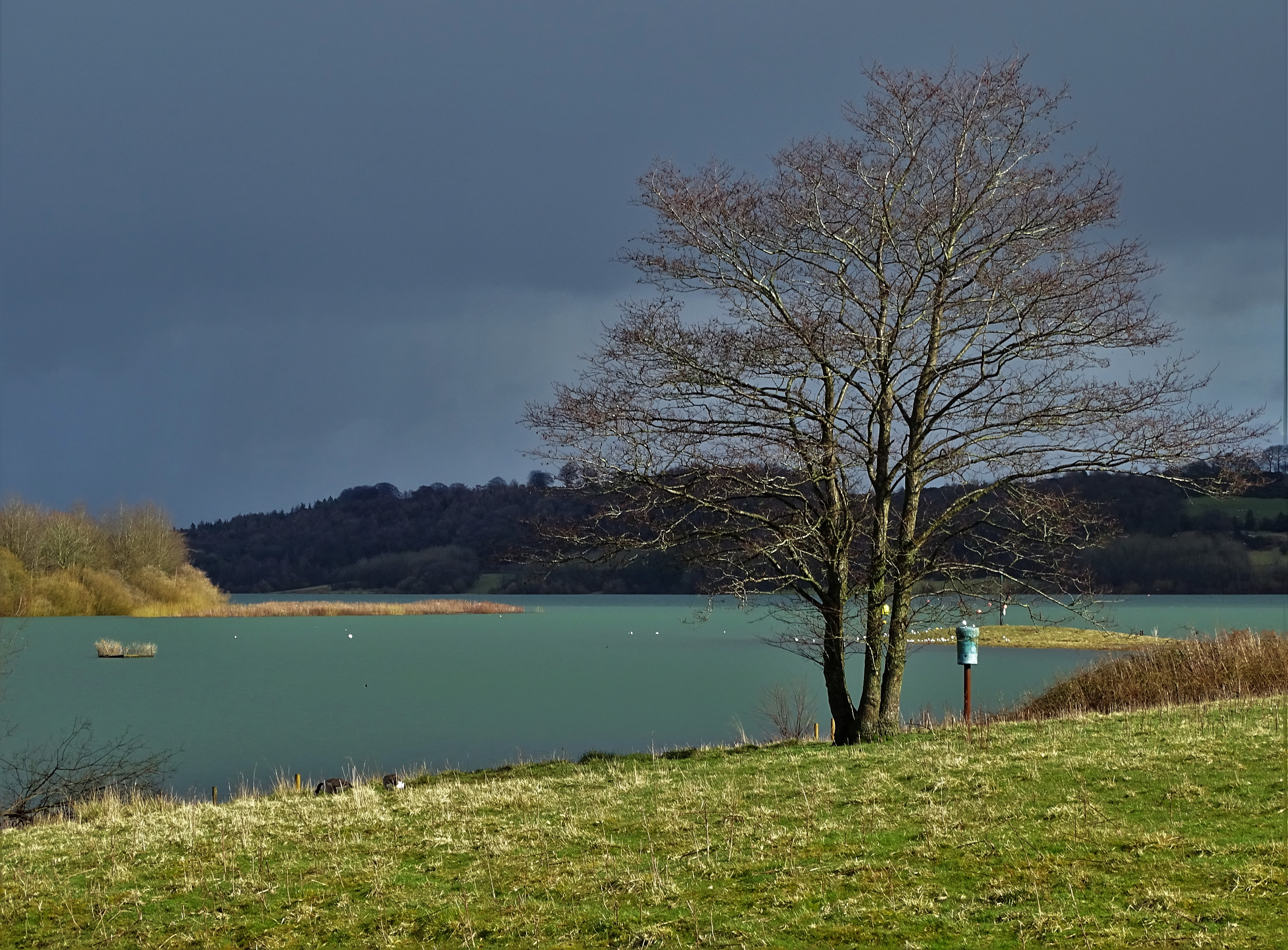
- A view of the reservoir

- Location in Derbyshire
- Location: Derbyshire
- Coordinates: 53°3′30″N 1°37′50″W
- Lake type: reservoir
- Primary inflows: tunnel/aqueduct from River Derwent
- Primary outflows: River Derwent
- Basin countries: United Kingdom
- Managing agency: Severn Trent Water
- Built: 1989
- First flooded: 1992
- Max. depth: 33 m (108 ft)
- Water volume: 35,412 ML (28,709 acre⋅ft)
- Surface elevation: 200 m (660 ft)
- Islands: 2 islands, one opposite the Sailing Club, and the sailing centre.

Carsington Water is a reservoir, operated by Severn Trent Water, between Wirksworth and Kniveton in Derbyshire, England. The reservoir takes water from the River Derwent at Ambergate during winter months, pumping up to the reservoir by 10.5-kilometre (6.5 mi) long tunnels and aqueduct. Water is released back into the river during summer months for water abstraction and treatment further downstream. It is England's ninth-largest reservoir with a capacity of 36,331 megalitres.

Planning for the reservoir started in the 1960s and construction started in 1979. In 1984, there was a partial collapse of the dam before it was filled. The dam was removed before the construction of a new dam began in 1989. The finished reservoir was opened by Queen Elizabeth II in 1992.

The reservoir is a major centre for leisure activities including walking, cycling, fly fishing, birdwatching, sailing, canoeing, and windsurfing. The land surrounding the reservoir, in particular the facilities around the visitor centre, has hosted events including a music festival, the Festival of the Peak.

== Facilities ==
There are three main buildings on the reservoir, which serve the public in a few different ways.

The Visitor Centre is the largest building, with a café featuring panoramic views. There is a small retail outlet currently leased by the RSPB and an outdoor equipment store. Carsington Sports and Leisure is a place for the public to rent equipment, primarily bikes. The company also rents kayaks, canoes, small rowing boats, sailing boats, and windsurfing equipment. The company has a good stock of new windsurf hire equipment, with 3 quality starboard boards and sails from 3.5 to 7.5, with beginner kit also. Carsington Sailing Club owns an extensive proportion of the shoreline. Members can hire boats, as well as store boats from small dinghies to anchored cruisers.

There are also smaller buildings erected by Severn Trent, including a bird hide north of the visitor centre on the circular bike route, as well as other more minor wildlife-based buildings dotted around the track.

There are three car parks by the reservoir, main one at the site and a southerly one, Millfields, that has smaller capacity and a northerly one, Sheepwash, which has a similar capacity.

Birds seen at the site include little owl, little grebe, great northern diver, Eurasian oystercatcher, common tern and breeding common redshank. Feral barnacle geese are found there; a wild, ringed, barnacle goose was found in March 2011—it was ringed at WWT Caerlaverock in Dumfriesshire, Scotland on 8 February 1999.

Fly fishing is available from boats that can be hired from the Fishing Lodge. Fly fishing is for brown trout and rainbow trout only.

A horse riding track around the reservoir allows horse owners to ride round an 8 km route.

== Wildlife Discovery Room at Carsington Water ==
The Wildlife Discovery Room at Carsington Water is operated as a partnership of Derbyshire Wildlife Trust and Severn Trent Water. The Trust offers nature programs for schools, children and families.

== Geochemical lessons from the Carsington dam failure of 1984 and reconstruction ==
The failure in 1984 of the Carsington Dam near the end of its construction led to major advances in several areas of geotechnical engineering. It also led to major advances in understanding the nature and extent of geochemical and mineralogical reactions that can occur in earthworks, and how these can be allowed for in design and construction. These aspects had not been considered in the original investigations and design. This resulted in much greater degradation of the fill materials than expected during construction, the pollution of surface waters, and the deaths of four site personnel.

In the case of the Carsington Dam construction, it was hypothesized that autotrophic bacteria greatly accelerated the oxidation rate of the pyrite, so that it occurred within months during construction. The resulting sulphuric acid reacted with the drainage blanket constructed of carboniferous limestone, which then resulted in the precipitation of gypsum and iron hydroxide, the clogging of drains and the generation of carbon dioxide.
