= Gell =

Gell is a surname, and may refer to:

- Alan Gell, American sentenced to death for murder, released when trial evidence proven flawed
- Alfred Gell (1945–1997), British social anthropologist
- Anthony Gell (1522–1583), lawyer and philanthropist
- David Gell (born 1929), Canadian DJ and television presenter
- Edith Mary Gell (1866–1944), English writer and Christian activist
- Fiona Gell (born 1970s), Manx marine biologist and writer
- Florence Gell (née Bailey, 1906–2001), Canadian civic leader
- Harry Dickson Gell (1845–1929), accountant in South Australia
- Heather Gell (1896–1988), Australian kindergarten teacher, eurhythmics pioneer, and broadcaster
- Henry Chandos Pole Gell, (1829–1902), High Sheriff of Derbyshire
- Luke Gell, English actor
- John Gell (disambiguation), several people
- Katherine Gell, (1624–1671)
- Mary Gell (1894–1978), a medical missionary
- Murray Gell-Mann (1929–2019), American Nobel Prize-winning physicist
- Philip Gell (disambiguation), several people
- Rob Gell (born 1952), Australian meteorologist and TV weather presenter
- William Gell (1777–1836), English archaeologist and illustrator

== See also ==
- Gell baronets
- Gel
