= Gejl =

Gejl is a Danish surname, and a Danish middle name

Notable people with the surname include:

- Mille Gejl (born 1999), Danish footballer
- Torsten Gejl (born 1964), Danish politician

== See also ==
- Gejlarat (disambiguation)
- Gell
