= Inspissation =

Process of increasing the viscosity of a fluid

Inspissation (literally meaning "thickening") is the process of increasing the viscosity of a fluid, or even of causing a fluid to solidify, typically by dehydration or otherwise reducing its content of solvents. The term also has been applied to coagulation by heating of some substances such as albumens, or to cooling some substances such as solutions of gelatin or agar. Some forms of inspissation may be reversed by re-introducing solvent, such as by adding water to molasses or to gum arabic; in other forms, its resistance to flow may include cross-linking or mutual adhesion of its component particles or molecules, in ways that prevent their dissolving again, such as in the irreversible setting or gelling of some kinds of rubber latex, egg-white, adhesives, or coagulation of blood.

== Intentional use ==
Inspissation is the process used when heating high-protein-containing media; for example to enable recovery of bacteria for testing. Once inspissation has occurred, any stained bacteria, such as Mycobacteria, can then be isolated.

A serum inspissation or fractional sterilization is a process of heating an article on 3 successive days as follows:

Day	Temperature	Time	Purpose
1	85 °C	60 minutes	Drying of the medium and killing the organisms in their vegetative form
Time in between		Overnight incubation	Growth of vegetative forms from spores
2	75 to 80 °C	20 minutes	Killing the organisms in their vegetative form
Time in between		Overnight incubation	Growth of vegetative forms from any spores remaining
3	75 to 85 °C	20 minutes	Killing the organisms in their vegetative form as well as the leftover spores

== Pathologic inspissation ==
In cystic fibrosis, inspissation of secretions in the respiratory and gastrointestinal tracts is a major mechanism causing the disease.
