= Coagulant =

Coagulant may refer to:

- Coagulant in coagulation of the blood
- Coagulant in flocculation in colloidal chemistry
- Coagulation (water treatment)

== See also ==
- Coagulation (disambiguation)
