= Beverley Hills Apartment Block =

Historic apartment development in Melbourne, Australia

Coordinates: 37°50′4″S 144°59′30″E

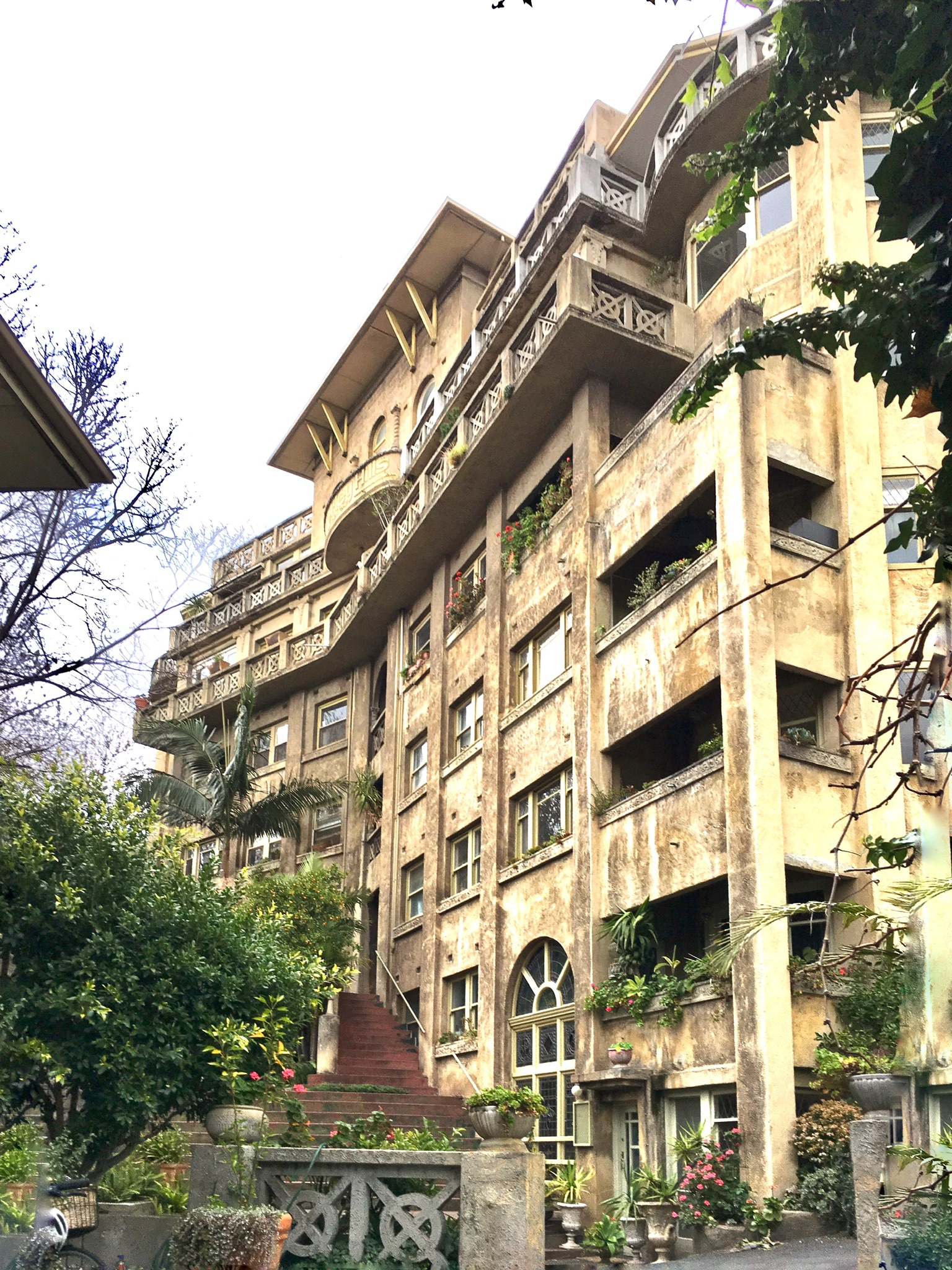
Beverley Hills apartments, South Yarra, Block 2 from access stairs past the pool

Beverley Hills is a landmark historic apartment development at 65 Darling Street in South Yarra, a suburb of Melbourne, Australia, designed by the architect and developer Howard Lawson, and built in 1935-36. Consisting of two blocks in a shared landscape including a swimming pool, they are the best known of a larger precinct of at least 15 apartment buildings in the immediate area. all developed by Lawson and business partner Reginald Biffen in the 1930s, .

== Howard Lawson ==
Howard Ratcliff Lawson (1886–1946) was an architect, property developer and builder who specialised in apartments from the 1910s to the 1940s. He is reputed to have designed over 200 places, and is most noted for the series of apartments in and around the Beverley Hills blocks, as well as the Gardens of the Moon at Arthur's Seat. Lawson famously advertised himself as ‘the architect who builds’, a claim that later seemed to stretch the truth since was not a registered architect. In 1923 his application to the new architects registration board had been rejected since the board frowned on the practice of being both architect and builder, however, up until 1939 there was no restriction on the use of the term architect.

== Context ==
By the 1920s in Australia, the apartment was growing more common as an accepted means of housing, as areas like Potts Point and Darlinghurst in Sydney and St Kilda in Melbourne began to embrace higher-density living. However, despite an increasingly affluent clientele, there was still a widely held belief that flats were not fit for a home and high-density living was still often associated with the crowded workers tenements of North America and Europe. This led to attempts to ban flats outright by some local governments in NSW and Victoria and the different laws introduced by governments in the two states begin to create differing languages of design in the two cities, with Melbourne's stricter open space provisions creating a unique character of apartments in the city. Melbourne apartment buildings were very rarely more than three storeys, ie. ‘walk ups’ without lifts, and usually set back from boundaries with sometimes large front gardens, unlike their sometimes larger scale Sydney counterparts. This type of development allowed the inner south and eastern suburbs of Melbourne where apartment development concentrated, around St Kilda, Elwood and South Yarra, to maintain a more suburban image. Unlike Sydney, only two 'elevator' blocks were built in the CBD itself before WW2, and only a handful outside.

It was against this backdrop that Lawson constructed his Beverley Hills blocks, which, at a total of seven storeys high, caused a stir amongst nearby residents. Lawson's future work on the site was subsequently restricted to three storeys, making the Beverley Hills complex unique in the area and indeed Melbourne for its size and character.

== Description ==
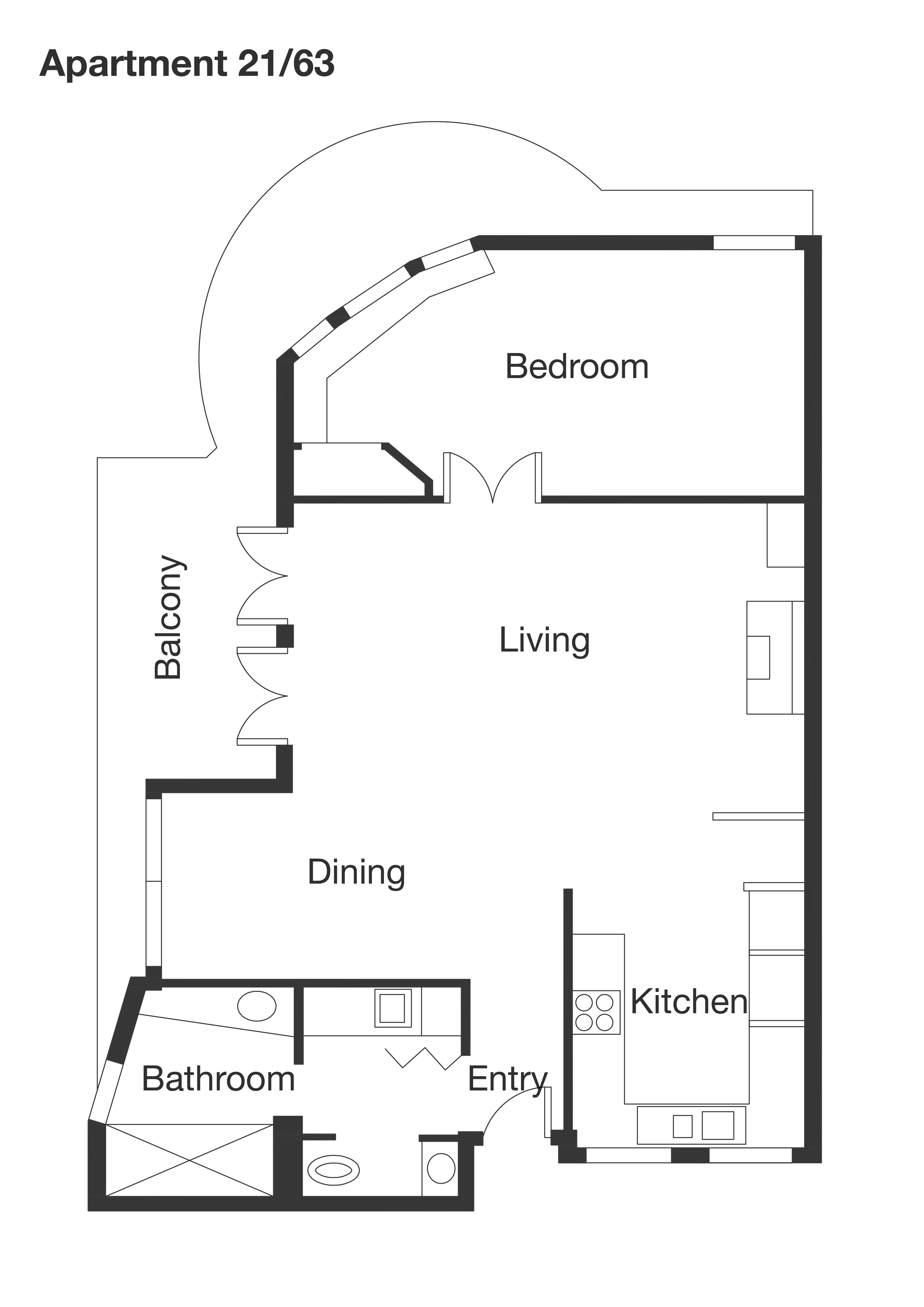
Beverley Hills Apartments - Apartment 21/63, Plan

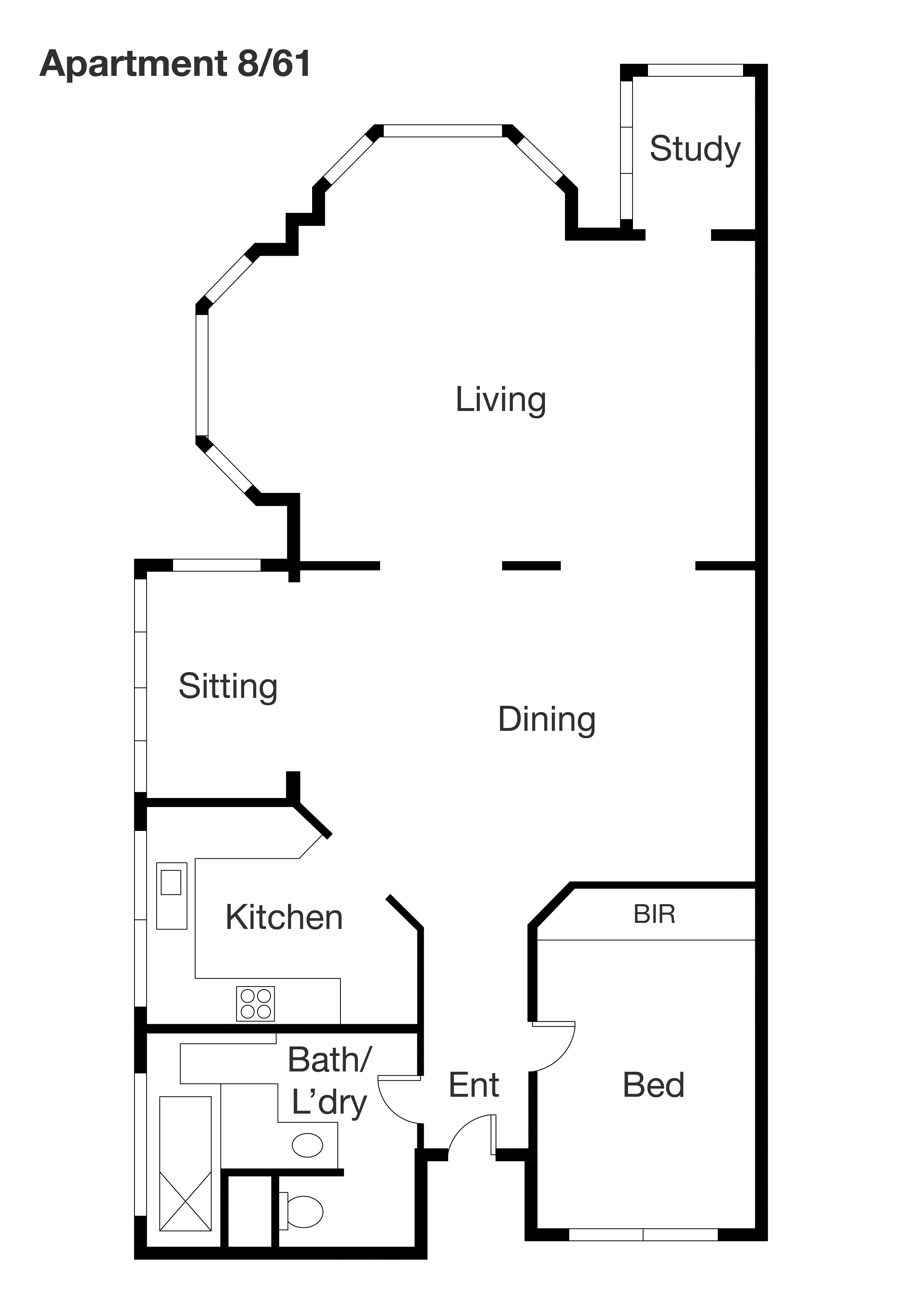
Beverley Hills Apartments - Apartment 8/61, Plan

The development consisted of two separate blocks, with the larger Block 2 set behind and uphill from Block 1, on a steep sloping site up from Darling Street. Each block is nominally 5 storeys, but with the slope allowing for flats below the main entrance, the front building, Block 1 is six floors and the rear Block 2 is seven. They are set within a landscape of steep stairs and paths, balustrades and platforms, amongst heavy planting of trees and shrubs, with the famous pool part way up the site.

Each block includes a tall narrow light well/courtyard which includes the access stairs, allowing some light and air to penetrate into the building.

Most apartments are 1 or 2 bedrooms, tightly planned with a small kitchen, and bathroom, with the emphasis being on the living and bedroom spaces. Most apartments maintain a strong visual connection to the outside through balconies, opening to the land along or on upper levels sweeping views north towards the Yarra River and over the flat suburb of Richmond beyond.

== Key influences and design approach ==
Arguably the most flamboyant of Lawson's work in South Yarra, Beverley Hills can be broadly described as Spanish Mission style, but in Lawsons own eclectic version, with a dash of Hollywood-esque glamour. The style was particularly popular in California, New Mexico and Florida and brought together elements of Spanish Baroque with a romanticized image of the simplicity and monastic qualities of the early Californian Spanish Missions. Brought to Australia in 1918 by Leslie Wilkinson, professor of Architecture at Sydney University, the style was popularized by many Hollywood stars during the interwar period, and became associated with glamour and luxury, influencing a number of up-market homes in and around Sydney. As evident in the name ‘Beverley Hills’, a clear reference to upscale Beverly Hills in Los Angeles, Lawson's otherwise modest flats express the opulence and grandeur of 1930s Hollywood, even featuring an under-water window into the swimming pool.

Architecturally, the building features the motif of a circle and a cross in the balustrading and detailing, seen in much of Lawson's work. Spanish Mission style elements include the rough textured grey stucco used throughout, the barley sugar-twist columns, the elaborate patterning on the window cills and above some of the windows, and the steep red tiled roofs. Some medieval ‘Old English’ features also appear, in the lettering of the signage and the diamond pattern leadlight windows.

The large mass of the buildings are varied by the use of shallow bay windows, inset balconies, and projecting horizontal balconies at the top floor, and the deep raves of the roofs (which are effectively just for show, with flat roofs used a patios behind).

Like the architecture, the choice of planting heavily references the Hollywood Spanish style, with palms and cactus featuring throughout the complex, as well as vines and creepers which soften the greyness of the stucco finish.

== Gallery ==
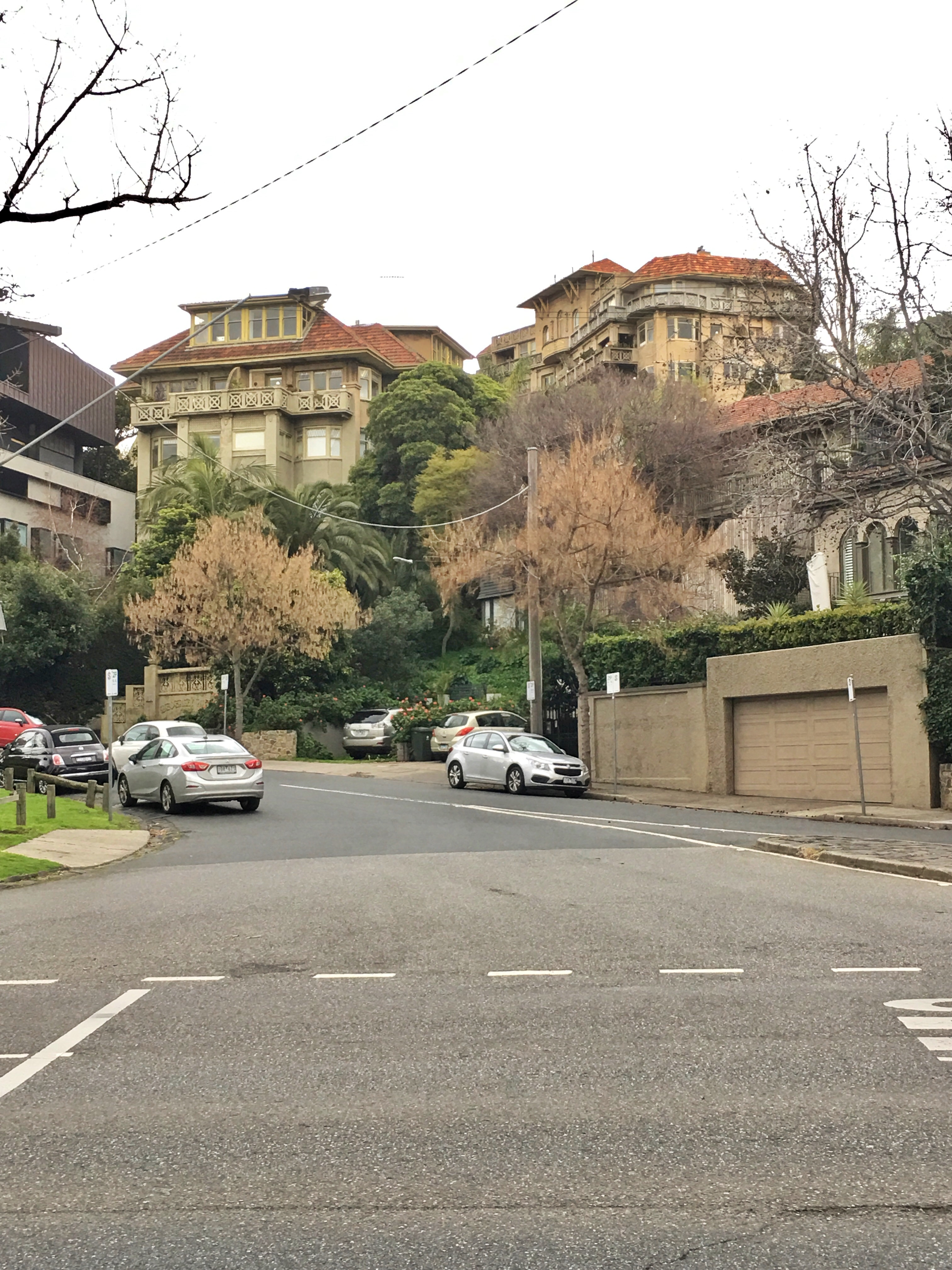
View from river bank - Block 1 in front, Block 2 behind

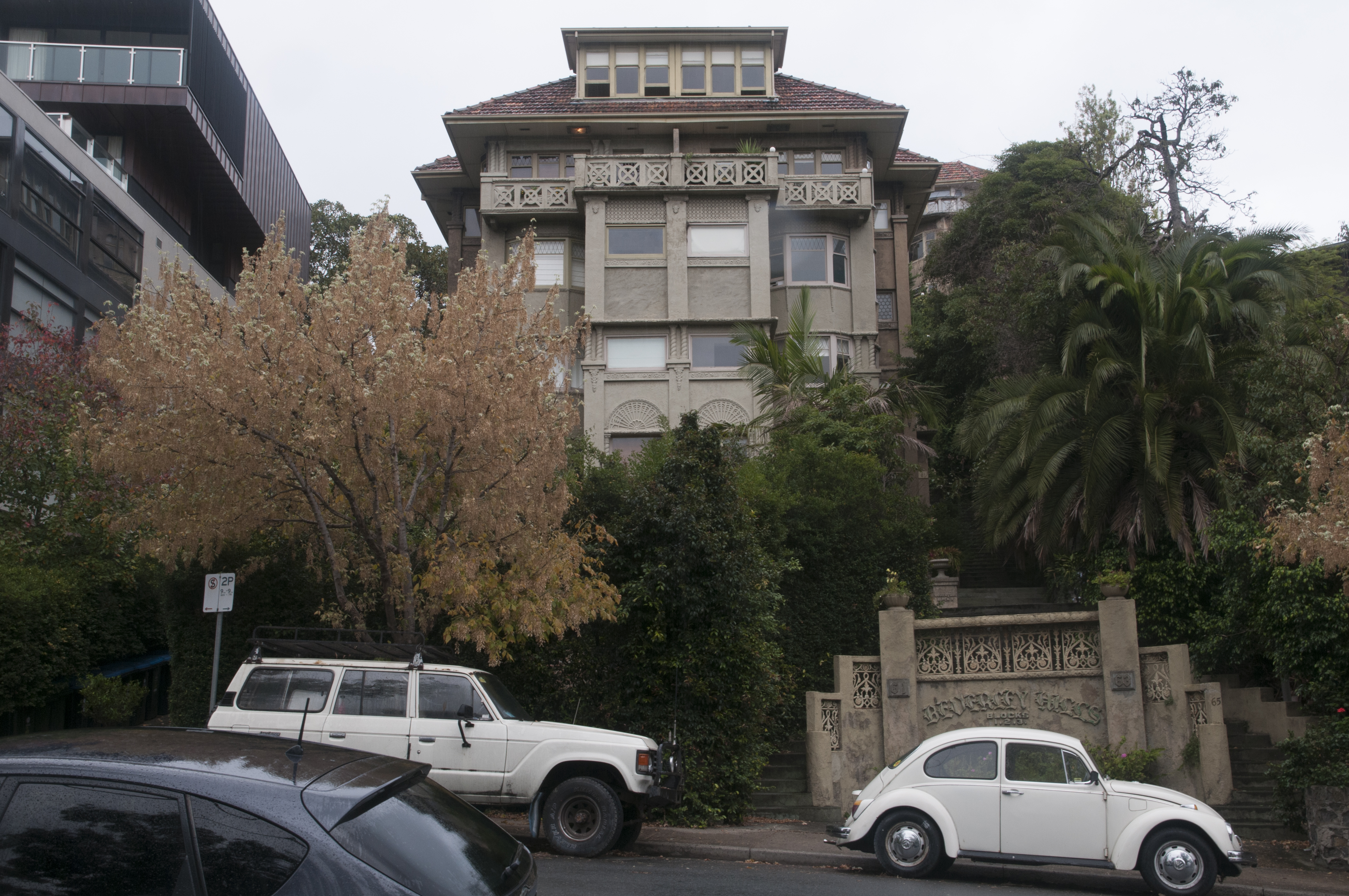
Beverley Hills, Block 1, and entrance, from Darling Street

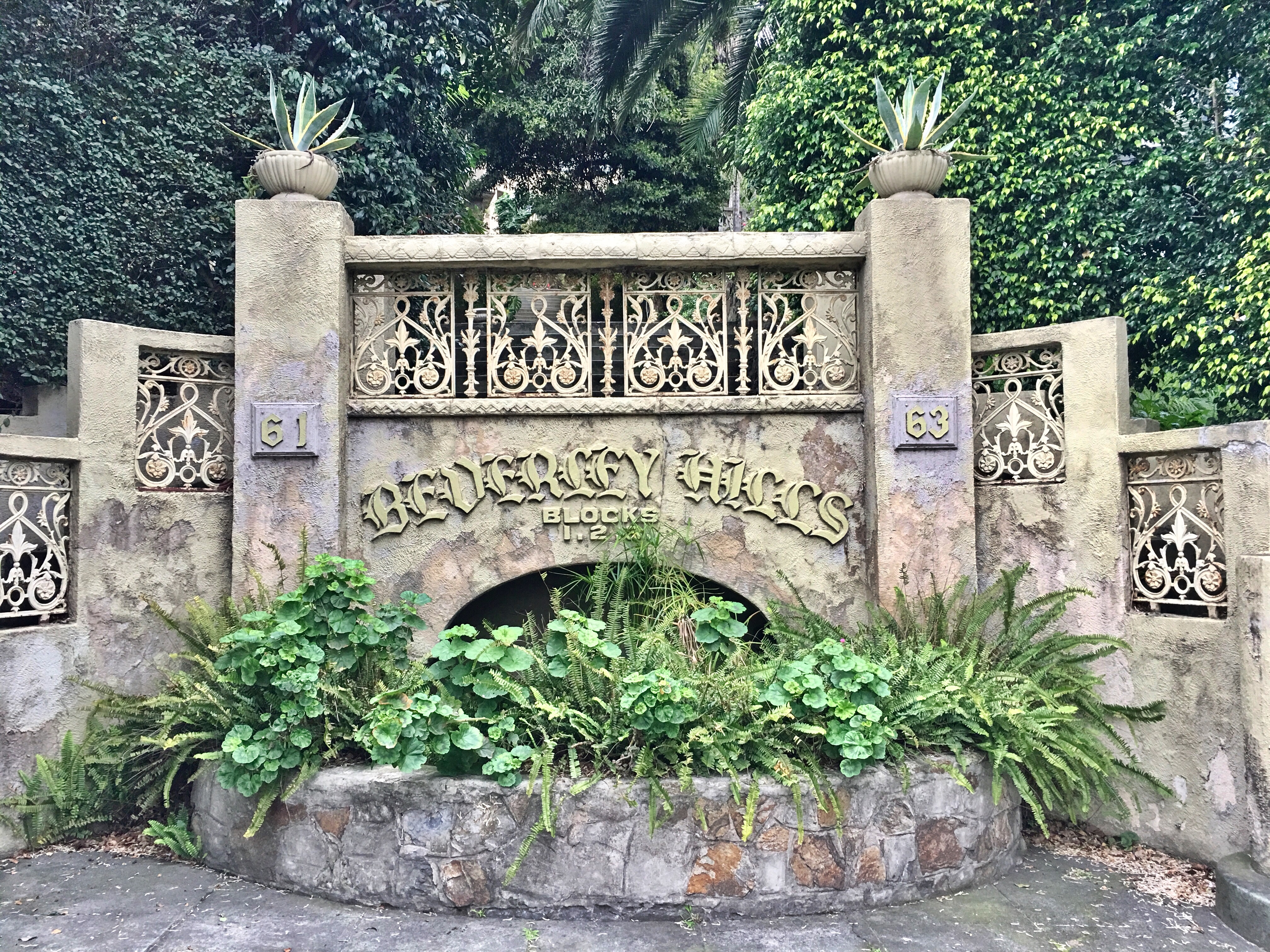
Beverley Hills entry stairs on Darling Street

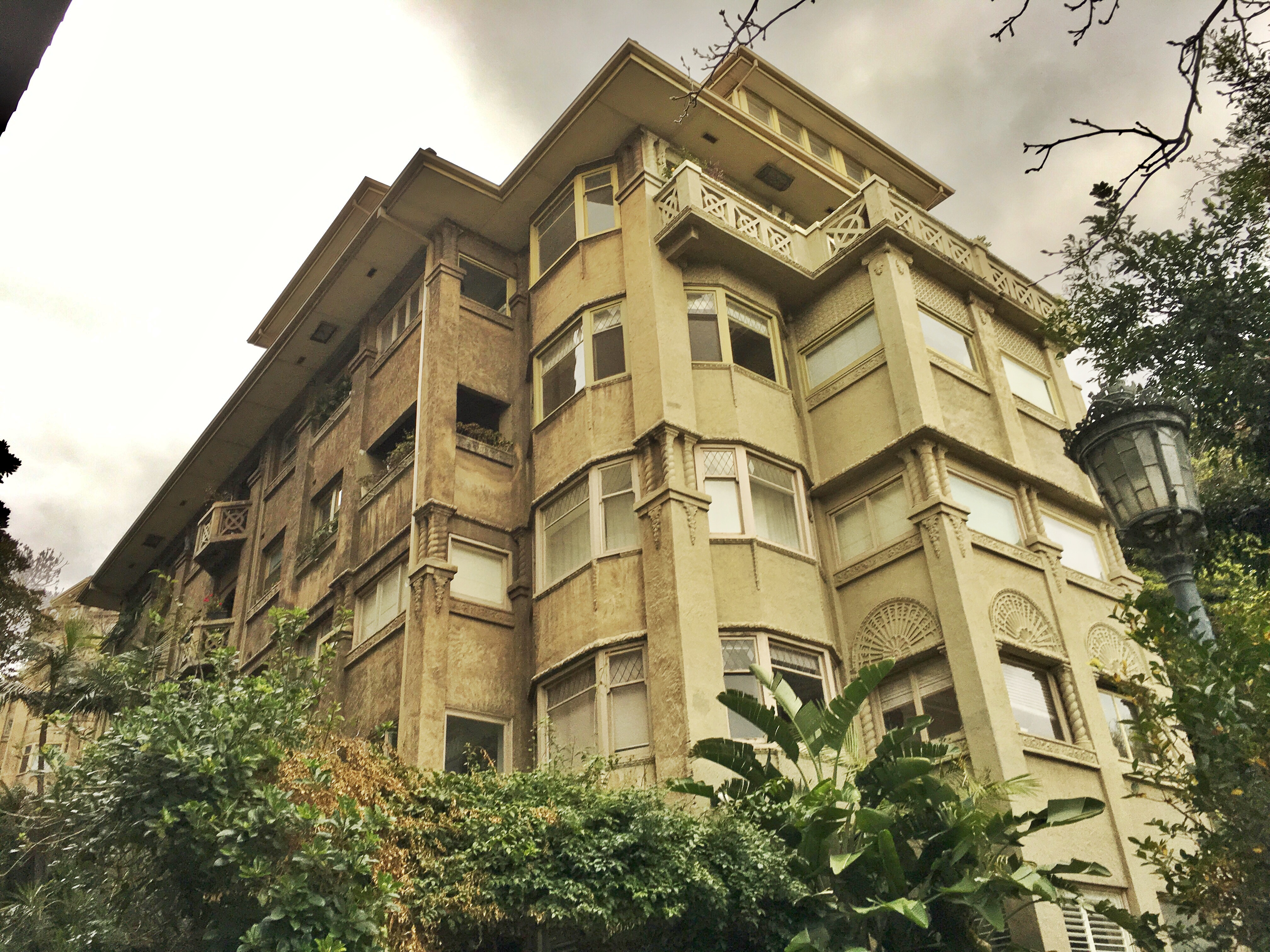
Beverly Hills, Block 1, from Darling Street

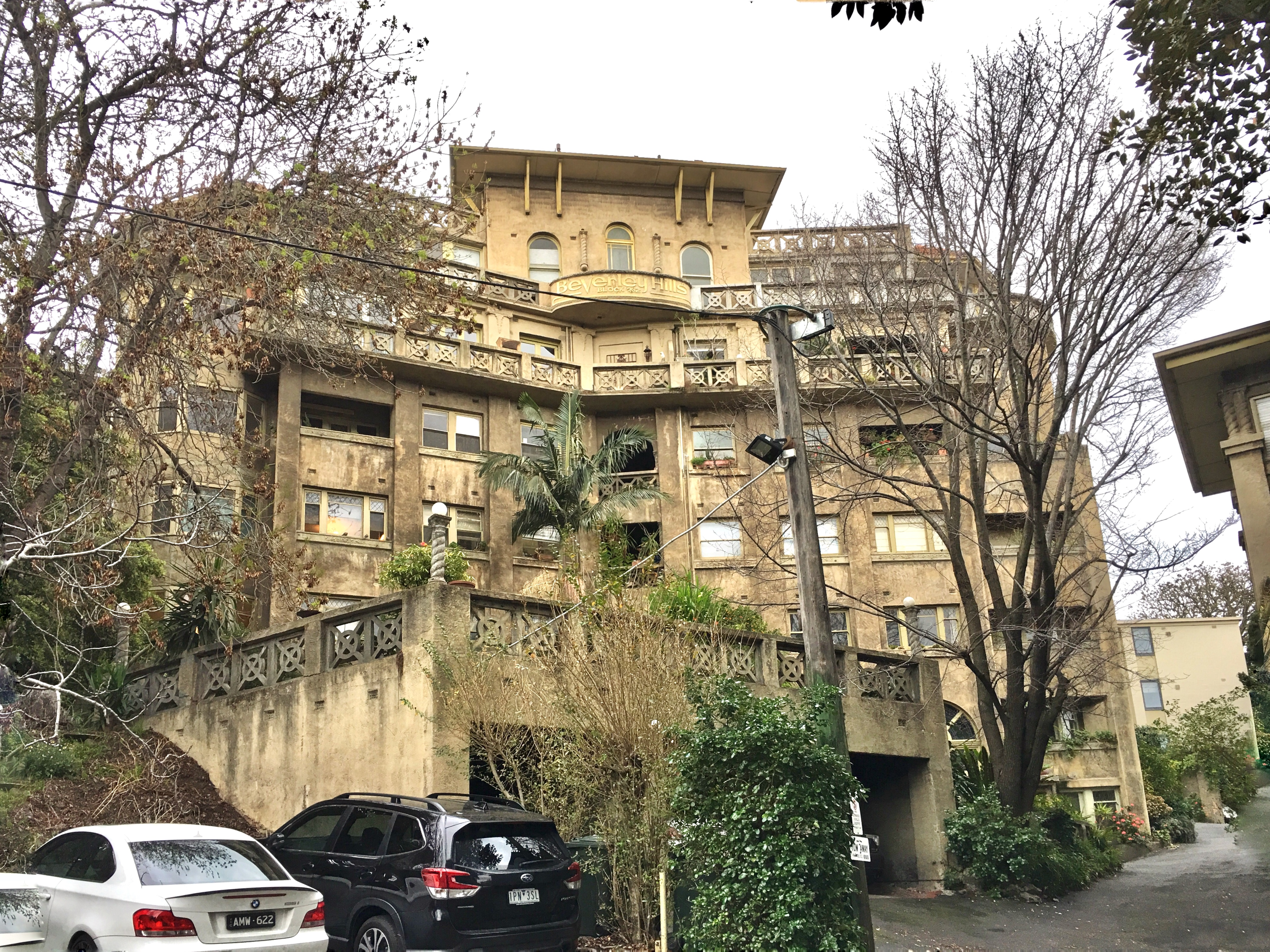
Beverly Hills, Block 2

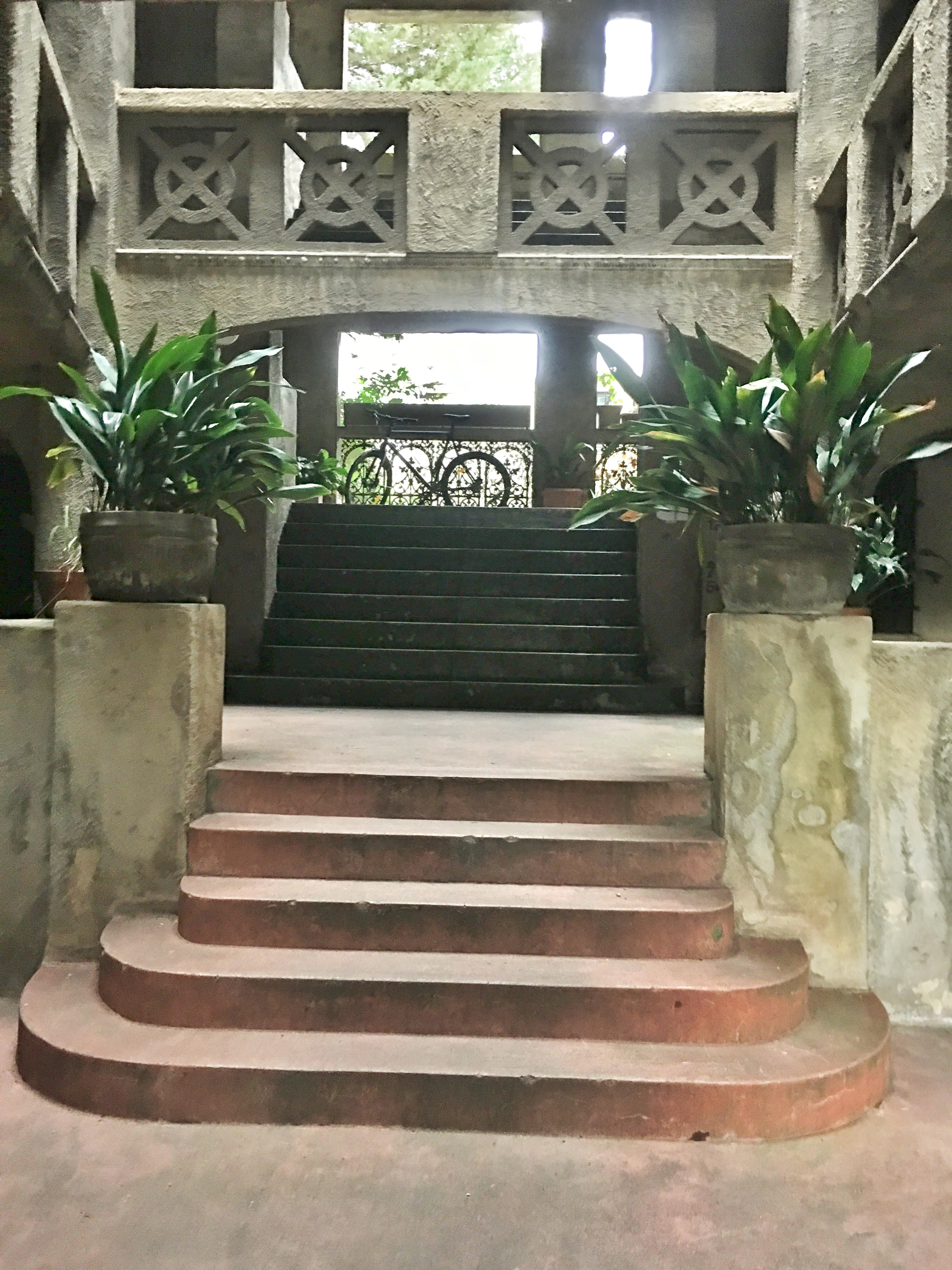
Entry to Block 2

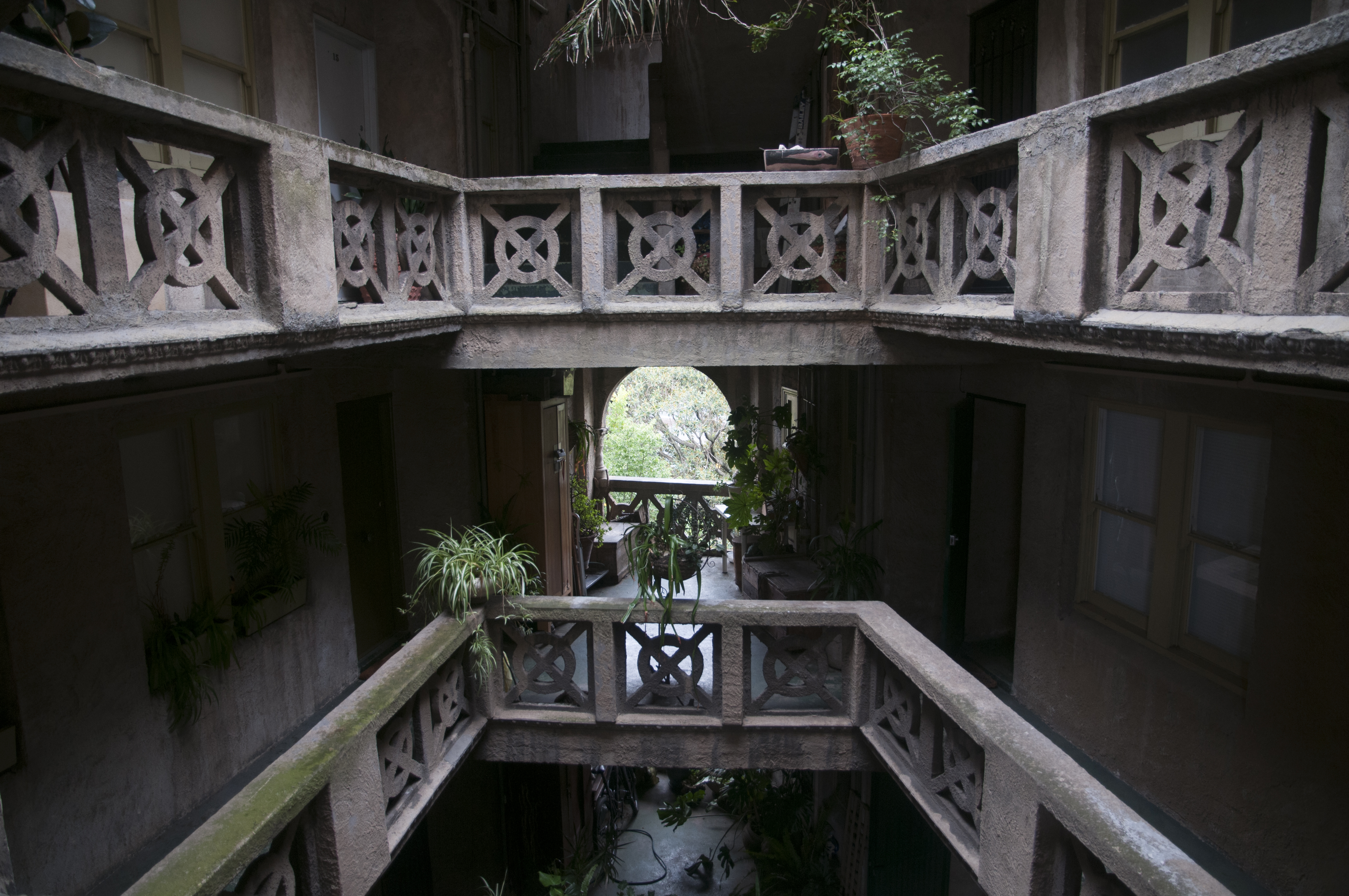
Entry lightwell, Block 2

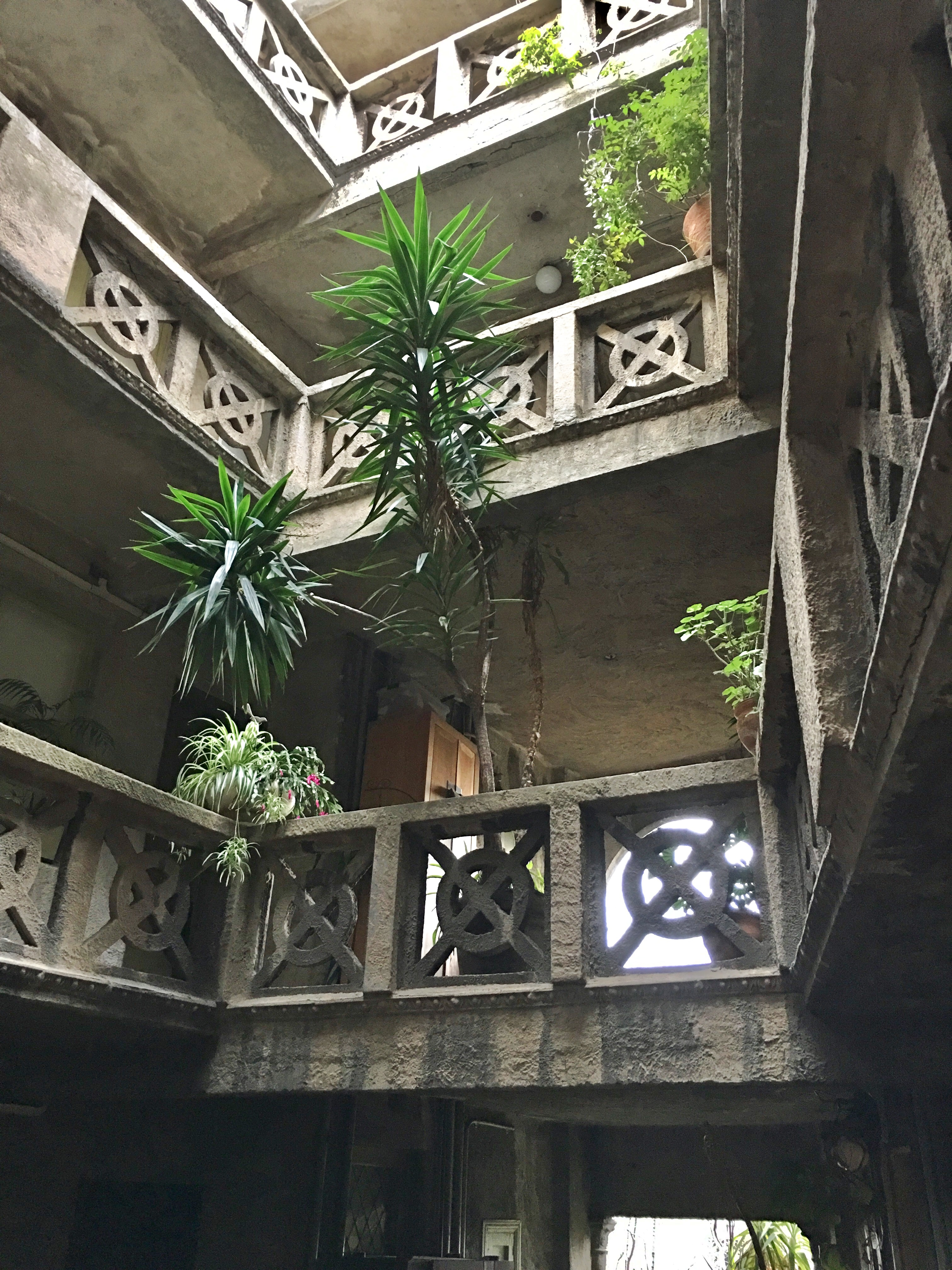
Entry lightwell, Block 2, looking up.

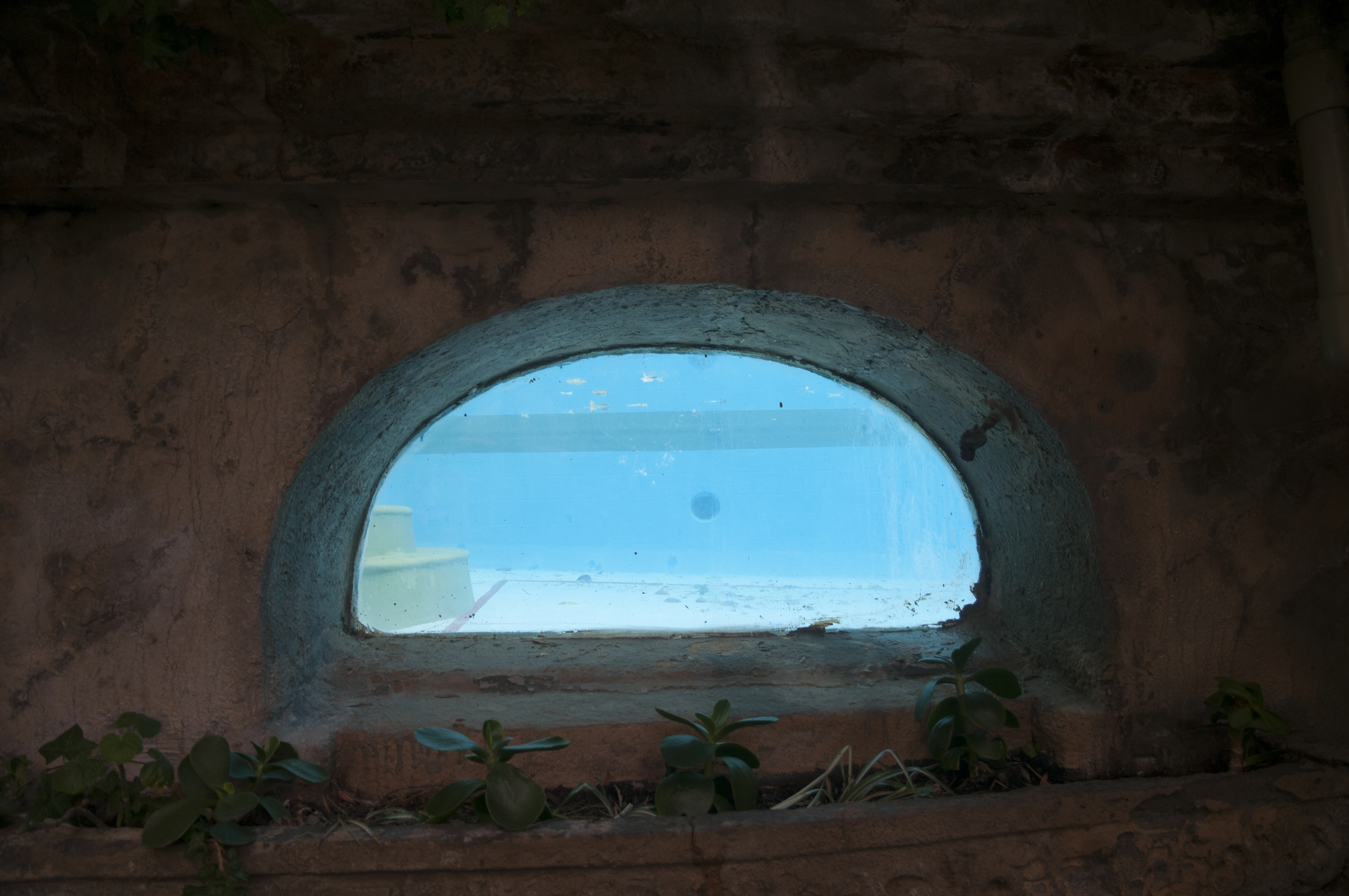
Pool window
