= War on Want =

Anti-poverty charity

- Founded: February 1951; 75 years ago
- Type: Charity
- Registration no.: 208724
- Location: 44–48 Shepherdess Walk, London N1 7JP, United Kingdom
- Revenue: £1,614,143 (2019)
- Expenses: £1,715,907 (2019)
- Employees: 18
- Website: waronwant.org
- Formerly called: Association For World Peace

War on Want is an anti-poverty charity based in London. War on Want works to challenge the root causes of poverty, inequality and injustice through partnership with social movements in the global South and campaigns in the UK. War on Want's slogan is "poverty is political" and its stated focus is on the root causes of poverty rather than its effects.

War on Want is a membership organisation governed by an elected council of management drawn from its membership. War on Want patrons include Naomi Klein, Owen Jones, Raj Patel and Mark Serwotka.

== History ==
The organisation was formed in 1951 after a letter in The Manchester Guardian from Victor Gollancz was read by Harold Wilson, later British Prime Minister, who coined the name. Since then, the organisation has taken part in many campaigns and investigations, including in the 1970s helping to expose baby food companies marketing powdered milk infant formula as a healthier option than breast milk to mothers in the developing world – a dangerous and expensive option for these mothers who had no access to safe drinking water and sterilisation facilities.

In the 1980s, War on Want campaigned on the role of women in the developing world, and supported liberation movements in Eritrea, South Africa and Western Sahara.

From 1983 to 1987, George Galloway was General Secretary of War on Want. The Daily Mirror accused Galloway of living luxuriously at the charity's expense. An independent auditor cleared him of misuse of funds, though he did repay £1,720 in contested expenses. The official history of the charity says that Galloway's methods of management created interpersonal problems among the staff, and although the charity grew under Galloway, his period in charge was followed by a serious internal crisis.

More than two years after Galloway stepped down as general secretary after being elected as a Labour MP, the British Government's Charity Commission investigated War on Want, finding accounting irregularities including that the financial reports were "materially mis-stated" from 1985 to 1989, but little evidence that money was used for non-charitable purposes. Galloway had been general secretary for the first three of those years. The commission said responsibility lay largely with auditors and did not single out individuals for blame. War on Want was found to have been insolvent, and subsequently dismissed most of its staff and narrowly avoided administration. It was relaunched in 1991.

In the 1990s, it focused on issues that resulted from globalisation, including workers' rights and a call to set up a Tobin tax on currency speculation. The charity set up the Tobin tax Network (now a separate charity called Stamp Out Poverty) to develop the proposal and press for its introduction.

In 2006 War on Want launched a campaign for Palestinian human rights, including a report titled Profiting from the Occupation, which looked at European corporations who the charity claimed were profiting from Israel's occupation of Palestinian territories. The campaign was praised by The Guardian at the time, which named the charity "Campaign of the Week". In 2007 MP Lee Scott complained to the Charity Commission about an online "guide for boycott, divestment and sanctions" against Israel. War on Want said it already had permission from the commission to advocate boycotts and sanctions to address "the root causes of poverty and human rights abuses". In July 2009 the Commission concluded that no regulatory action was required, declaring itself satisfied that the charity's trustees understood the official guidance on campaigning by charities and that War on Want's campaigns on Palestine were linked to its charitable objects, making them legitimate under charity law. War on Want has continued its support of the BDS movement.

In 2011, War on Want marked its 60th anniversary with a repeat of the Yes campaign that first formed the charity, asking people to email the word Yes to show their support for withdrawal of troops from Afghanistan. They delivered the petition to Foreign Secretary William Hague.

== Current work ==
=== Transatlantic Trade and Investment Partnership ===
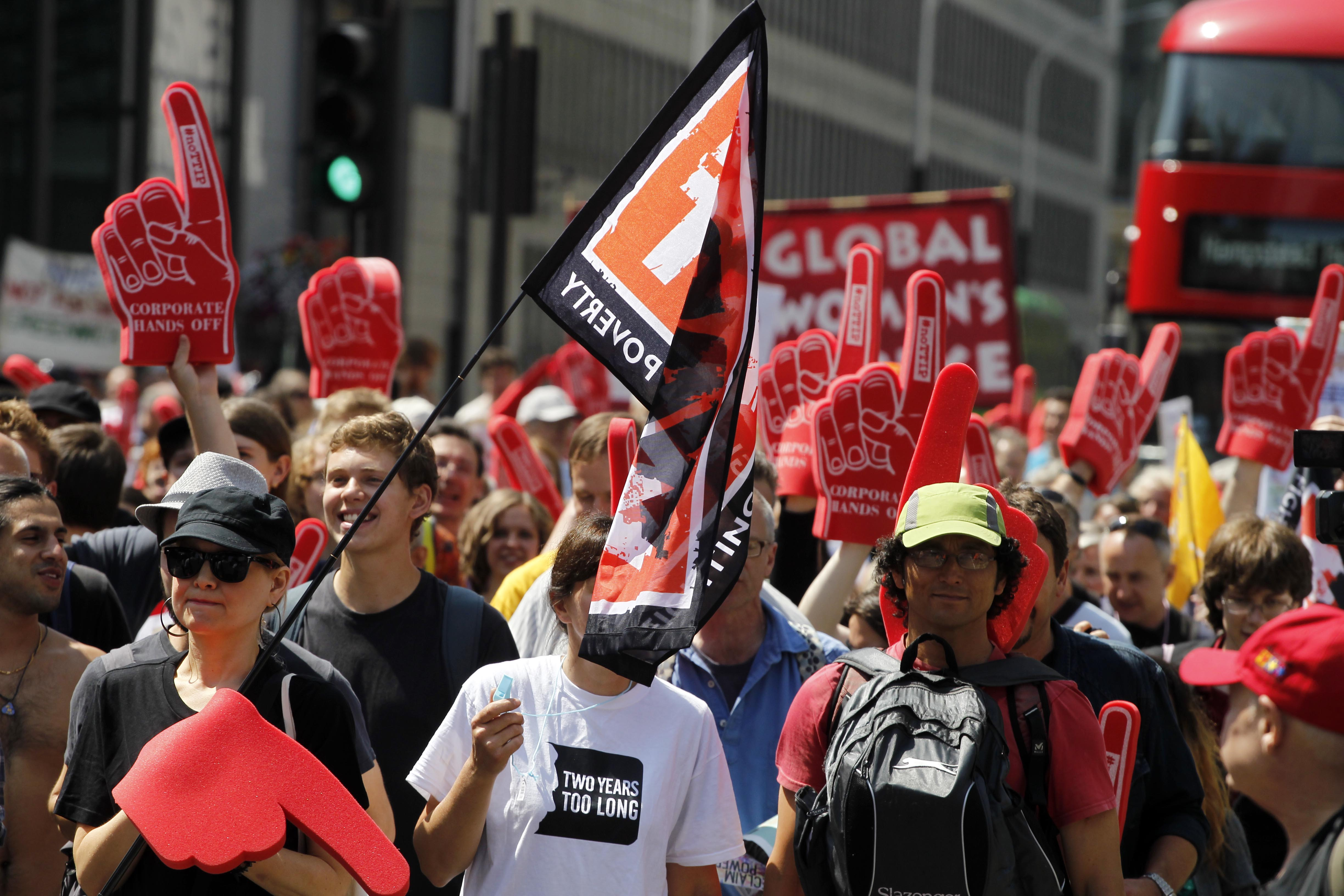
War on Want at TTIP protest in London

War on Want is campaigning against the Transatlantic Trade and Investment Partnership (TTIP). TTIP is a proposed free trade agreement being secretly negotiated between the European Union and the United States. It argues that TTIP will cost more than one million jobs, lead to the irreversible privatisation of public services, a "race to the bottom" in food, environmental and labour standards and allow US companies to sue the UK government in private courts.

=== Israel ===
War on Want is calling for a two-way arms embargo between the UK and Israel. War on Want believes that by selling arms to Israel, the UK government is complicit in Israel's crimes against the Palestinian people. War on Want advocates for a boycott of Israel until it complies with international law. It also campaigns to expose companies which sustain and profit from the Israeli-occupied territories.

=== Food sovereignty ===
War on Want's The Hunger Games report revealed how the Department for International Development (DFID) used hundreds of millions of pounds of taxpayers' money with the express purpose of extending the power of agribusiness over the production of food in Africa. War on Want believes the root cause of the global food crisis is that food is treated like a financial commodity to be traded, and not a right for communities. It believes food production should be in the hands of small-scale producers.

=== Other campaigns ===
In its campaigning and programmes strands of work, War on Want focuses on

- corporate accountability
- private security companies
- the rights of Palestinians and putting a stop to the separation barrier
- the rights of the Saharawi in Western Sahara
- campaigning for tax justice
- securing workers' rights and a living wage for everyone
- informal economy
- sweatshop and plantation workers
- trade justice
- food justice
- halting the privatisation of vital resources in the global South
- The papers of War on Want are held at SOAS Archives

Organisations supported include those helping small-scale farmers in Sri Lanka, sweatshop workers in Bangladesh, olive farmers in the Palestinian territories and factory workers in China.

War on Want has released a series of "alternative reports" highlighting issues such as Coca-Cola's overseas activities allegedly causing poverty and environmental damage. It has also released research on alleged human rights abuses by private military and security companies in Iraq and elsewhere, and a report highlighting how companies such as Tesco, Primark and Asda sell goods made by sweatshop labour in Bangladesh. War on Want campaigns against these corporations, and calls for the British government to regulate these industries as well for as the businesses themselves to take responsibility for their actions. In 2010, War on Want released a report exposing the companies that it describes as "profiting" from Israel's occupation of the West Bank, and calling on ordinary people around the world to take action.

== Response ==
=== Solidarity ===
War on Want has issued numerous statements of solidarity with organisations and movements all over the world. In October 2009, War on Want issued a statement of solidarity with Abahlali baseMjondolo in response to attacks on the Kennedy Road informal settlement and wrote a letter to the South African High Commissioner in London. The charity also spearheaded a campaign highlighting the forced displacement of poor South Africans in the lead-up to the 2010 World Cup.

=== Israel boycott ===
In 2010, War on Want's campaign "Help win justice for the Palestinian people this Christmas" accused Israel of "illegal Occupation," "daily human rights abuses," and "the siege on Gaza and the Apartheid Wall." As in previous years, War on Want called for holiday donations in the form of "alternative gifts," to "launch a sustained campaign against UK companies that are profiting from the Occupation" and to "secure compensation for those who have lost land due to construction of the Apartheid Wall."

NGO Monitor's Dan Kosky wrote that due to War on Want's support of an Israel boycott and its stand against the British presence in Iraq, a thorough review of the organization should be conducted by the UK regarding funding, for "if not, the United Kingdom could find itself aiding an Israel boycott campaign." In January 2018, War on Want was listed as one of 20 anti-Israel BDS organizations banned from entering Israel and Israeli-occupied territory. Israeli Strategic Affairs Minister Gilad Erdan who formulated the list stated, "Boycott organisations need to know that Israel will act against them and will not allow [them] to enter its territory in order to harm its citizens." In response, War on Want stated "For 70 years, Israel has subjected Palestinians to a range of human rights abuses including travel bans... this blacklist is a repressive tactic borrowed from the same playbook used by the apartheid regime in South Africa."

In October 2018, War on Want's PayPal account was terminated after receiving a complaint from two pro-Israeli legal groups; the Lawfare Project and UK Lawyers for Israel. The groups alleged that War on Want had links to the Popular Front for the Liberation of Palestine. The groups also lodged a complaint with the Charity Commission which, however, in July 2019 cleared the charity of any wrongdoing.

In April 2020, "Oliver Taylor" got articles published in Arutz Sheva, The Algemeiner, The Times of Israel, and The Jerusalem Post. In these, he repeated the allegations made by the pro-Israeli groups that War on Want had "ties to terrorist entities". Taylor described himself as a "24-year-old student, barista, and political activist. During the week I work on completing my masters in political science, and come the weekend you will find me engrossed in all things coffee. Whether I am brewing it or sipping it." His profile photo was that of a young brown-eyed man smiling with a light stubble. But a report by Reuters concluded that Taylor most likely did not exist. There was no record of Oliver Taylor on the University of Birmingham where he supposedly studied and the six experts interviewed by Reuters agreed that the profile photo was a deepfake. The websites were forced to take down the articles when contacted by lawyers. Who actually penned those articles remained a mystery.

== Finances ==
Income in the years from 2011/12 to 2015/16 ranged from £1.6m (2011/12) to a high point of £2.1m (2014/15), with public donations and legacies the main source.

In FY19/20, War on Want received funding from the following prominent organisations:

- Christian Aid
- Comic Relief
- The MCS Foundation
- The Network for Social Change
- The Open Society Foundation
- The Polden Puckham Charitable Foundation
- Rockefeller Brothers Foundation
- Rosa Luxemburg Foundation
- Service Employees International Union
- University of Sussex
- Trade Justice Movement
- The Waterloo Foundation

== See also ==
- Alter-globalisation
- Anti-globalisation movement
- Poverty in the United Kingdom
- The Make Poverty History coalition, of which War on Want is a member.
- Mary Gell
- National Minimum Wage Act 1998
- Nestlé boycott
- Robin Hood tax
- Solidar, a European network of development and social welfare organisations that War on Want was affiliated to.
- Harold John Timperley (secretary and treasurer in the 1950s)
