= Ellinor Walker =

Australian kindergarten teacher (1893 – 1990)

Ellinor Gertrude Walker OBE
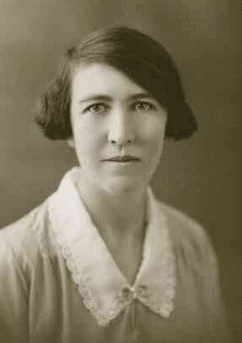
- Born: 9 April 1893; South Yarra, Victoria, Australia
- Died: 7 November 1990 (aged 97); Norwood, South Australia
- Occupation: Kindergarten teacher

Ellinor Gertrude Walker OBE (9 April 1893 – 7 November 1990) was an Australian kindergarten teacher and women's rights activist. She wrote plays and poems and is credited with drafting The Guardianship of Infants Act passed in 1940 in South Australia.

== Life ==
Walker was born in 1893 in the Melbourne suburb of South Yarra. In 1902 she moved with her family to Adelaide, where she was educated at the Wilderness School and Norwood High School.

In 1916 she enrolled at the Adelaide Kindergarten Training College (one source says 1917). The college was led by Lillian Daphne de Lissa who was headhunted in early 1917 to lead a similar college in Britain. de Lissa said that she would try to find a replacement for herself. Walker became the principal of the Halifax Street Free Kindergarten which gave assistance to the poor mothers of the area.

In 1919 the flu pandemic was killing many people around the world. Walker did not die but she did catch the disease and she had to be place in quarantine as she began a long recovery. After her recovery, Walker opened and ran Greenways, a school for twenty children aged 3 to 8 based in her home based on the Montessori method for 24 years. In the later afternoon she had other activities for herself. She would read the accounts of parliamentary debates and write letters where she could assist. She also wrote plays and one was performed in Adelaide in May 1933 at the Australian Federation of Women Voters conference. The play was called The Spring of Power and concerned how women had gained the vote. Her next play, Heritage: A Pageant of South Australia, was featured in the celebration of South Australia's bicentenary and it ran for ten sell-out performances. Her writing also included poetry and The silver wing and other poems was published in 1939.

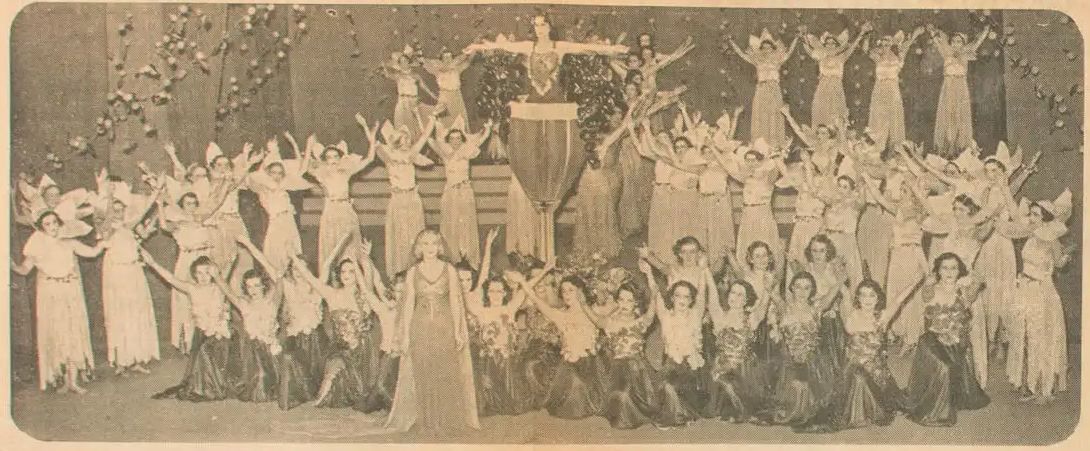
Ellinor Walker and Heather Gell created a Pageant in 1936 in Adelaide for the Women's Centenary Council

In 1940 The Guardianship of Infants Act was passed by the South Australia parliament. This act was almost entirely due to Walker. It was her research over eight years that enabled her to draft the text. Her draft was checked by lawyer Roma Mitchell and with one amendment it was adopted by the government as part of that year's legislation.

She joined the Women's Non-Party Political Association and remained an active member for 65 years. After the war she and the association were advocates for the League of Nations.

Walker was appointed an Officer of the Order of the British Empire in the 1971 Birthday Honours for service to the community.

Walker died in Norwood, South Australia in 1990. Ellinor Walker Street, in the Canberra suburb of Franklin, is named in her honour.
