= South Yarra =

Suburb of Melbourne in Victoria, Australia

- Suburb
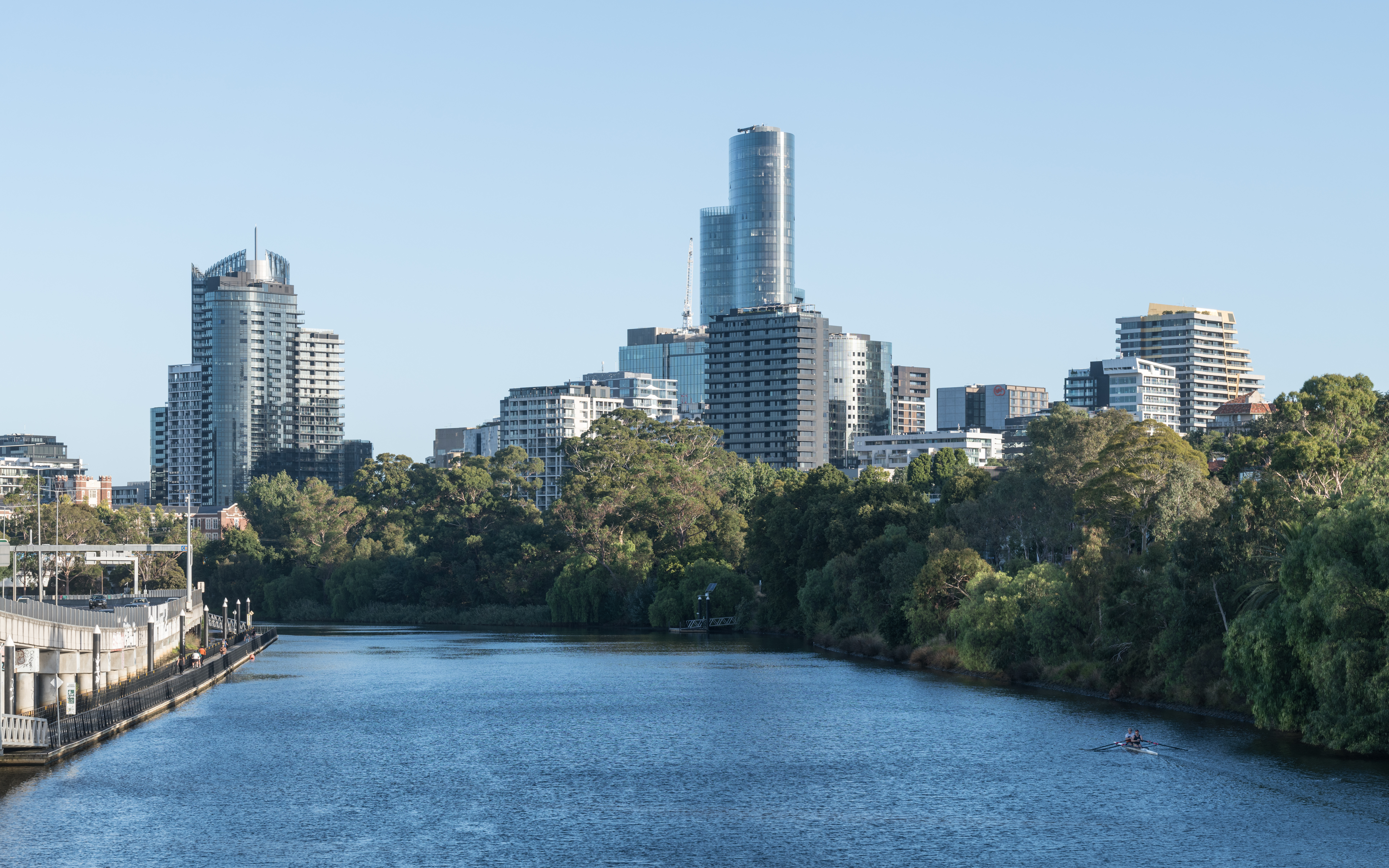
- South Yarra skyline, 2023

- Interactive map of South Yarra
- Coordinates: 37.840°S 144.989°E
- Country: Australia
- State: Victoria
- City: Melbourne
- LGAs: City of Melbourne; City of Stonnington
- Location: 4 km (2.5 mi) from Melbourne CBD
- Established: 1850s

Government
  - State electorate: Prahran
  - Federal division: Melbourne

Area
  - Total: 5 km^{2} (1.9 sq mi)
- Elevation: 21 m (69 ft)

Population
  - Total: 25,028 (SAL 2021)
- Postcode: 3141
Suburbs around South Yarra
Melbourne	Cremorne	Richmond
Melbourne	South Yarra	Toorak
St Kilda	Prahran	Armadale

South Yarra is an inner-city suburb in Melbourne, Victoria, Australia, 4 km south-east of Melbourne's Central Business District, located within the Cities of Melbourne and Stonnington local government areas. South Yarra recorded a population of 25,028 at the 2021 census.

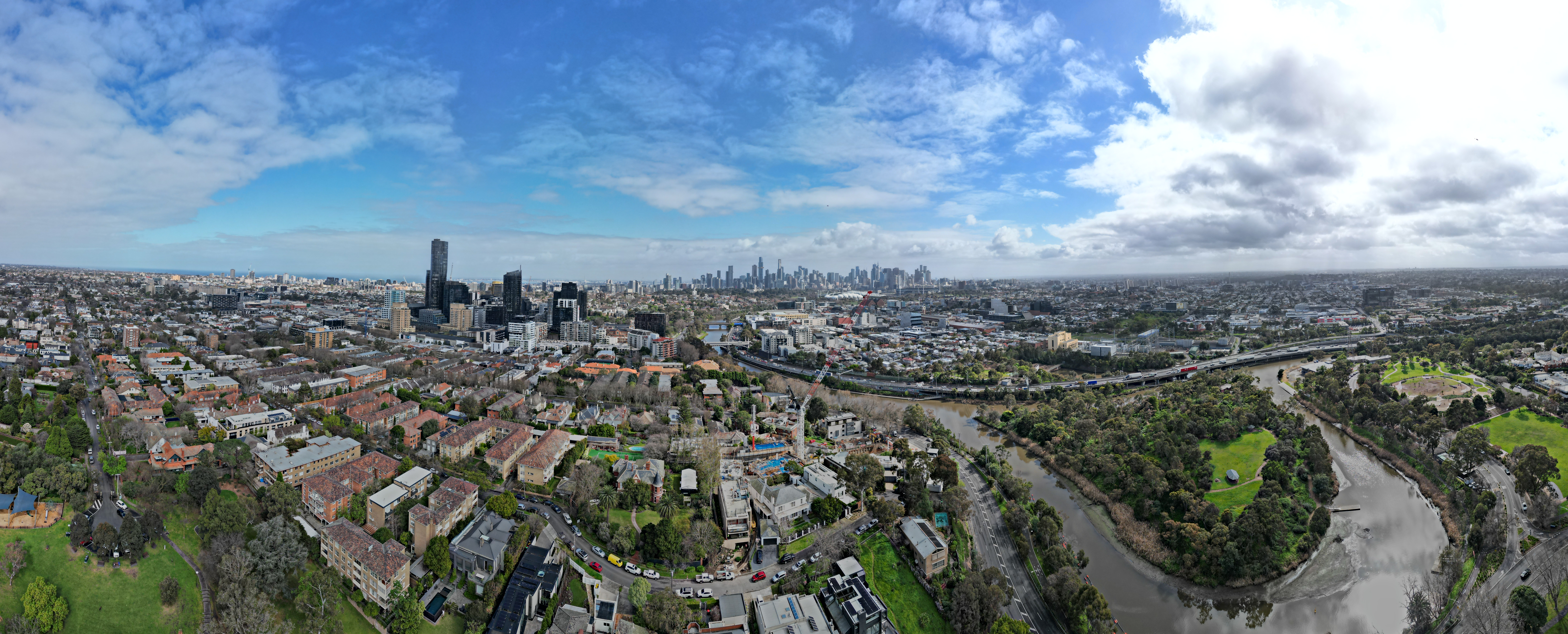
The Yarra River Birrarung meandering past South Yarra. September 2023.

Punt Road divides the suburb between Stonnington (east) and Melbourne (west). The main shopping region of South Yarra runs along Toorak Road and Chapel Street. Trade along these two arteries are focused on trendy and upmarket shopping, restaurants, nightclubs and cafe culture. The area of South Yarra centred along Commercial Road was for several decades one of Melbourne's gay villages.

== History ==
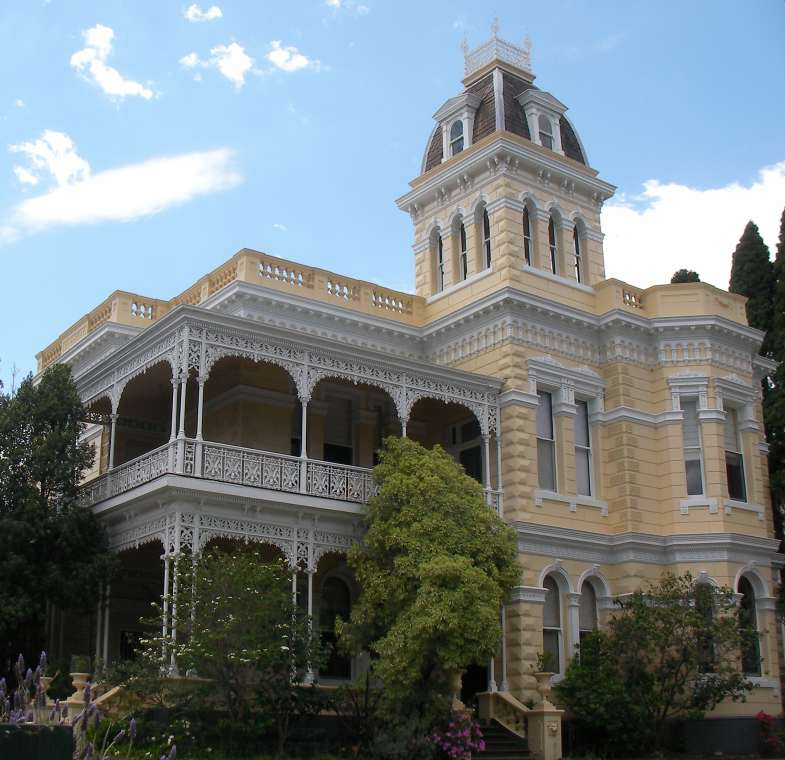
Goodrest mansion. Cnr Leopold Street and Toorak Road. South Yarra, Victoria.

South Yarra was originally inhabited by the Yalukit-willam clan of the Boonwurrung people who called the area Terneet, the meaning of which has been lost.

The area was settled by British colonists in the late 1830s, not long after the establishment of Melbourne. The first sale of land by the Crown in Prahran area took place on 10 June 1840 when land bounded by Kooyong Road, Gardiners Creek (Yarra River). Gardiners Creek Road (now Toorak Road) and Glenferrie Road was sold. The purchasers included Jane Hill (the widow of pastoralist David Hill), the Langhorne Bros. (the nephews of Captain William Lonsdale), Capt. John Browne, James Jackson and George Augustus Robinson who was the Chief Protector of Aborigines in the region.

During the 1840s, it became popular with wealthy citizens of Melbourne as a suburban retreat from the town. Several large houses were built and, together with neighbouring Toorak, it maintained its upper-class reputation into the post-World War II period. South Yarra Post Office was open briefly in 1854, then reopened on 21 June 1858.

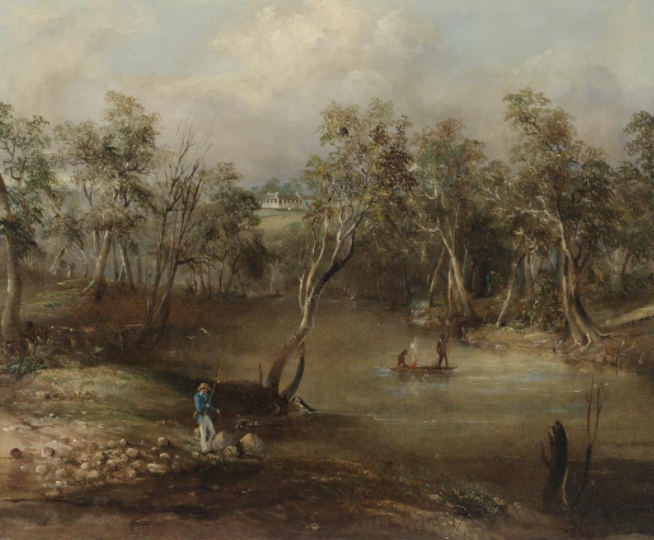
1847 painting of Terneet (South Yarra) by George Gilbert

Toorak Road looking west from the railway station in 1906

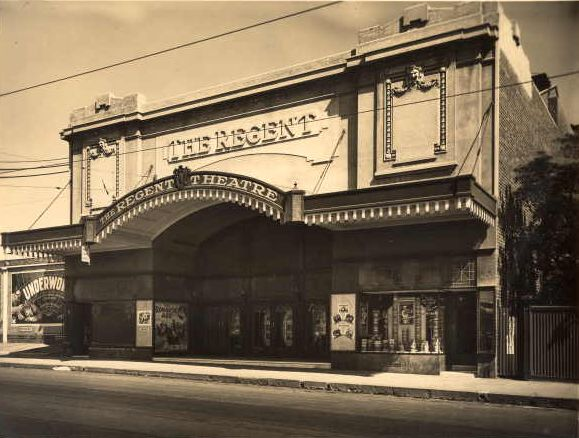
Regent Theatre on Toorak Road in 1927

During the 1920s and 1930s, many of the large gardens of the older mansions were subdivided and blocks of flats became a feature of the area. From the 1930s, the area around Park Street, where large numbers of flats had been built, became a popular neighbourhood for middle-class homosexuals; at that time an illegal subculture in the state of Victoria.

The building of apartment buildings, particularly around South Yarra railway station, continued into the 1960s and 1970s and today South Yarra is one of the most densely populated suburbs in Melbourne.

On 12 October 1988, police officers Steven Tynan and Damian Eyre were murdered in Walsh Street, South Yarra.

On 8 July 2002, the Salt nightclub in Daly Street was the site of a dispute which resulted in the murder of three men. On 19 September 2005, seven men were found guilty of murder, in the Supreme Court of Victoria. The nightclub was particularly notorious for criminal activity and was finally shut down.

== Population ==
In the 2016 census, there were 25,147 people in South Yarra. 51.1% of people were born in Australia. The next most common countries of birth were China 5.7%, England 4.5%, New Zealand 3.4%, India 2.2% and Malaysia 1.6%. 63.8% of people spoke only English at home. Other languages spoken at home included Mandarin 6.3%, Cantonese 1.6%, Greek 1.5%, Spanish 1.4% and Russian 1.4%. The most common responses for religion in South Yarra were No Religion 42.6% and Catholic 16.0%.

== Local landmarks ==
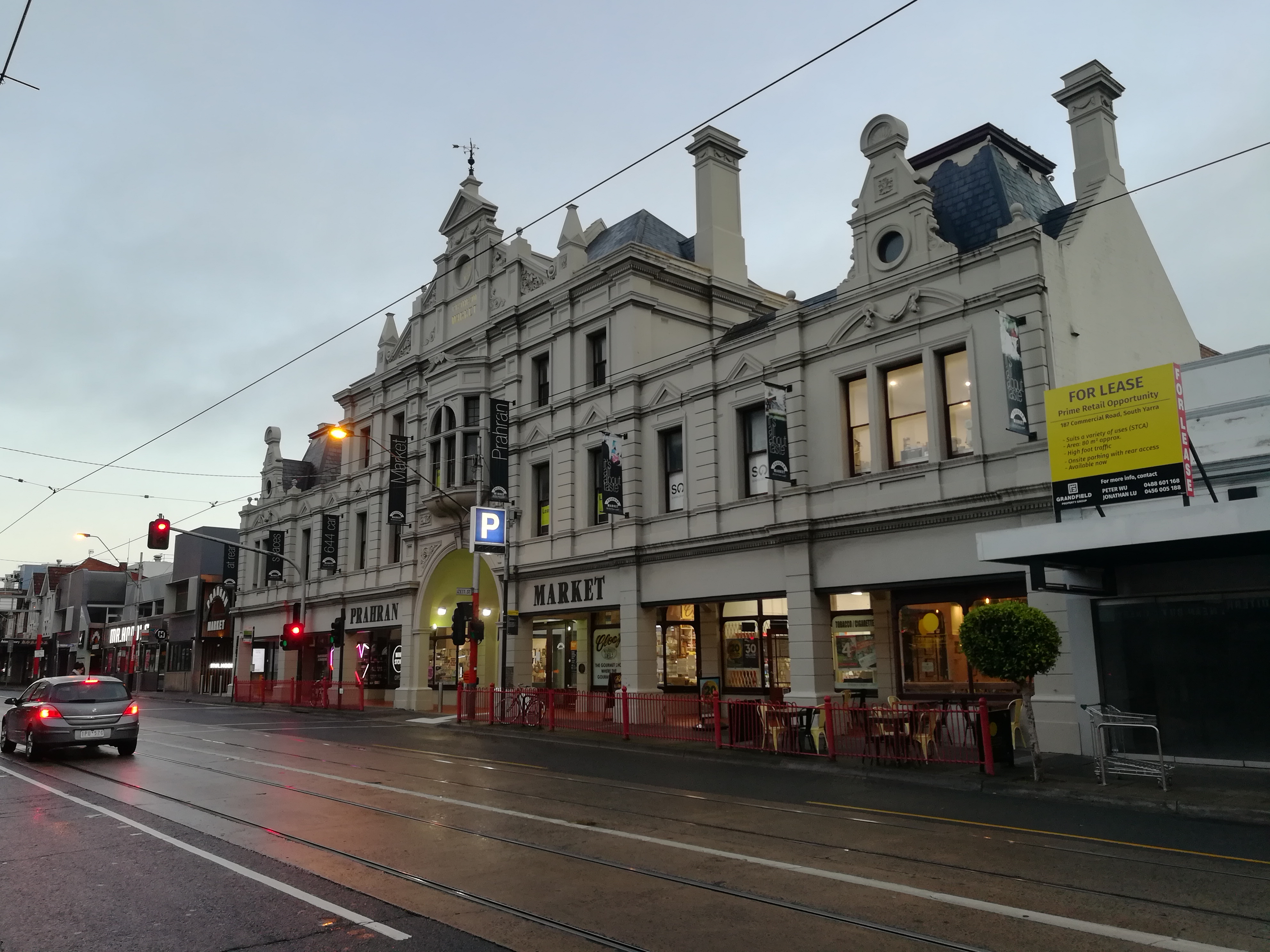
Prahran Market on Commercial Road

South Yarra has several local attractions. Perhaps the best known is Chapel Street. The South Yarra section of the famous street is the most fashionable and upmarket end. A major landmark is The Jam Factory, old factories converted into an upmarket shopping centre and cinemas. The Como Centre is a large shopping centre on the corner of Toorak and Chapel Streets, which combines with an office building, South Yarra's tallest, which houses the headquarters for ATV-10 and Global Television's TV production facilities.

The Prahran Market, located in South Yarra, is one of Melbourne's most popular and historic fresh produce markets.

Toorak Road runs off Chapel Street and although not known as well as Toorak Village, is a popular strip that contains a wide range of shops.

There are also several heritage registered buildings in South Yarra, including the Melbourne High School (1928), the former railway station building (1874) and post office (1893).

=== Residential architecture ===
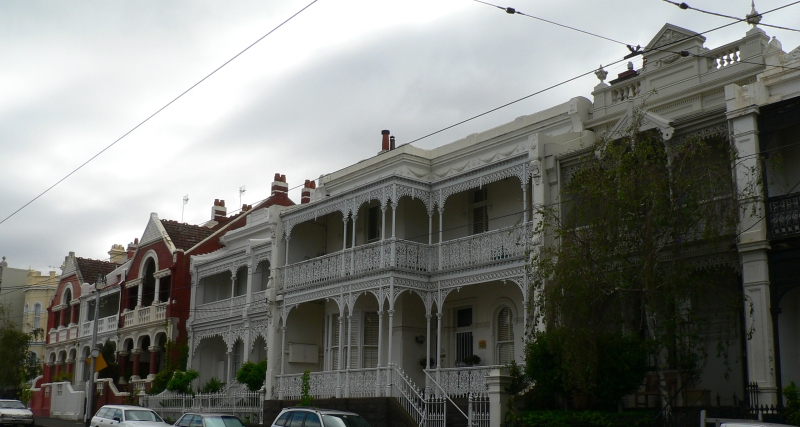
Park Street is known for its Victorian terrace houses.

Many historic mansions can be found in South Yarra. Heritage registered houses include Como House (1847), one of Melbourne's earliest mansions on its large estate on Williams Road, now owned by the National Trust and known for its long association with the Armytage family, Richmond House (1859), in Avoca Street, formerly home to Sir Rupert Clarke Bt, Barwon (1881) and Airlie House on Domain Road, once the townhouse of the Chirnside family of Werribee Park fame, which now serves as a leadership college for Victoria Police.

Other grand South Yarra houses include Wavendon, formerly home to film director Fred Schepisi, in Walsh Street, and Raveloe, in Domain Road, former home of Dame Mabel Brookes. Domain Road, with its proximity to the Kings Domain, the Royal Botanic Gardens and Government House, is at the centre of the exclusive Domain precinct. Fairbairn, built for the pastoralist Fairbairn family and the next-door property, Poolman House, on the corner of Domain Road and Punt Road, are among the largest mansions in South Yarra. Poolman House, originally known as Ernest Poolman House, was built by stock and station agent Richard Goldsbrough in 1865 and extended in 1880. Poolman House was owned by the Poolman family from 1921, who entertained grandly in the ballroom that they added in 1928. In 1956 Mrs Audrey Poolman donated the house to Christ Church South Yarra, who used it as a nursing home for genteel old Anglican ladies for thirty years, until in 1986, the house was bought from the Church of England by international interior designer the late John Coote, who restored Poolman House at vast expense. Snainton at 80 Clowes Street, South Yarra, is a notable example of grand Federation architecture, as is its sister property at 72 Clowes Street, South Yarra, which sold for a notable $8.8 million in 2008. Caroline House, a Victorian mansion with a tower at 72 Caroline Street, changed hands in 2014 by way of off market transaction for $12.5 million. Caroline House was formerly home to Australia's foremost art dealer Joseph Brown who between 1966 and 1999 gifted 154 works of art valued at $30 million to the National Gallery of Victoria.

South Yarra also has some notable clusters of terrace house. Park Street features rows of Melbourne's best preserved, richly decorated and highly sought-after Victorian terrace houses, some as high as three and four storeys. Adjacent Leopold Street has a highly original Victorian streetscape being lined on both sides by Victorian terraces built during the 1880s land boom. Domain Road, Toorak Road West (overlooking Fawkner Park), Surrey Road as well as Darling and Caroline Streets are also known for their double-storey late 19th century terraces.

An important area for Art Deco enthusiasts can be found along Alexandra Avenue, Lawson Grove and Darling Street. This area was subject to renewal in the 1920s and 1930s by entrepreneurial builder Mr Lawson, as a kind of medium-density village enclave development. As a result, a large number of Art Deco apartment buildings were built in a Hollywood Hills style overlooking the Yarra River. One of the most famous of these apartment buildings, "Beverly Hills", on Darling Street, retains the original 1930s grotto-style swimming pool for the use of all residents. Nearby in Lawson Grove the Lawson Grove Café can be found on the ground floor of a 1930s Art Deco building. It was originally intended to run as a convenience store for local residents, but is now a chic café for those in the know.

The Beverley Hills Apartment Block is a 1930s development in the Spanish Mission style.

=== Places of worship ===
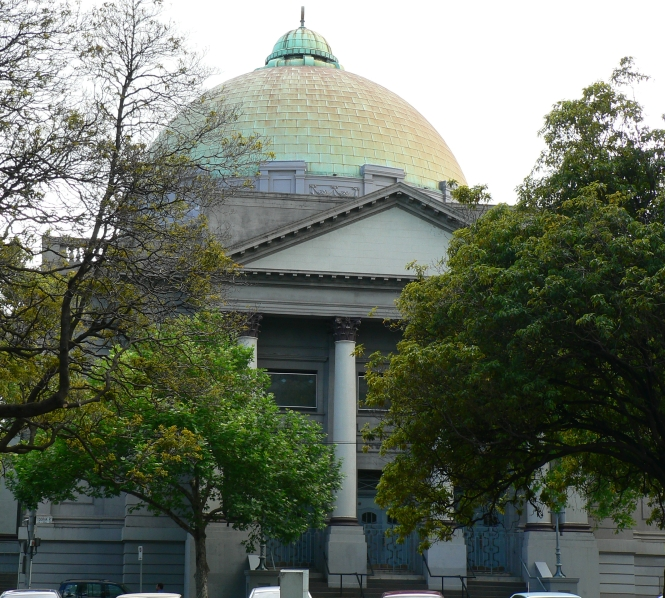
Melbourne Synagogue (b. 1929)

The synagogue of the Melbourne Hebrew Congregation, which was built in 1929 to the design of Nahum Barnet, features a giant order portico and a great copper dome. It is the largest synagogue structure in Australasia.

Christ Church is an historic Anglican church located on the corner of Toorak and Punt Roads. Its tall spire is a landmark. There are several smaller churches secluded in the back streets of South Yarra.

=== Public space ===
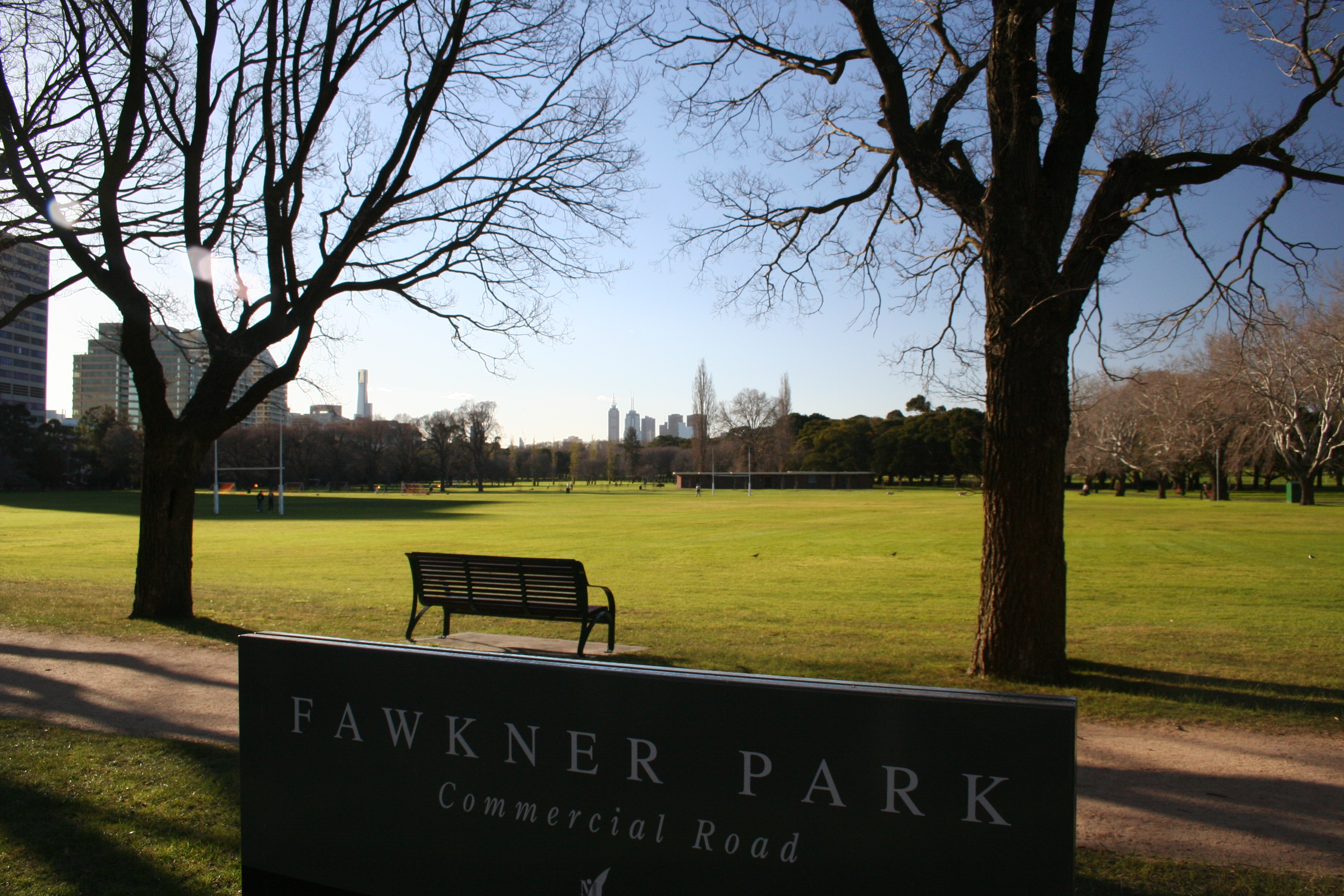
Fawkner Park entrance looking north west toward St Kilda Road

South Yarra's parks and gardens include part of the Royal Botanic Gardens, Fawkner Park (large park bordered by offices on St Kilda Road, private residences off Punt Road, Commercial Road and Toorak Road, featuring recreational facilities and grand avenues of trees) and smaller gardens such as the former Greville Botanic Gardens, Como Gardens and the public housing open space.

== Transport ==
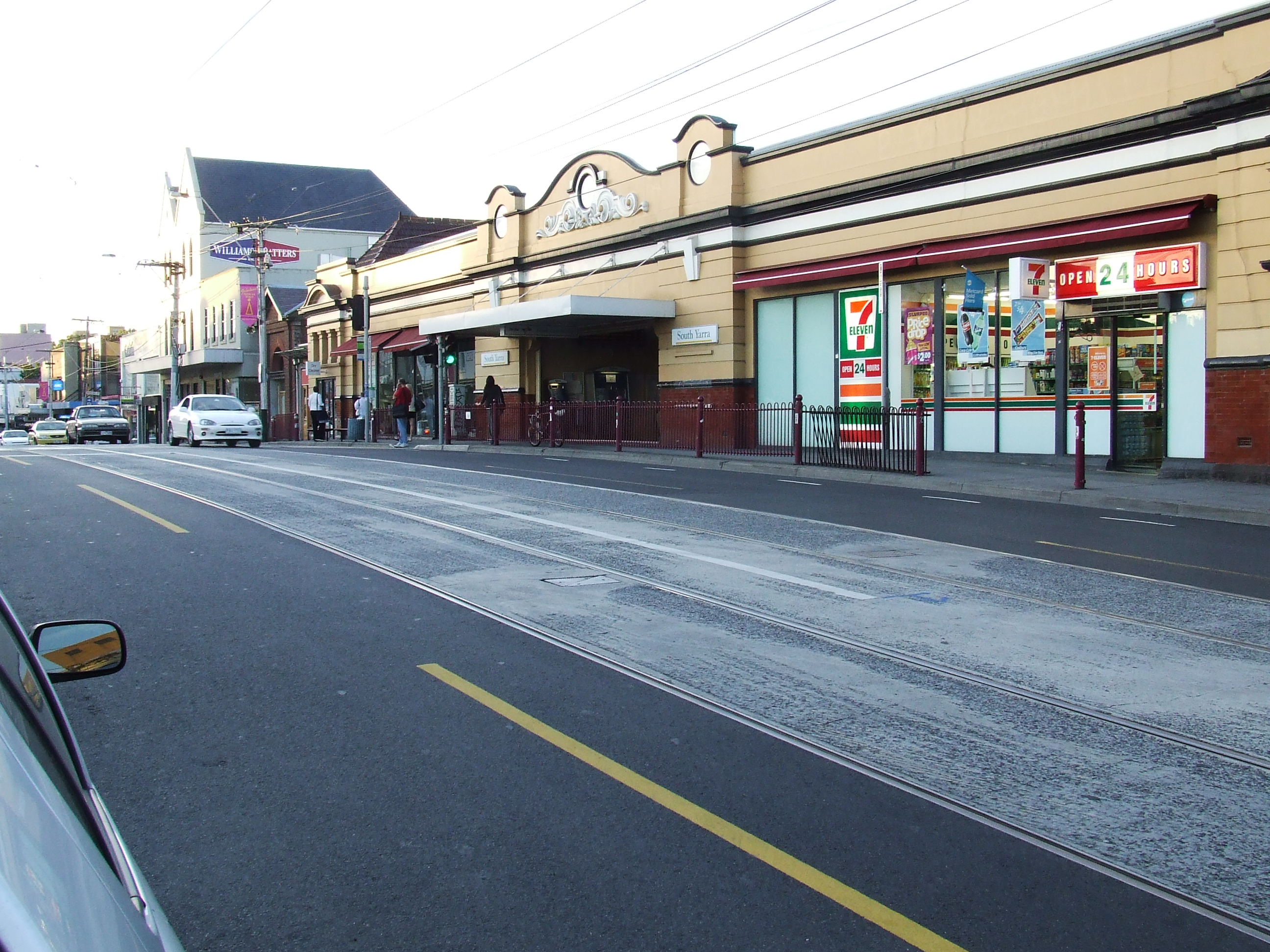
South Yarra station entrance

South Yarra has two railway stations. South Yarra station is on the Frankston and Sandringham lines and is the junction for the two lines. Hawksburn station is on the Frankston line and serves the eastern part of the suburb.

Tram routes 58, 72 and 78 also run through South Yarra.

Major bus routes run along Commercial Road and Punt Road.

== Education ==
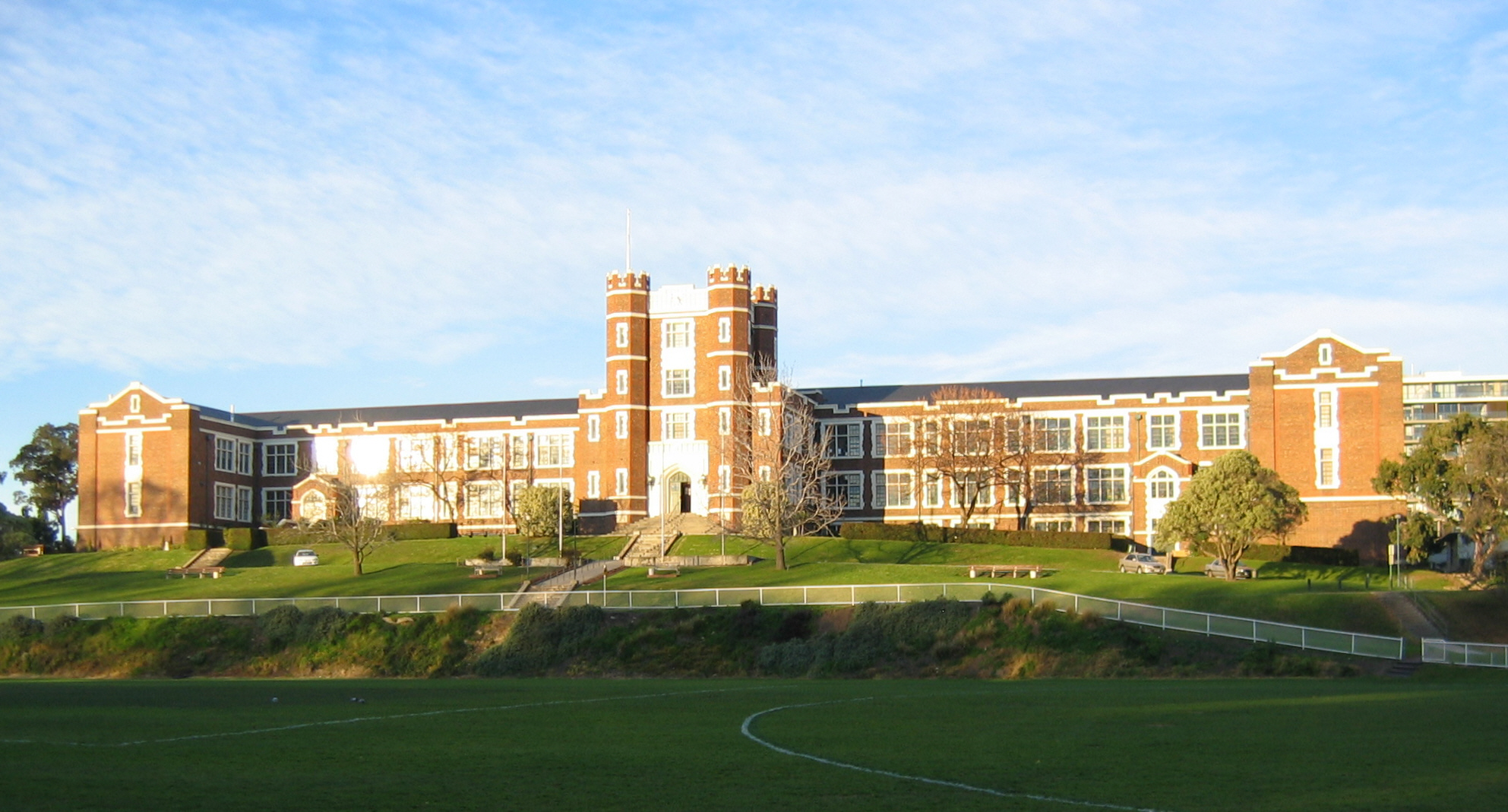
Melbourne High School building on Forrest Hill, South Yarra

Melbourne High School is located in South Yarra, and the 1930s Gothic main building is a local landmark. Melbourne Girls Grammar School Merton Hall campus is located in Anderson Street South Yarra, opposite the Royal Botanical Gardens, while its junior school, Morris Hall, is in Caroline Street South Yarra. Melbourne Grammar School (boys only at senior level) occupies an entire block bounded by Domain Road, St Kilda Road, Domain Street and Bromby Street. It has historic and grand bluestone buildings. In addition, Melbourne Grammar owns many of the terrace houses in Domain Street to provide accommodation for its masters, as well as the grand Victorian terrace house in Domain Road, Creswick House, home to its middle school boarders.

Christ Church Grammar School and South Yarra Primary School, two of Victoria's oldest primary schools, are also located in South Yarra.

== Liveability ==
A 2005 report called Liveable Melbourne that was commissioned by The Age and conducted by Tract Consultants and ACIL Tasman, ranked Melbourne suburbs and assigned them scores on fourteen characteristics such as crime, CBD proximity, and traffic congestion. The report found that of all Melbourne suburbs, South Yarra was the most liveable due to good proximity to the CBD, schools, cafes, and restaurants; access to trains, trams, and buses; and abundance of open spaces and trees.

== Localities in South Yarra ==
Hawksburn is a locality in the eastern part of South Yarra, bordering Toorak. It is probably best known for its railway station and nearby "Hawksburn Village", a small strip shopping centre on Malvern Road. Many of South Yarra's older homes and terraces are located close to Cromwell Crescent and the Hawksburn railway station. Hawksburn Post Office opened in 1890.

The Domain Precinct is the most prestigious part of South Yarra, traditionally home to many of Melbourne's old money families. Bordered by Punt Road, Toorak Road West, Anderson Street, St Kilda Road and Alexandra Avenue, the Domain Precinct has recorded some of Victoria's highest land values on a square metre basis. Driven by proximity to Government House, the Central Business District and the Botanical Gardens, Fawkner Park, and Melbourne's elite private schools and boutique shopping, this area is graced with both large mansions, terrace houses and high-end apartments. The most valuable streets include Walsh Street, Fairlie Court, Park Street, Clowes Street, Anderson Street, Domain Road and Marne Street.

== Sport ==
The South Yarra Football Club, an Australian rules football team, competes in the Southern Football League.

The Melbourne High School Old Boys Football Club have three teams that compete in the Victorian Amateur Football Association. Their home ground is based at Melbourne High School, where weekly matches are played on the Woodfull-Miller oval, the school's sole football oval.

There are two tennis clubs, both of which are over 100 years old. Royal South Yarra which is a large club having both grass and en-tout-cas courts and Hawksburn Tennis Club in the heart of South Yarra with 3 en-tout-cas courts. Courts are also available for public hire at Fawkner Park, Prahran Community Centre and Orrong Park.

== Notable citizens ==
- Claire Adams – Canadian silent film actress, who had a townhouse in Domain Road during the 1940s, 50s & 60s.
- Joseph Anderson (Commandant) – Soldier, penal administrator and politician who was a resident of South Yarra in the 1850s.
- Graham Berry – Colonial politician, and 11th Premier of Victoria; general storekeeper in South Yarra in the 1850s.
- Sir Robert Blackwood – The first Chancellor of Monash University, born in South Yarra in 1906.
- Thomas Brentnall – Accountant and musician, lived at Newnham, Caroline Street, from 1880.
- Mabel Brookes – Community worker and activist, who was president of the Queen Victoria Hospital from 1923 to 1970, lived in South Yarra with her tennis playing husband Norman Brookes.
- Norman Brookes – Australian tennis champion who died in South Yarra in 1968.
- Rupert Bunny – Australian painter who lived much of his life in France, but returned and settled in South Yarra in the 1930s.
- Len Darling – Australian cricketer who was born in South Yarra in 1909.
- Alfred Deakin – Second Prime Minister of Australia; lived at "Llanarth" in Walsh Street from 1887.
- Dorothy Jean Hailes (1926–1988) – menopause doctor, forebear of the Australasian Menopausal society
- Ellinor Gertrude Walker, Australian teacher.
- Lorna Hodgkinson – Educator, born in South Yarra in 1887.
- James Alan George Housden – Vicar of Christ Church, South Yarra, from 1946 to 1947.
- Edmund Lind – Medical professional and soldier.
- Major General Herbert Lloyd – Australian soldier, born in South Yarra in 1883.
- Sir Keith Murdoch – Resided in Walsh Street for many years.
- Vernon Ransford – Australian Test cricketer born in South Yarra in 1885.
- Lieutenant General Sir Stanley Savige – Australian Army soldier who played a key role in the establishment of Legacy Australia, lived in South Yarra from 1907.
- Robert Potter (1831-1908), lived in South Yarra from 1858 - his death in 1908.
- Ethel Spowers (1890–1947), Australian artist, born at South Yarra.
- Gerard Kennedy Tucker – Founder of the Brotherhood of St Laurence, born in South Yarra in 1885.

== See also ==
- City of Prahran – South Yarra was previously within this former local government area.
