= John Gell =

John Gell may refer to:

- Sir John Gell, 1st Baronet (1592–1671), Parliamentarian in the English Civil War
- Sir John Gell, 2nd Baronet (1612–1689), lead mining magnate and MP for Derbyshire
- John Eyre Gell (died 1739), known as John Eyre before inheriting the Gell estate and mines, see Gell baronets
- John Gell (admiral) (1740–1806), British admiral
- John Gell (Manx language activist) (1899–1983)

== See also ==
- Gell baronets
- Gell (surname)
