= Fawkner Park, Melbourne =

Park in South Yarra, Melbourne, Australia

Fawkner Park
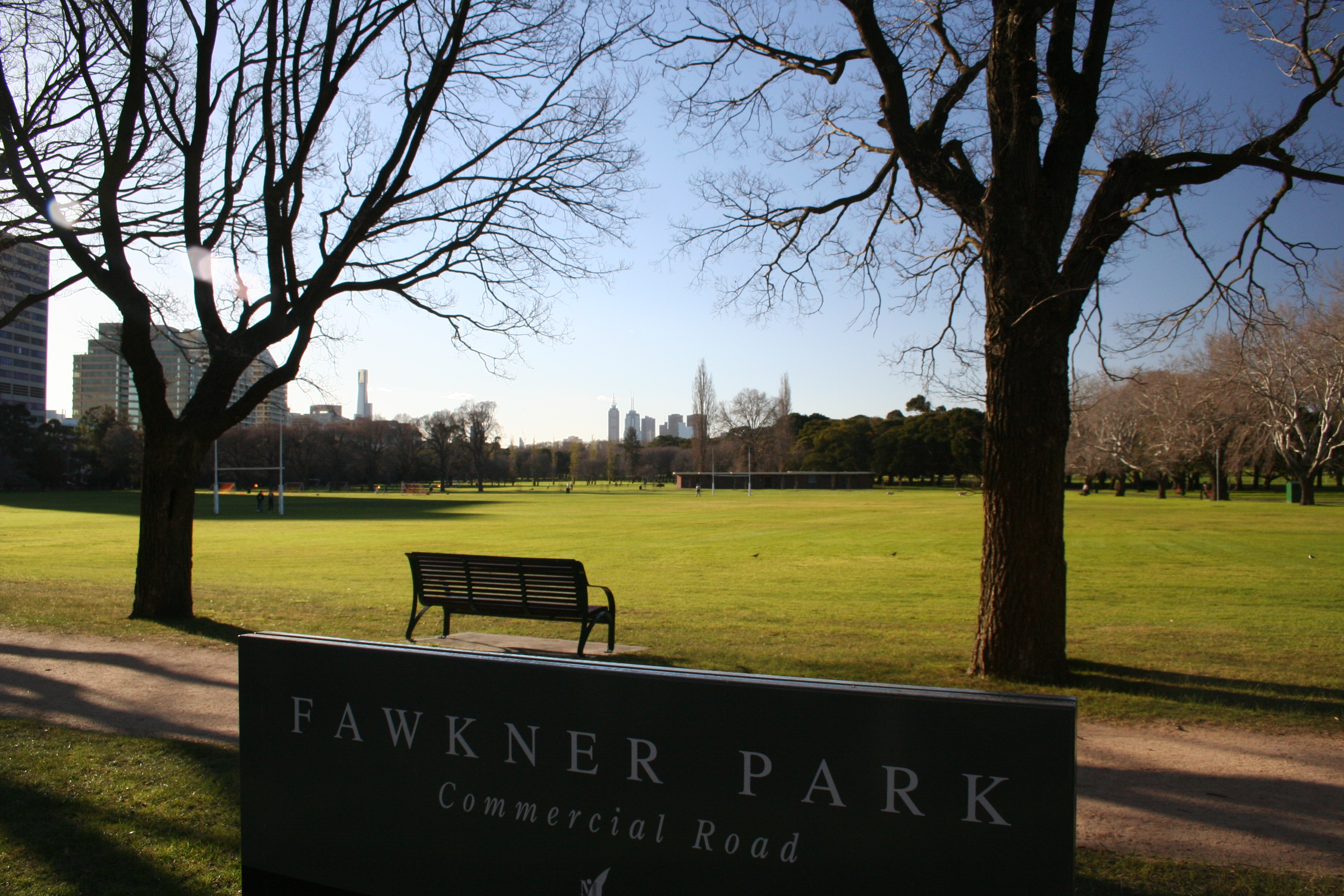
- The park, with Melbourne city centre in the background

- Location within Melbourne
- Interactive map of Fawkner Park
- Type: Urban park
- Location: South Yarra, Melbourne, Victoria, Australia
- Coordinates: 37°50′28″S 144°58′55″E
- Area: 41 ha (100 acres)
- Opened: 1848; 178 years ago
- Designer: Nicholas Bickford
- Etymology: John Pascoe Fawkner
- Owner: Government of Victoria (as Crown land)
- Operator: City of Melbourne
- Status: Open
- Paths: Sealed
- Terrain: Flat; riverbank
- Vegetation: Australian natives; lawns; European gardens
- Public transit: –; – bus routes; –
- Landmarks: Fawkner Park Tennis Centre
- Facilities: Barbecues; cafe; community centre; drinking fountain; picnic facilities; playgrounds (x3); seating; sports grounds; tennis courts; toilets
- Website: melbourne.vic.gov.au

Victorian Heritage Register
- Official name: Fawkner Park
- Type: Registered place
- Criteria: A, C, & E
- Designated: 1 September 2016
- Reference no.: H2361
- Heritage overlay no.: HO6
- Categories: Military; Parks, Gardens and Trees; Recreation and Entertainment

Fawkner Park is a 41-hectare (101-acre) urban park and sports ground located in Melbourne's South Yarra and part of the City of Melbourne. It provides recreational areas for teams playing cricket, softball, soccer, Australian rules football, tennis, quadball and rugby.

The park is located on the traditional lands of the Bunurong and is managed by the City of Melbourne. The park was added to the Victorian Heritage Register on 1 September 2016 in recognition of its historical, archaeological aesthetic significance.

== Description ==
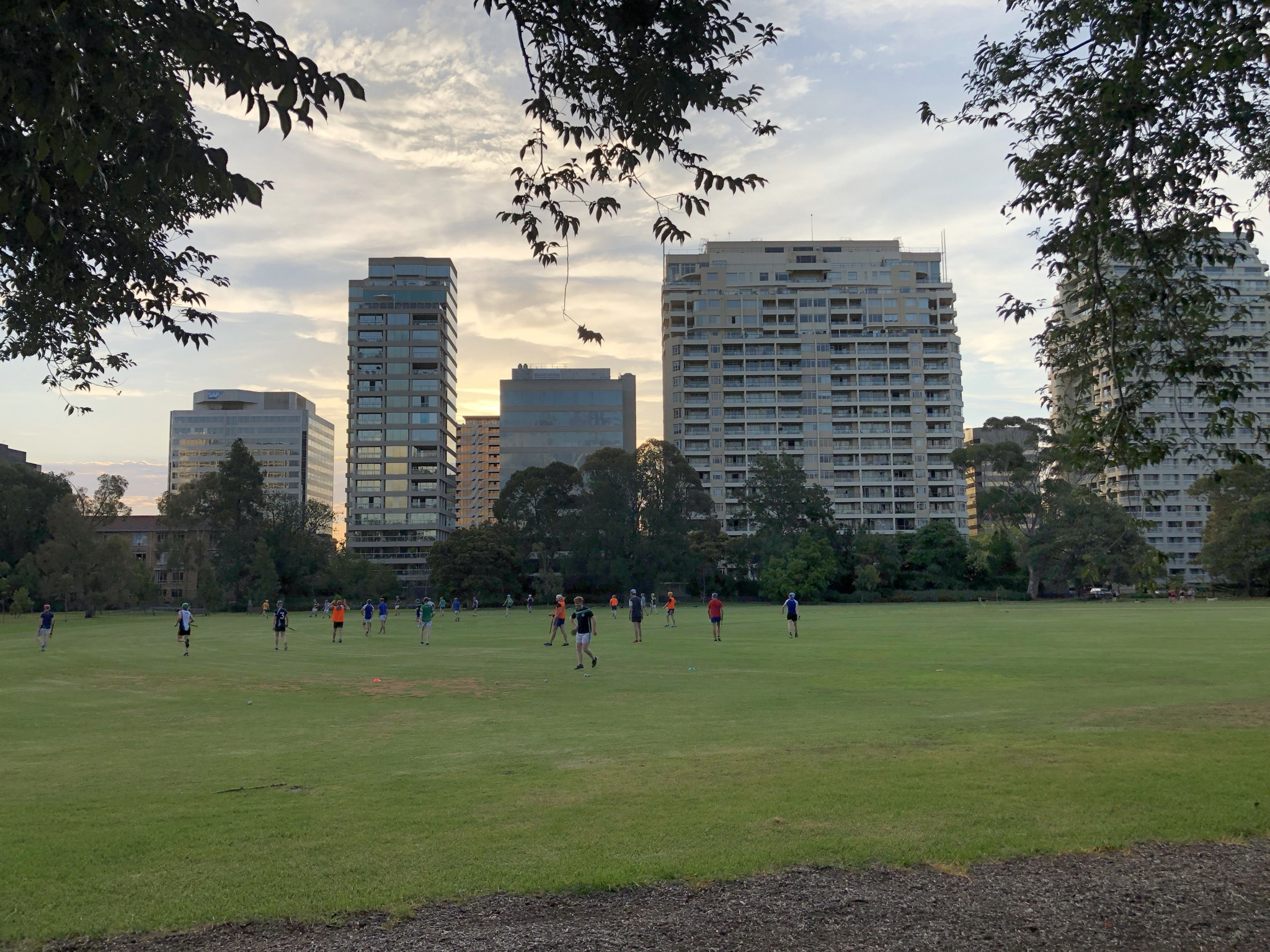
Sport in the park, January 2019

Named in honour of John Pascoe Fawkner, a co-founder of Melbourne, the park was created in 1862.

It is trapezoidal in shape, gently sloping towards a flat area, and was originally used for over seven different activities at one time, in sections specified for the purpose. It was also commonly used for walks and promenading. The layout, designed by Nicholas Bickford, remains similar to that of the late 1870s, with pathways cutting through the park, edged with elm, oak and Moreton Bay figs.

Summer weekend cricket matches have an English 'village green' atmosphere, with spectators making use of the free on-site barbecues and picnic areas. During World War II, part of the park was used by the Defence Department, and softball facilities were incorporated, encouraged by the presence of American servicemen. After the war, the buildings were converted to a transit camp for migrants which closed in 1955.

Since the 1960s, the park was used extensively for a wide range of team sports as well as more passive recreational use.

== See also ==
- Parks and gardens of Melbourne
- Heritage gardens in Australia
- List of heritage-listed buildings in Melbourne
