= Mary Gell =

Medical missionary

Mary Gell M.B.Ch.B.
- Born: 16 April 1894
- Died: 1978 (aged 83–84)
- Education: University of Sheffield
- Occupation: Doctor of medicine
- Known for: Co-founder of War on Want
- Medical career
- Profession: Medical missionary
- Institutions: St. Agatha's Hospital, North China

Dr Mary Prowse Gell MB, ChB (16 April 1894 – 1978) was a Manx medical missionary and co-founder of War on Want. She worked at St. Agatha's Hospital, Pingyin, Shandong, China, and later became an associate professor at the University Hospital, Jinan's Department of Obstetrics and Gynaecology. After World War II, she settled in London and became Secretary to the Medical Missions Department of the Society for the Propagation of the Gospel.

== Early life and education ==
Gell was the daughter of Evan Gell and Helena Prowse, who died when she was fourth and three months old respectively. Her paternal grandfather was John Gell MHK. Gell spent her early life with her maternal grandmother before being raised by her paternal uncle Dr Harry/Henry Gell at Victoria House in Peel alongside her cousin Joyce Gell. She helped her uncle at his dispensary.

Gell graduated from the University of Sheffield, M.B.Ch.B., in 1922.

== Later life ==
At age 70 in 1964, Gell returned to the Isle of Man, where she settled in Ramsey.
