= Alan Gell =

American wrongfully convicted of murder

James Alan Gell (born June 30, 1974, in North Carolina) is an American who was wrongfully convicted of first-degree murder in 1998 and sentenced to death in Bertie County, North Carolina, at the age of 22. He served nine years as an inmate on death row before being acquitted in a second trial in 2004; he was freed from prison and exonerated that year. He was the 113th person to be freed from death row in the United States.

The State Superior Court determined that the prosecution had withheld significant exculpatory evidence and impeachment evidence in the first trial. It overturned the conviction in 2002, and remanded the case to the lower court for a new trial. Gell was acquitted in 2004 in his second trial and freed from prison, receiving a full exoneration that year. As a result of this case, the state legislature passed a law affecting every felony case in the state; it requires "prosecutors to share their entire file with defendants, a change designed to prevent the misconduct that put Gell on death row."

Gell struggled to build his life after he gained freedom, even as he became a spokesman for the anti-death penalty movement. He was charged with statutory rape and possession of cocaine in 2006; he pleaded guilty and was sentenced to five years. In 2009 the state and SBI insurers paid a civil suit settlement of $3.9 million to Gell over his 1998 wrongful conviction for murder and years of imprisonment on death row.

== Background ==
Gell's parents divorced when he was young. His mother Jeannette remarried, to Joel Johnson, with whom she had a daughter Frankie. Gell got into trouble as a youth, smoking marijuana and using cocaine, and selling cocaine to support his habit.

== The murder ==
Allen Ray Jenkins, age 56, was found dead on April 14, 1995, in his home in Aulander, North Carolina. He had been shot twice in the chest with a shotgun. In the days and weeks after the murder, the police talked to several disinterested witnesses who said they had seen Jenkins alive as late as April 10.

Jenkins' brother, Sidney Jenkins, as well as his neighbor, Mary Hunt, recalled seeing him on April 8, 1995. Edward and Margaret Adams reported seeing Jenkins on April 9, 1995, while out for a walk. Jenkins was seen in Ahoskie on April 10 by a former coworker, a restaurant waitress, and a man who said he sold a dozen herring to Jenkins on that date.

By Sidney Jenkins' account, his brother Allen Jenkins had a weakness for “underage girls”. Allen had been convicted in 1990 of statutory rape of a 14-year-old girl in Ahoskie, North Carolina. He was imprisoned for six months after pleading guilty to two counts of indecent liberties with a minor.

When police searched Jenkins' house after being notified of his death, they saw a baking pan of fish and an open container of wine coolers, indicating he had received guests earlier that day. They learned that he was seeing Crystal Morris, who was fifteen years old. She and her friend Shanna Hall, also 15, were very close at the time and often went to the Jenkins house to drink. They were initially suspects in the murder and were charged with first-degree murder.

When the police questioned them after Jenkins' death, Hall and Morris showed officers where Gell had allegedly hidden the guns used in the shooting. Their accounts changed several times and they implicated Gell, Hall's boyfriend, in the murder.

The prosecutor offered each of them a plea deal in exchange for testifying against Gell at trial. They each pleaded guilty to second-degree murder and were sentenced to ten years in prison.

Both testified that they saw Gell shooting Jenkins with a shotgun on April 3. They testified during Gell's first trial in 1998 that Jenkins had invited them over for wine coolers. The state relied on Morris and Hall to testify against Gell in his trial. The girls testified that Hall had called Gell, asking him to come to Allen Jenkins' house to help Hall and Morris rob Jenkins.

Gell was indicted August 7, 1995, on charges of first degree murder, conspiracy to commit murder, armed robbery, and conspiracy to commit armed robbery. He was convicted at a 1998 jury trial and sentenced to death by Bertie County Superior Court for the crime of first degree murder later that same year.

== Appeal and second trial ==
While on death row, Gell appealed his conviction; it was denied in 1998 by the state appeals court. But in 2002 his attorneys gained a hearing by a State Superior Court judge after arguing that prosecutors had withheld key evidence in the case.

The defense alleged that the police withheld eyewitness information from the forensic pathologist, Dr. Mary Garvin Fransioli Gilliland, which affected her estimate of the date of death. Gilliland said that, if the prosecutors had told her about the numerous sightings of Jenkins by eyewitnesses on April 8 and April 9, she would have predicted that Jenkins had died closer to April 14 than to the date of April 3, which she had testified to in Gell's trial. Prosecutors had recorded more than 17 sightings of Jenkins by witnesses that took place after April 3.

The defense also told the court that, during this revised period of two weeks in early April when the crime was likely committed, Gell had been out of state or serving a sentence in jail after having been arrested for stealing a car. The State Superior Court overturned his conviction and remanded the case to the Bertie County Superior Court, ordering a new trial for Gell.

The second trial went to the jury for a verdict on February 18, 2004. They had heard evidence that 17 eyewitnesses saw Jenkins after April 3, which was the date that prosecutors said Gell killed him. In addition, they heard a tape recording by Crystal Morris saying that she had to make up a story to tell the police. Jurors deliberated 2½ hours before returning a verdict of not guilty and acquitting Gell of the 1995 murder of Allen Ray Jenkins.

Gell is the 113th person (as of November 29, 2010) to be freed from death row in the United States.

== Aftermath ==
Gell struggled in his life after having been in prison for several years. He went to community college but dropped out. He became an anti-death penalty activist, speaking out about this cause. The years following his release were marked with a number of problematic relationships and subsequent legal consequences.

In April 2006, Gell was charged with the statutory rape of a former girlfriend (who was 15 years old when she got pregnant by him) and possession of cocaine. He pleaded guilty and was sentenced to five years in prison. Gell apologized to the judge and to Harris and her mother. He committed to helping raise the son he had with Harris. The former girlfriend, Olivia Harris, age 17 at the time of Gell's trial, said, "It was consensual, it was a relationship, and I was two months from being 16 [the age of sexual consent for a young woman in North Carolina] when I got pregnant. I think it's bullcrap. The only reason they're doing it is for all these things that happened years ago."

The Gell appeals, second trial, and 2004 acquittal for the Jenkins murder, attracted media attention across the state and nationally. Such prosecutorial misconduct of suppressing exculpatory evidence as took place in the 1995 Gell trial had been ruled unconstitutional by the US Supreme Court in Brady v. Maryland (1963). The North Carolina legislature strengthened its protection of defendants by passing a law that requires prosecutors in all felony cases to "share their entire file with defendants, a change designed to prevent the misconduct that put Gell on death row."

Gell's attorneys filed a civil suit against the state for wrongful conviction and imprisonment. In 2009 the state and the SBI insurers settled with Gell, paying him $3.9 million.

After his release in 2011, Gell developed a relationship with a former friend. He and Angel Wilson married in February 2015, combining their families. She is an accountant with a college degree and has full custody of her four children from a previous marriage.

== See also ==
- Brady violation
- List of wrongful convictions in the United States
- Overturned convictions in the United States
- Prosecutorial misconduct
- List of United States death row inmates
