= Harry Dickson Gell =

Harry Dickson Gell (Note: His surname is pronounced as "jell".) SM FCPA (17 April 1845 – 17 February 1929) was an accountant in South Australia.

== History ==
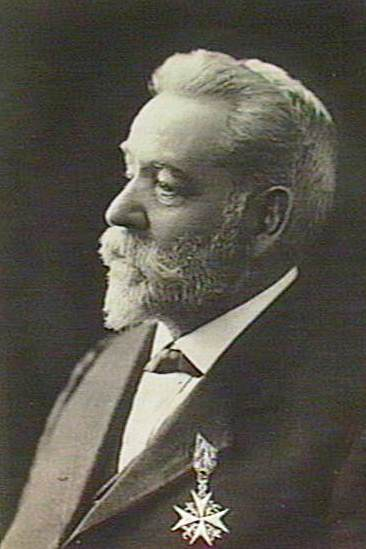
Harry Dickson Gell, mayor of Glenelg 1884

Gell was born in Chelsea, England, the third son of Charles (died 12 September 1905) and Arabella Gell, née Dixon, who emigrated to South Australia aboard John Munn in September 1849 with their three sons Charles (c. 1841 – 12 September 1905), Richard (c. 1842 – 22 May 1929) and Harry. Charles Gell, who had some experience at the firm of Morewood & Rogers, opened a hardware store in Hindley Street specializing in galvanized tin ironware. He then left for the goldfields of Victoria, but had no luck and lost most of his assets and capital.

Nothing has been found of Harry Dickson Gell's early years. At age 13 he was employed at Hamilton Brothers' store at Port Adelaide. Around 1860 he was in Wallaroo. Later he was in partnership as storekeepers in Kadina with Robert Newman Wells as Wells & Gell; proved insolvent 1865. In 1866 he was in Robe, working for Ormerod & Co., shipping agents; he married in 1867.

By 1870 he was in Adelaide working as a clerk and debt collector for Kingsborough & Chapman; in 1874 secretary to the City Permanent Building and Investment Society. By 1878 was in business for himself as a liquidator with offices in Gresham Chambers, Pirie Street, Adelaide.

From 1878 he was a public accountant, land broker, and estate agent with both home and offices in Shannon Street, Glenelg.

== Other interests ==
Gell was

- a friend of Adam Lindsay Gordon and was present at the horseman-poet's Grand Steeplechase win at the SAJC's "Thebarton" course on Cadger in 1865.
- in 1868 foundation honorary secretary of the Robe Institute
- a member of the Robe Rifle Club in 1869
- associated with the Norwood Baptist Church in the late 1870s
- a Glenelg Councillor in 1881 then Mayor of Glenelg 1884
- a member of the Glenelg Literary Association and its president in 1887
- a member of the South Australian Literary Societies' Union and its president in 1893. He was also involved in its Union Parliament.
- a Freemason, a member of the MacDonnell Lodge, No. 10, Glenelg.
- appointed Justice of the Peace in 1884 and Special Magistrate 1899. He was author of The Magistrate's Guide, published 1906, still in use 1924.
- in 1898 a foundation member of the Justices' Association, and president three times. The Association was formed in response to the loss of status accorded the position as a result of many unsuitable individuals having the title thrust upon them.
- a trustee, State Bank of South Australia in 1902 and chairman of trustees c. 1920
- a member of the St. John Ambulance Association, and longtime chairman and treasurer, for which he was made an Esquire of the Order of the Hospital of St. John of Jerusalem, in 1921.
- a member of the Public Library Board.
- for 20 years president of Adelaide Co-operative Society, Limited.

== Family ==
He married Emma Jane Hooper (c. 1848 – 4 April 1888) of Kadina on 25 September 1867.

- Rose Mabel Gell (17 July 1868 – 1956)
- Harry Hooper Gell (16 March 1870 – 20 February 1956) married Florenia Campbell Muirhead "Renna" Nairn ( –1959) of Kapunda on 19 October 1904. He was manager, Bank of Adelaide

- Florenia Emma Gell (1906–
- Robert Dickson Gell (1908–1955) married Nancy Emmie Spring in 1935
- Ruth Nairn Gell (1916– ) acolyte of Heather Gell
- Mary Le Vance Gell (1925–

- Florence Arabella Dickson "Flo A. D." Gell (12 March 1872 – 1 February 1902)
- Annie Gell (1874– ) married Frank Oscar Hill ( – ) in 1913
- Francis "Frank" Edgar (1876–1884)
- Charles "Charlie" Gell (1878–1880)
- Ruth Gell (28 January 1881 – )
- Dickson Gell (5 January 1885 – 29 April 1921) manager of the West Australian Bank at Ravensthorpe, Western Australia. He committed suicide by pistol shot. No financial irregularities were found at the bank.

He married again in 1894, to Anne Elizabeth Webster.

- Heather Doris Gell (19 May 1896 – 23 October 1988) mime and dance teacher, Dalcroze Eurhythmics apostle.
- H(arwood) Dean Gell (22 February 1902 – 29 April 1983) engaged to Blanche, daughter of Mr. and Mrs. C. J. Downer, but married Mary Francis Haddon ( – 28 August 1944)
- Hugh Digby Gell (24 June 1904 – 1982) married Dora Margaret Mead in 1927

They had a home "Tainan" in Glenelg

His brother Charles Gell was connected with shipping and commercial business at Robe and Kingston for many years.
