= Philip Gell =

Philip Gell may refer to:

- Sir Philip Gell, 3rd Baronet (1651–1719), lead-mining magnate and Member of Parliament for Derbyshire
- Philip Eyre Gell (1723–1795), probable builder of the Via Gellia, of the Gell baronets
- Philip Gell (1775–1842), last of the mining family, High Sheriff of Derbyshire
- Philip Lyttelton Gell (1852–1926), British editor for Oxford University Press
- Philip George Houthem Gell (1914–2001), immunologist working in postwar Britain
