= Gejlarat =

Gejlarat (Persian: گچلرات) may refer to:

- Gejlarat-e Gharbi Rural District
- Gejlarat-e Sharqi Rural District
