= Heather Gell =

Australian kindergarten teacher, eurhythmics pioneer and broadcaster

Heather Gell MBE
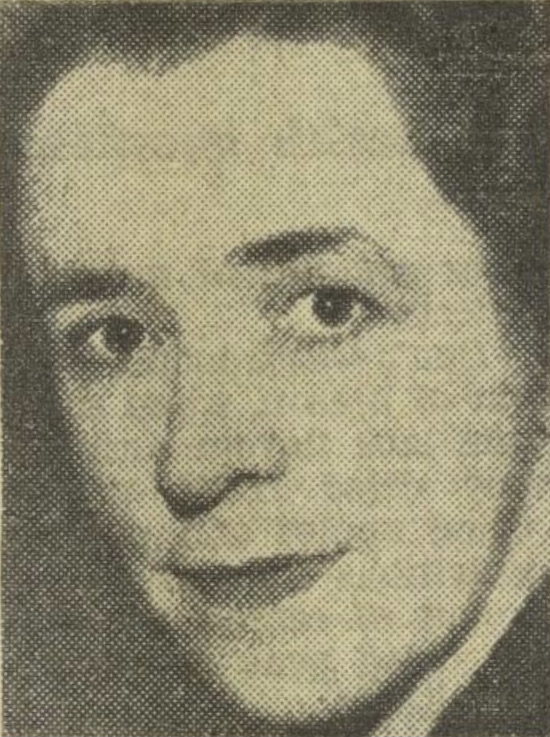
- Born: Heather Doris Gell; 19 May 1896; Glenelg, South Australia
- Died: 23 October 1988 (aged 92); Christies Beach, South Australia
- Father: Harry Dickson Gell

Heather Doris Gell MBE (19 May 1896 – 23 October 1988), pron. "Jell", was an Australian kindergarten teacher and early proponent of Dalcroze eurhythmics to Australia. She also worked as a radio broadcaster, television presenter and theatre producer.

== Early life and education ==
Gell, born in Glenelg, South Australia on 19 May 1896, was the eldest child of Annie Elizabeth (née Webster) and Adelaide accountant Harry Dickson Gell. She was educated at Tormore House School in North Adelaide. In 1915–16, she studied at the Adelaide Kindergarten Training College (AKTC) which included a course in eurhythmics.

== Career ==
Gell was principal of the Norwood Clayton Montessori School for a few years, while learning piano and teaching eurhythmics at AKTC. She studied at the London School of Dalcroze Eurhythmics (LSDE), completing a two-year certificate in 1923 and scoring the highest marks. On her return to Adelaide, she opened a studio and taught children privately as well as continuing to work with trainee teachers at AKTC. In 1930 she travelled to England to study eurhythmics in schools across the country on behalf of the State government and spend a term at the LSDE. While there, she was awarded a diploma in aural culture by the Royal Academy of Music.

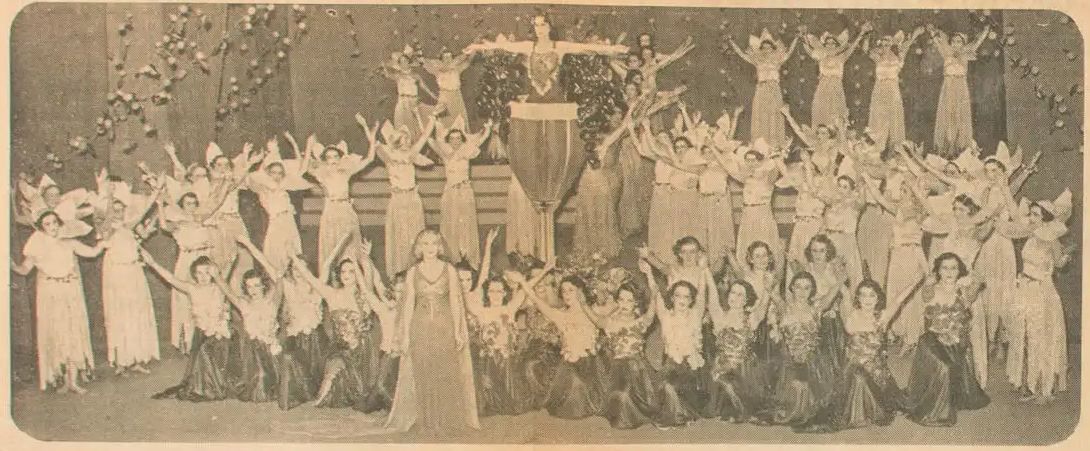
Ellinor Walker and Gell created a Pageant in 1936 in Adelaide for the Women's Centenary Council

Gell returned to England in 1937 to teach at the LSDE, develop her music knowledge and study theatre production. Back in Adelaide she continued her teaching job at the Elder Conservatorium of Music.

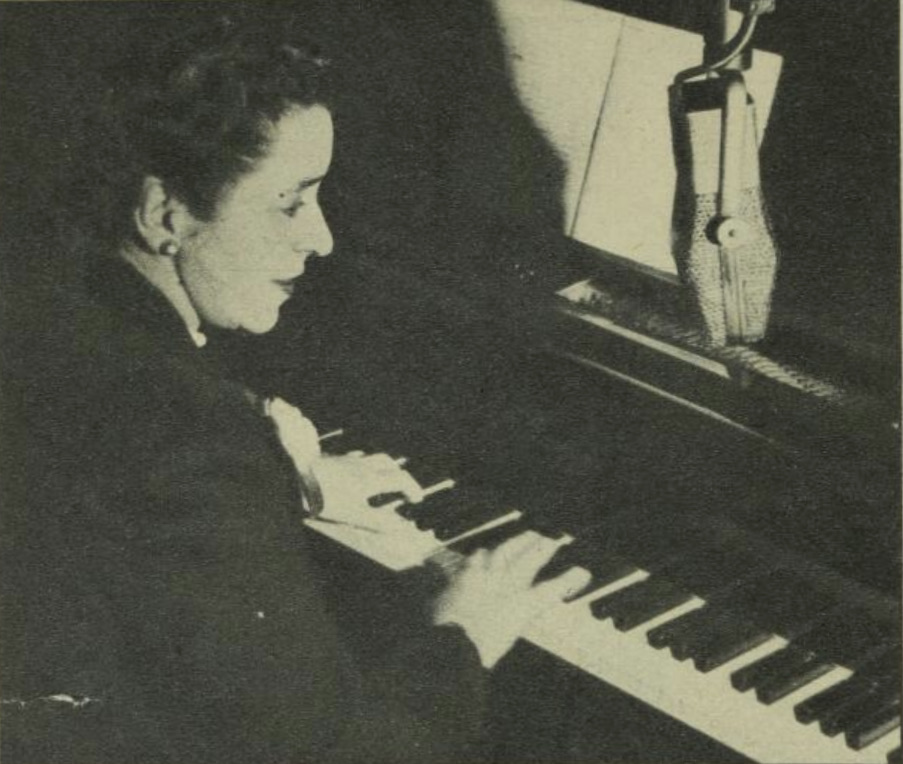
Gell broadcasting from the piano in 1941

From 1938 Gell wrote and presented the Music Through Movement program for the Australian Broadcasting Commission (ABC). Initially broadcast in South Australia, its reach was extended across Australia in early 1939 and was listened to by pupils aged five to nine in some 1,000 classrooms who gained lifelong musical appreciation. At that point, Gell moved to Sydney. A second program followed, Let's All Listen. When the ABC was preparing for the launch of Kindergarten of the Air, Gell served as an advisor, taught the first presenter and was the pianist for the program.

Gell produced The Bluebird at the Minerva Theatre in 1940 as a charity fund-raiser and re-staged in 1948. In 1947 Gell produced a stage adaptation of Water Babies at the Theatre Royal in Sydney. John Meillon and Leonard Thiele were members of the 130-strong cast of mostly children.

In 1954 Gell gained a diploma from the Eurythmics Institute in Geneva, qualifying her to train teachers in Australia and was one of 500 who attended the International Eurhythmics Congress in Geneva.

Gell wrote and presented a program for preschool children called Playroom for television station ADS-7 in Adelaide in 1960. Morna Jones, a kindergarten teacher and actress, was Gell's longtime collaborator and co-host of the program. Playroom later ran for seven years on TCN-9 in Sydney.

Gell was appointed a Member of the Order of the British Empire in the 1977 New Year Honours for "service to education in the field of music".

== Retirement and death ==
Gell returned to Adelaide in 1982 where she lived in "semi-retirement". She died on 23 October 1988 at Christies Beach, South Australia. She never married.
