= Coagulation (disambiguation) =

Coagulation is the process by which blood forms clots.

Coagulation may also refer to:

- Coagulation (water treatment), in colloid chemistry, a process in which dispersed colloidal particles agglomerate
- Coagulation (milk), the coagulation of milk into curd by rennet or acid
- Coagulation, the loss of solubility as a result of denaturation
- Blood Gulch, a multiplayer map called "Coagulation" in the video game Halo 2
- Mixing of two particles in an aerosol to form a third particle
- Clumping of dust particles in a protoplanetary disk, a possible early stage of planet formation
