= Sir John Stonhouse, 2nd Baronet =

Sir John Stonhouse, 2nd Baronet of Radley may refer to

- Sir John Stonhouse, 2nd Baronet (creation of 1628) (1601 – 14 June 1632, an English politician who sat in the House of Commons from 1628 to 1629.
- Sir John Stonhouse, 2nd Baronet (creation of 1670) (1639–1700), an English politician who sat in the House of Commons at various times between 1675 and 1690.
- Sir John Stonhouse, 3rd Baronet (c.1672-1733) an English landowner and Tory politician who sat in the English and then British House of Commons from 1701 to 1733.
