= Stenhouse =

Stenhouse may refer to:

== Places ==
=== Australia ===
- Stenhouse Bay, South Australia, a township in South Australia

=== Hong Kong ===
- Mount Stenhouse on Lamma Island, Hong Kong

=== Scotland ===
- Stenhouse, Edinburgh, a community in the City of Edinburgh

=== South Georgia and the South Sandwich Islands ===
- Stenhouse Peak, a peak on South Georgia island

== People ==
- Alex Stenhouse (1910–1992), New Zealand footballer
- Andrew G. Stenhouse (1869–1950) Scottish businessman, geologist, and astronomer
- Anthony Maitland Stenhouse (1849–1927), Scottish-born Canadian politician
- Bart Stenhouse (born 1984), Australian jazz fusion musician and teacher
- Bobby Stenhouse (1924–1990), British lawn and indoor bowls competitor
- Caroline Stenhouse (1900–1988), New Zealand ophthalmic surgeon
- Dave Stenhouse (1933-2023), American baseball player; father of Mike Stenhouse
- David Stenhouse (born 1932), British evolutionary biologist and ethologist
- Fanny Stenhouse (1829–1904), Jersey-born American pioneer and Mormon, later LDS opponent and writer; wife of T. B. H. Stenhouse
- Gavin Stenhouse (born 1986), Hong Kong-born British actor
- Jack Stenhouse (1911–1987), Australian footballer
- Harry Stenhouse (1882–?), British footballer
- Jimmy Stenhouse (1919–?), Scottish footballer
- John Stenhouse (1809–1880), Scottish chemist
- John Stenhouse Goldie-Taubman (1838–1898), Manx politician and Speaker of the House of Keys
- Joseph Stenhouse (1887–1941), Scottish-born Antarctic navigator
- Lawrence Stenhouse (1926–1982), British educational theorist
- Mike Stenhouse (born 1958), American baseball player; son of Dave Stenhouse
- Nicol Stenhouse (1806–1873), Scottish-born Australian lawyer, writer, and literary patron
- Patti Stenhouse (born 1955), Canadian swimmer
- Paul Stenhouse (1935–2019), Canadian Catholic priest and editor
- Richard Stenhouse (born 1966), British sailor and Olympics competitor
- Ricky Stenhouse Jr. (born 1987), American stock car racing driver
- T. B. H. Stenhouse (1825–1882), Scottish-born American pioneer, Mormon missionary, and later Godbeite and LDS opponent; husband of Fanny Stenhouse

== See also ==
- Stenhouse Publishers
- Stonhouse (disambiguation)
- House (disambiguation)
- Sten (disambiguation)
