= William Archer (British politician) =

English lawyer and Tory politician

Member of Parliament for Berkshire
- In office 1734–1739 Serving with Winchcomb Packer
- Preceded by: Sir John Stonhouse, 3rd Baronet; Winchcomb Packer
- Succeeded by: Peniston Powney; Winchcomb Packer

Personal details
- Born: William Eyre; 4 June 1677
- Died: 30 June 1739 (aged 62)
- Political party: Tory
- Spouse(s): Eleanor Wrottesley (m. 1706; died 1717) Susanna Newton (after 1717)
- Relations: Sir John Gell, 2nd Baronet (grandfather); Philip Eyre Gell (nephew); John Gell (nephew); Sir Philip Gell, 3rd Baronet (uncle)
- Children: 4
- Parent(s): William Eyre; Catherine Gell

William Archer (né Eyre) (4 June 1677 – 30 June 1739), of Coopersale, in Theydon Garnon, Essex, and Welford Park, Berkshire, was an English lawyer and Tory politician who sat in the House of Commons from 1734 to 1739.

== Early life ==
Archer was born William Eyre on 4 June 1677. He was the second, but first surviving, son of William Eyre of Holme Hall and Highlow Hall, Derbyshire, and Catherine Gell, daughter of politician Sir John Gell, 2nd Baronet. As his uncle Sir Philip Gell, 3rd Baronet died in 1719 without any children, the Gell family estate passed to William's brother, John Eyre, who assumed the surname Gell. After his brother's death in 1739, the lands of Hopton Hall were inherited by John's eldest son, and Archer's nephew, Philip Eyre Gell, who was High Sheriff of Derbyshire. (Note: Through his brother John Eyre-Gell, he was uncle to Admiral John Gell and Philip Eyre Gell, who inherited the Gell family fortune, and was the father of both Philip Gell, MP for Malmesbury and Penryn, and the renowned antiquarian Sir William Gell.)

== Career ==
He entered Gray's Inn in 1696 and was called to the bar in 1705. He became a bencher in 1724.

Archer was returned as Tory Member of Parliament for Berkshire at a by-election on 6 February 1734 after the death of Sir John Stonhouse, 3rd Baronet in 1733. He was returned unopposed a few months later at the 1734 British general election. He voted against the address on the Spanish Convention of 1739. Archer died in office in 1739.

== Personal life ==
Archer was extremely wealthy. In addition to his own family's wealth, in 1706, he inherited the estates of Sir John Archer at Coopersale, Essex and Welford Park, Berkshire, on condition that he marry Archer's niece, Eleanor Wrottesley, daughter of Sir Walter Wrottesley, 3rd Baronet and assume the name Archer. They married, but had no children before Eleanora died on 2 May 1717.

After his first wife's death, he married, as his second wife, Susanna Newton, the only daughter of Sir John Newton, 3rd Baronet, of Barrs Court. Through this marriage, his second son inherited further estates from Susanna's brother, Sir Michael Newton, 4th Baronet, who died childless in 1743. Together they were the parents of:

- John Archer (c. 1722–1800), who married Lady Mary Fitzwilliam, a daughter of John Fitzwilliam, 2nd Earl Fitzwilliam. Her sister was Lady Anne Fitzwilliam (the second wife of Francis Godolphin, 2nd Baron Godolphin) and her brother was William Fitzwilliam, 3rd Earl Fitzwilliam (who married Lady Anne, a daughter of the 1st Marquess of Rockingham).
- Michael Archer (c. 1727–1803), an MP for Beverley who married Anne Bagshawe, the only daughter of Samuel Bagshawe of Ford Hall and Catharine (née Caldwell) Bagshawe (a daughter of Sir John Caldwell of Castle Caldwell), in 1799; he took name of Newton in 1743 to succeed to his uncle's estates.
- Catherine Archer (c. 1728–1810), who married Philip Blundell.
- Susanna Archer (c. 1729–1804), who married Edward Harley, 4th Earl of Oxford and Earl Mortimer in 1751; at the time of her marriage, her inheritance was worth £50,000 (equivalent to £9,923,407 in 2023). She succeeded to the estates of her brother Michael in 1803.

Archer died on 30 June 1739, aged 59. His widow died 28 January 1761.

=== Descendants ===
Through his eldest son John, his only child to have issue, he was a grandfather of two: Susannah (née Archer) Houblon (who, in 1770, married the merchant Jacob Houblon of Hallingbury Place, a son of Jacob Houblon, MP, and grandson of Sir John Hynde Cotton, 3rd Baronet, MP and Treasurer of the Chamber) (Note: Archer's granddaughter, Susannah (née Archer) Houblon, took the surname Newton after the death of her husband to inherit the Newton estates from her aunt, the dowager Countess of Oxford (who died without issue in 1804). Her son, John Archer-Houblon, MP for Essex, succeeded his maternal grandfather, John Archer, in 1800, inheriting Welford Park and took the additional name of Archer by Royal Licence in 1801. He was the father of ten sons and three daughters and the grandfather of the Rev. Thomas Archer Houblon, Archdeacon of Oxford.) and Charlotte (née Archer) Piggott (wife of Gillery Pigott, a first cousin once removed of the Hon. Sir Gillery Pigott).

Parliament of Great Britain
Preceded by Sir John Stonhouse, 3rd Baronet; Winchcomb Packer	Member of Parliament for Berkshire; 1734–1739; With: Winchcomb Packer	Succeeded by Peniston Powney; Winchcomb Packer
