= John Stonhouse =

John Stonhouse may refer to:

- Sir John Stonhouse, 2nd Baronet (creation of 1628)
- Sir John Stonhouse, 5th Baronet (d. 1681), of the Stonhouse baronets of Amberden Hall
- Sir John Stonhouse, 2nd Baronet (creation of 1670) (1639-1700)
- Sir John Stonhouse, 3rd Baronet (c. 1672-1733), MP for Berkshire
- Sir John Stonhouse, 6th Baronet (d. 1740), of the Stonhouse baronets
- Sir John Stonhouse, 7th Baronet (c. 1710-c. 1767) (had succeeded in the baronetcy of 1670 in 1733), of the Stonhouse baronets
- Sir John Stonhouse, 8th Baronet (d. c. 1770), of the Stonhouse baronets
- Sir John Brooke Stonhouse, 13th Baronet (c. 1797-1848), of the Stonhouse baronets

== See also ==
- John Harrison Stonehouse (1864–1937), English bookseller and Charles Dickens scholar
- John Stonehouse (1925–1988), politician

- Stonehouse (TV series) British TV series based on the life of the above
