= Stonhouse (surname) =

Stonhouse is a surname. Notable people with the surname include:

- George Stonhouse (1603–1675), English politician
- John Stonhouse (disambiguation), multiple people

== See also ==
- Stonhouse baronets
- Stenhouse (disambiguation)
- Stonehouse (disambiguation)
