= James Stonhouse (disambiguation) =

James Stonhouse (1716–1795) was an English, physician, cleric and 11th baronet.

James Stonhouse or Stonehouse may also refer to:

- Sir James Stonhouse, 10th Baronet (c. 1719–1792), of the Stonhouse baronets
- Sir James Stonhouse, 1st Baronet (d. c. 1652), of the Stonhouse baronets
- Sir James Stonhouse, 2nd Baronet (d. c. 1654), of the Stonhouse baronets
- James Stonehouse (antiquarian) on the Williamson Tunnels
- James Stonehouse (rugby union)
