= Sir John Gell, 2nd Baronet =

English politician

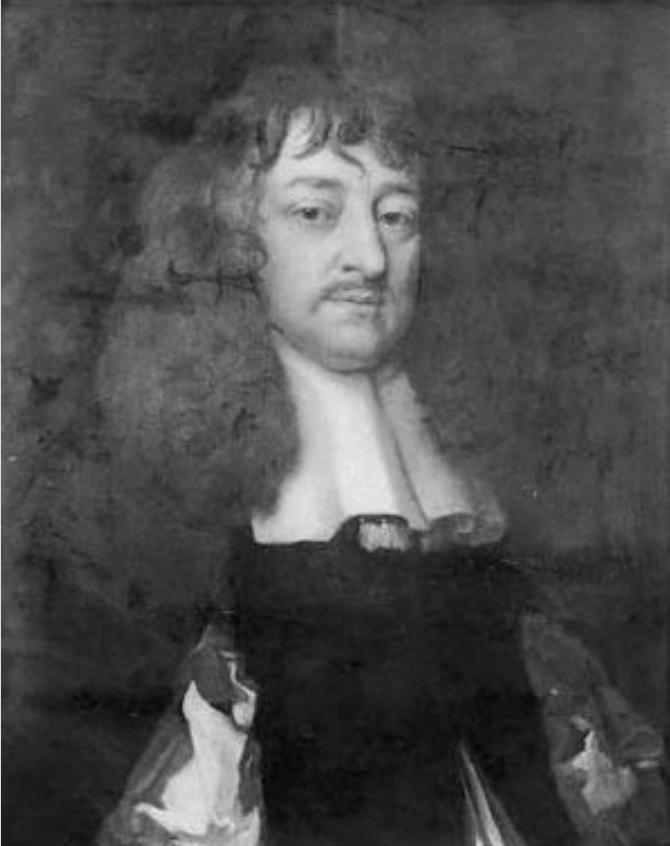
A reported portrait of Sir John Gell, 2nd Baronet.

Sir John Gell, 2nd Baronet (1613 – 8 February 1689) was an English politician who sat in the House of Commons at various times between 1654 and 1689. He was born at Hopton Hall in Hopton, Derbyshire, as part of the Gell Baronets.

== Early life ==
He was baptized at Kedleston in October 1613. Gell was the son of Sir John Gell, 1st Baronet of Hopton, Derbyshire, and his wife Elizabeth Willoughby, daughter of Sir Percival Willoughby of Wollaton Hall, Nottinghamshire.

He matriculated at Magdalen Hall, Oxford on 23 November 1632, aged 17.

== Career ==
In 1654, Gell was elected Member of Parliament for Derbyshire in the First Protectorate Parliament. He was re-elected MP for Derbyshire in 1656 for the Second Protectorate Parliament. In 1659 he was re-elected MP for Derbyshire for the Third Protectorate Parliament.

Gell inherited the baronetcy on the death of his father in 1671. He was High Sheriff of Derbyshire in 1673. In January 1689, he was elected MP for Derbyshire but died a month later at the age of 76.

== Personal life ==
Gell married the religious patron Katherine Packer, daughter of Philippa (born Mills) and John Packer of Donnington Castle, Berkshire. Together, they were the parents of four sons and three daughters of whom six survived infancy. Their first child Katherine was baptised in Westminster Abbey in 1645:

- Sir Philip Gell, 3rd Baronet (1651–1719), who married Elizabeth Fagg in 1678.
- Katherine Gell (1645- ), who married William Eyre of Holme Hall and Highlow Hall, Derbyshire.

He was succeeded in the baronetcy by his son Philip. The baronetcy became extinct upon his son's death in 1719.

=== Descendants ===
As his son Philip died without issue, his grandson, John Eyre, assumed the surname Gell to inherit the lands at Hopton after Philip's death in 1719. John Eyre Gell was the father of Admiral John Gell and Philip Eyre Gell, who eventually inherited the Gell family fortune, and was himself the father of Philip Gell, MP for Malmesbury and Penryn, and the renowned antiquarian Sir William Gell.

Another grandson, William Eyre, MP for Berkshire, assumed the surname Archer to inherit the estates of Sir John Archer. Among his four children were John Archer (who married Lady Mary Fitzwilliam, a daughter of John Fitzwilliam, 2nd Earl Fitzwilliam), Michael Archer (MP for Beverley), Catherine Archer (wife of Philip Blundell) and Susanna Archer (wife of Edward Harley, 4th Earl of Oxford and Earl Mortimer).

Parliament of England
Preceded by Gervase Bennet; Nathaniel Barton	Member of Parliament for Derbyshire; 1654–1659; With: Thomas Sanders 1654–1659; Edward Gell 1654; Sir Samuel Sleigh 1656; German Pole 1656	Succeeded by Not represented in Restored Rump
Preceded by Sir Gilbert Clarke	Member of Parliament for Derbyshire; 1689	Succeeded by Sir Philip Gell, 3rd Baronet
Honorary titles
Preceded by Sir Robert Coke	High Sheriff of Derbyshire; 1673	Succeeded by Samuel Hallowes of Norton
Baronetage of England
Preceded by John Gell	Baronet (of Hopton); 1671–1689	Succeeded by Philip Gell
