= Katherine Gell =

Religious patron in Derbyshire, UK (bap. 1624, d. 1671)

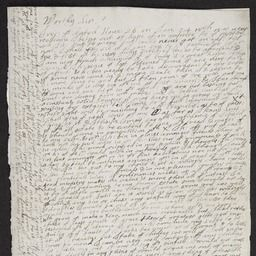
- her letter to Richard Baxter
- Born: 1624 (baptised)
- Died: 1671; Hopton, Derbyshire
- Known for: religious patron and correspondenr
- Spouse: Sir John Gell, 2nd Baronet

Katherine Gell or Catherine Gell born Katherine Packer (1624–1671) was a religious patron living in Hopton Hall in Hopton, Derbyshire

== Life ==
She was baptised in 1624 at Westminster Abbey. She was one of the eight children of Philippa (born Mills) and John Packer (1572–1649), administrator and politician. Her family were religious and her father could recite books from memory including the New Testament. He used to fund clergy to visit distant places in Britain to evangelise and read the scripture. She was well educated by her father who was a parliamentarian during the English Civil War.

She was married to the eldest son of Parliament's Derbyshire commander Sir John Gell of Hopton Hall. Her husband would, in time, become Sir John Gell, 2nd Baronet. Together, they were the parents of four sons and three daughters of whom six survived infancy. Their first child Katherine was baptised in Westminster Abbey in 1645. In the following year her father-in-law gave Hopton Hall to her and her husband. She would live at the hall until her death.

Their children included:

- Katherine Gell (1645- ), who married William Eyre of Holme Hall and Highlow Hall, Derbyshire.
- Sir Philip Gell, 3rd Baronet (1651–1719), who married Elizabeth Fagg in 1678.

In July 1655 she contacted the non-conformist Richard Baxter for spiritual advice after reading his book The Saints’ Everlasting Rest. The correspondence between them is extant and it gives an insight into her life. Gell was criticised by her family for sending letters to a lowly clergyman as they thought a woman with her rank should only send letters to a bishop.

Her husband was succeeded in the baronetcy by their son Philip.

== Death and legacy ==
She died in 1671. On the 400th anninversary of Richard Baxter's birth an exhibition of their letters was made. The letters are also the basis of a book of Baxter's letters which was in preparation.

The baronetcy became extinct upon his death in 1719.
