= Raid on Genoa =

Part of the French Revolutionary Wars

- Part of the War of the First Coalition
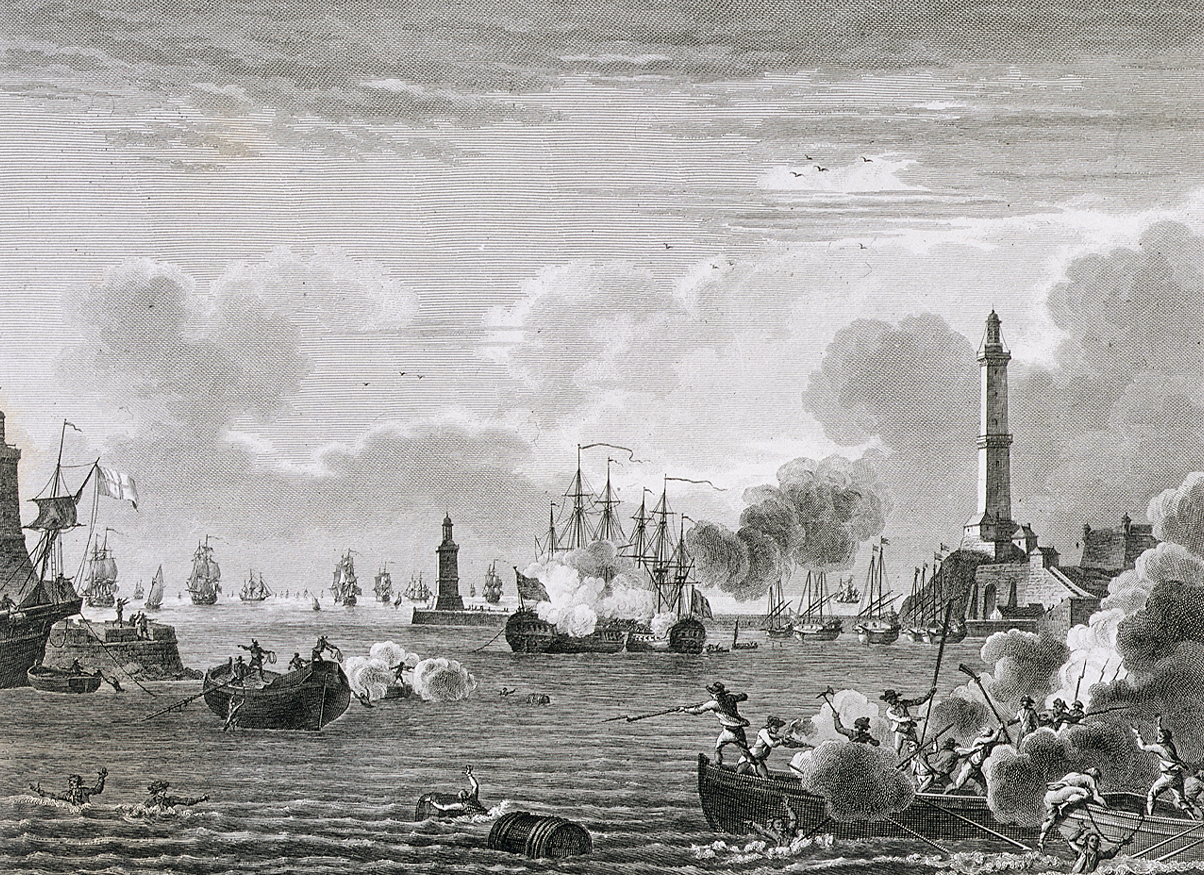
- Inaccurate propaganda engraving of the raid by Nicolas Ozanne
Date	5 October 1793
Location	Genoa, Republic of Genoa 44°24′33″N 08°55′32″E
Result	British victory

Belligerents
Great Britain	France

Commanders and leaders
John Gell	Unknown

Strength
2 ships of the line 1 brig-sloop	1 frigate 2 tartanes

Casualties and losses
None	1 killed 10 wounded 1 frigate captured 2 tartanes captured

The raid on Genoa was a minor naval engagement fought in the harbour of the Italian city of Genoa during the first year of the French Revolutionary Wars. French Republican forces in the Mediterranean, under pressure from Austrian and Spanish armies, Royalist uprisings and British blockade had suffered the loss of their principal naval base and the fleet stationed there when British forces under Lord Hood seized Toulon at the invitation of the city's Royalist faction. The survivors of the French fleet were scattered across the Mediterranean, several sheltering in neutral Italian harbours, including the frigates Modeste at Genoa and Impérieuse at Leghorn.

To eliminate the threat these isolated frigates posed, Hood ordered a squadron under Rear-Admiral John Gell to investigate the harbour at Genoa. The squadron arrived on 5 October and discovered Modeste and two smaller warships at anchor. Later in the day, three ships of the squadron launched their ship's boats and instigated a boarding action against the anchored ships, in defiance of Genoese neutrality. The French crews resisted, but the British boarding parties successfully captured all three vessels without suffering any casualties. Six days later the detached HMS Captain also seized the abandoned Impérieuse, which had fled to La Spezia. The action had strategic consequences: the Republican faction in Genoa was strong and they successfully barred Austrian reinforcements from sailing to join the Allied garrison at the developing siege of Toulon. The outnumbered defenders of the port were overwhelmed and driven into the sea by a Republican assault on 17 December.

== Mediterranean in 1793 ==
The French Revolutionary Wars, which began in 1792 as a conflict between the new French Republic and the Austrian Empire following the French Revolution, spread in 1793 to involve a number of other European nations, including Spain and Great Britain. In addition to these external threats, political tensions within France led to a series of uprisings against the Republic in the summer of 1793, particularly in the south of the country. One of the centres of Royalist activity was the city of Toulon, the major naval base and home port for the powerful French Mediterranean Fleet. On 28 August, after fighting between Republican forces and British troops for control of the heights overlooking the city, Toulon surrendered to Lord Hood, commander of the British Royal Navy's Mediterranean Fleet. Hood's forces occupied the city, seized the French fleet in harbour and called for reinforcements to defend Toulon against the inevitable Republican counterattack, receiving Spanish, Neapolitan and Sardinian contingents over the following weeks as the siege of Toulon developed.

Austrian troops were also promised, to be dispatched from the Austrian Army fighting the French in Northern Italy. These troops could only reach Toulon by sea, scheduled to embark from the city port of Genoa, capital of the Italian state of the Republic of Genoa, which at this stage of the war was officially neutral. Genoa was however, in common with other Northern Italian cities, in a state of political upheaval. The French Revolution had inspired similarly-minded revolutionaries in Italy to support Republican ideas, and there was a substantial Republican faction in the Genoese government which supported France's cause. Food supplies were regularly shipped from Genoa to the Republican armies in Southern France, and the demands of Francis Drake, Ambassador to Genoa, that this trade cease went unheeded.

The situation at Genoa was compounded by the presence of French warships in Genoese waters. Those parts of the French fleet which had not been seized at Toulon were now deprived of a home port and so had taken refuge in neutral Italian ports, relying on Italian neutrality to protect them from attack by the more numerous enemy fleets operating in the Ligurian Sea. Two of the largest such ships were the 36-gun frigate Modeste and 40-gun Impérieuse, which had taken shelter at Genoa and Leghorn, in the Grand Duchy of Tuscany, respectively. They presented both a threat to Allied shipping and an impediment to the movement of reinforcements through the Italian ports, but despite strong protests from Drake and Lord Hervey, Ambassador to Tuscany, the Republican sympathisers in Genoa and Leghorn refused to compel the French ships to leave. In July Modeste and the French corvette Badine had deliberately obstructed the frigate HMS Aigle in the neutral harbour, forcing Captain John Nicholson Inglefield to take evasive action, a calculated insult. In consequence, Hood resolved that the frigates be eliminated so that the Republicans in Genoa would be coerced into withdrawing their support.

== Raid ==
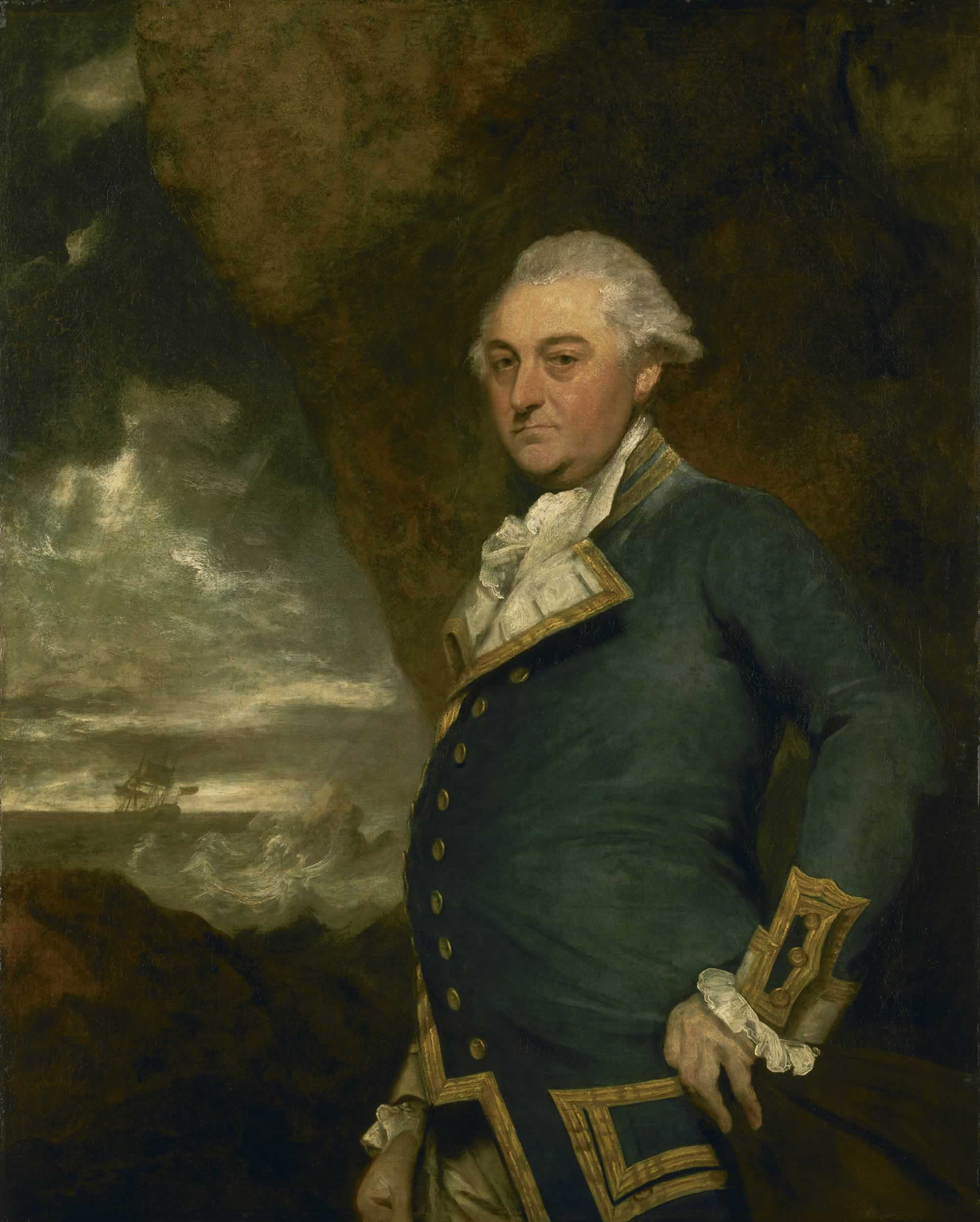
1786 portrait of Gell by Sir Joshua Reynolds

To confront the French frigates, Hood diverted a powerful squadron from his fleet at Toulon. This force was led by Rear-Admiral John Gell in the 98-gun ship of the line HMS St George and included the 74-gun HMS Bedford under Captain Robert Mann, and HMS Captain under Captain Samuel Reeve, as well as the French Royalist Scipion. Smaller warships accompanied the larger warships: HMS Mermaid, HMS Tartar, HMS Alerte, HMS Eclair, HMS Vulcan, HMS Conflagration, and HMS Speedy under Commander Charles Cunningham. This force was ordered to sail to Genoa and eliminate Modeste, Hood stipulating in his orders that the operation was a warning to Republican sympathisers, "regicides", in Genoa. The squadron arrived off the port on 5 October.

Modeste was clearly visible in the harbour, anchored at the mole near two tartanes (small Mediterranean sailing craft here armed with four guns and carrying crews of around 70 men). The senior officers of the squadron held a council to determine the best course of action, and decided that since diplomatic options had failed and the Genoese appeared to support the French, the British would resort to a military solution. On the afternoon of 5 October Bedford was slowly warped into the harbour and alongside Modeste, as Reeve launched the ship's boats from Captain and brought them close to the other side of the French frigate.

The British arrival was reportedly greeted with derision by the French sailors, until a boarding party clambered onto the frigate from Bedford's deck, to be met by resistance from the French crew. Mann then ordered his ship's marines to fire into the French sailors, killing several and driving many more over the side into the harbour. This attack broke their resolve and the French surrendered, several leaping into the sea to escape capture, only to be collected by the boats of Captain.

As Modeste was subdued, the boats of Speedy approached the tartanes. As the boat parties boarded the small French warships, the crew of one surrendered while the other resisted the British boarders. A short melee broke out on the deck of the tartane, resulting in the captain and one other French sailor wounded and the tartane firmly in British hands. The raid completed, the British squadron withdrew from Genoa with their prizes. British sources reported that one French sailor had been killed in the operation and ten wounded, while the British boarding parties had survived unscathed, while French sources claimed five killed and 30 wounded or in the most extreme accounts, as many as 50 killed.

=== La Spezia ===
Alarmed by the raid on Genoa, the authorities in Leghorn ordered Impérieuse to leave immediately. The frigate sailed north and took shelter at Fezzano, near the port of La Spezia. The French had decided that since capture was inevitable, the frigate should be destroyed, and beached the ship in order to remove guns and stores. Six days after the capture of Modeste, Captain reached La Spezia, acting on reports that Impérieuse was in the bay. Reeve discovered the French ship under the guns of the Santa Maria shore battery, and the following morning, 12 October, used his ship's boats to tow Captain alongside Impérieuse. At 08:00 boat parties from the ship of the line boarded the frigate, discovering that the remaining French crew had abandoned their disarmed ship during the night and scuttled it in shallow water. The British were able to take possession of Impérieuse without opposition from the battery. Reeve instructed his carpenters to make the frigate seaworthy again, refloating the ship and completing temporary repairs on 13 October before sailing back to Toulon with his prize.

== Aftermath ==
Modeste and Impérieuse were high-quality modern ships, and were both immediately recommissioned into the Royal Navy, Modeste with the same name and Impérieuse as HMS Unite as there was already a ship with a similar name in service. The repercussions of this operation were severe however. Gell, acting on instructions from Hood, had violated Genoese neutrality in a deliberate attempt to intimidate the pro-Republican faction in the city, but their actions were readily seized upon by French propagandists such as Nicolas Ozanne, who portrayed the raid as a massacre of unarmed sailors in print form. The Genoese government broke off diplomatic relations with Britain, permitting only French ships to enter the harbour. The British instituted a blockade, and as a result the 5,000 Austrian reinforcements destined for Toulon were unable to embark. Drake and all British inhabitants of Genoa were expelled, and Gell initiated a blockade of the city, seizing neutral merchant shipping destined for the port. Three ships were stationed at Leghorn to watch the more quiescent Tuscan government, including the Royalist Scipion. On 26 November, Scipion, which was carrying 150 prisoners taken in the raid on Genoa, caught fire, possibly the result of arson, and was destroyed, although other accounts suggest that a barrel of brandy was ignited accidentally by a candle. The blaze killed 390 of the Royalist crew, many of whom were classed as unfit for duty.

Without the Austrian reinforcements the defenders of Toulon were outnumbered and outflanked, coming under sustained attack by French troops directed by 24-year-old artillery officer Captain Napoleon Bonaparte. On 17 December, French troops seized the high ground over the city and the allies were forced into a chaotic withdrawal. As Hood's ships removed the garrison and more than 14,000 refugees from the city, boat parties led by Sir Sidney Smith attempted to destroy the French fleet and dockyards with fireships. These efforts were only partially successful: fifteen ships of the line and five frigates survived the conflagration to form the nucleus of the French Mediterranean Fleet in the war to come. By the evening of 18 December Toulon was firmly in Republican hands.

== Bibliography ==
- Chandler, David (1999) [1993]. Dictionary of the Napoleonic Wars. Ware, Hertfordshire: Wordsworth Military Library. ISBN 978-1-84022-203-6.
- Clowes, William Laird (1997) [1900]. The Royal Navy, A History from the Earliest Times to 1900. Vol. IV. London: Chatham Publishing. ISBN 1-86176-013-2.
- Gardiner, Robert, ed. (2001) [1996]. Fleet Battle and Blockade: The French Revolutionary War, 1793–1797. London: Caxton Editions. ISBN 978-1-84067-363-0.
- Grocott, Terence (2002) [1997]. Shipwrecks of the Revolutionary & Napoleonic Era. London: Caxton Editions. ISBN 1-84067-164-5.
- Ireland, Bernard (2005). The Fall of Toulon: The Last Opportunity the Defeat the French Revolution. Cassell. ISBN 0-3043-6726-5.
- James, William (2002) [1827]. The Naval History of Great Britain, Volume 1, 1793–1796. London: Conway Maritime Press. ISBN 0-85177-905-0.
- Rose, John Holland (1922). Lord Hood and the Defence of Toulon. Cambridge: Cambridge University Press. OCLC 9913896.
- Tracy, Nicholas, ed. (1998). The Naval Chronicle, Volume 1, 1793–1798. London: Chatham Publishing. ISBN 1-86176-091-4.
