= Samuel Reeve =

Vice-Admiral Samuel Reeve
- Born: c.1732
- Died: 30 June 1803 (aged 70–71); Ipswich
- Relatives: Clara Reeve (sister)
- Military career
- Allegiance: United Kingdom
- Branch: Royal Navy
- Service years: 1751–1803
- Rank: Vice-Admiral
- Commands: HMS Merlin; HMS Scorpion; HMS Nonsuch; HMS Shrewsbury; HMS Surprise; HMS Crown; HMS Captain
- Conflicts: Seven Years' War; Invasion of Martinique; American Revolutionary War; Battle of St. Lucia; Battle of Grenada; Battle of Cape Spartel; French Revolutionary Wars; Raid on Genoa; Battle of Genoa; Battle of the Hyères Islands

Vice-Admiral Samuel Reeve (c. 1732 – 5 May 1803) was an officer of the British Royal Navy who saw service in the American Revolutionary War and the French Revolutionary Wars.

Samuel Reeve was captain of HMS Surprise in 1779, seizing American privateers Monmouth, Wild Cat and Jason off the coast of Newfoundland. On 20 January 1780 Surprize captured French privateer Duguay Trouin, and in January 1781 captured Les Sept Freres.

In the French Revolutionary Wars, Reeve was captain of HMS Captain with the Mediterranean Fleet under Lord Hood. In October 1793 he was ordered, along with HMS Bedford and HMS Speedy, to attack a French frigate French frigate Modeste anchored in the harbour at Genoa. The Raid on Genoa was a success, and six days later Reeve discovered and captured the abandoned French ship Impérieuse at La Spezia.

Reeve was promoted to vice-admiral in 1799, and retired to his home near Ipswich. On 5 May 1803 Reeve was riding in a chaise near his home when the horse bolted. Reeve was flung from the chaise and was killed immediately, suffering a broken neck.
