= Society of Dilettanti =

UK club to study ancient Greek and Roman art

- Formation: c. 1734
- Purpose: Promotion of classical art and scholarship
- Headquarters: London, England
- Region served: United Kingdom
- Members: Invitation-only

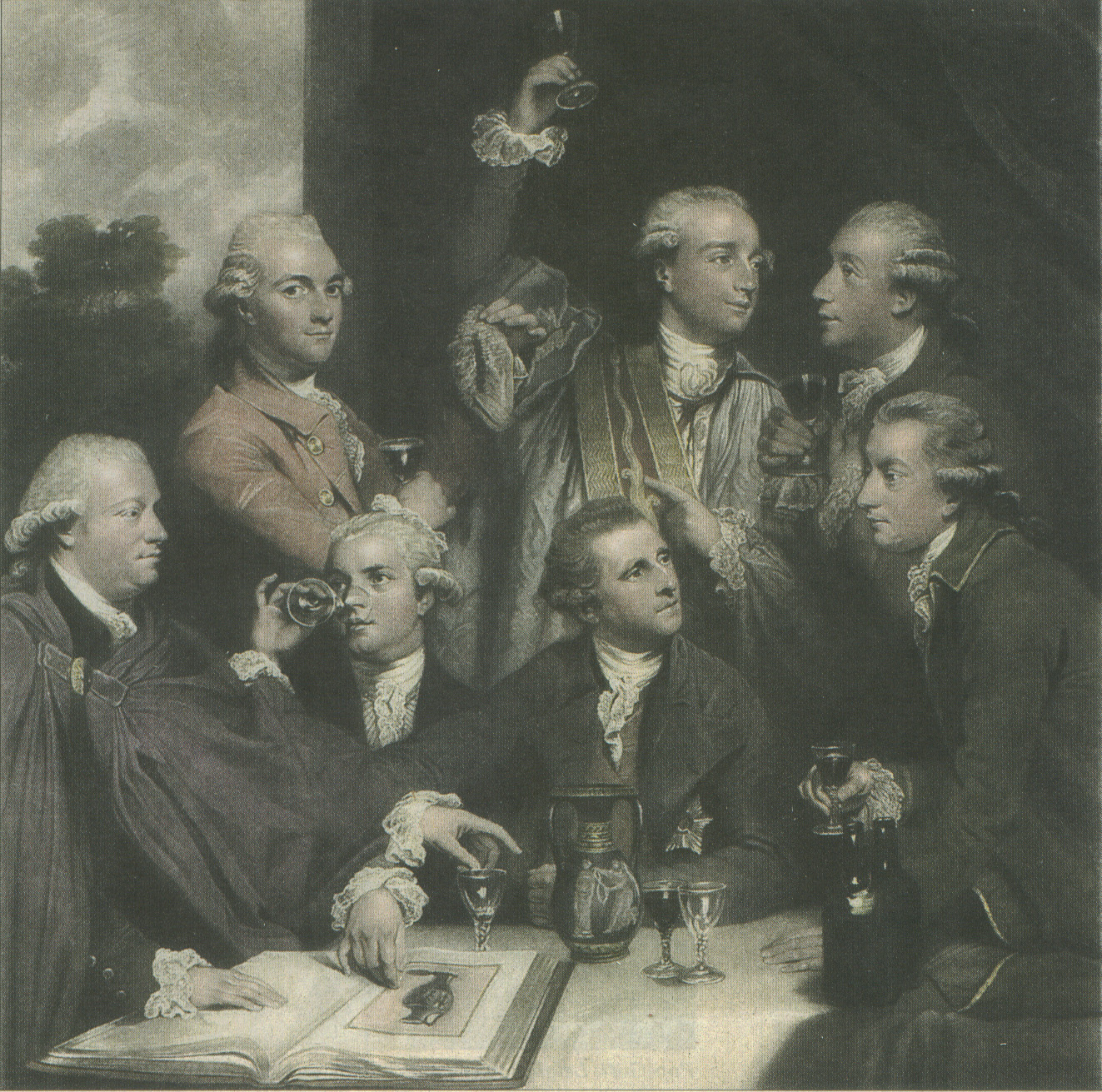
The Dilettanti Society, after Joshua Reynolds. On the left of the composition is (1) Sir Watkin Williams Wynn, (2) Mr. John Taylor, (3) Mr. Stephen Payne-Gallwey, (4) Sir William Hamilton, (5) Mr. Richard Thompson, (6) Mr. Spencer Stanhope, and (7) Mr. John Lewin Smyth of Heath

The Society of Dilettanti (founded 1734) is a British society of noblemen and scholars that sponsored the study of ancient Greek and Roman art, and the creation of new work in the style.

== History ==
Though the exact date is unknown, the Society is believed to have been established as a gentlemen's club in 1734 by a group of people who had been on the Grand Tour. Records of the earliest meeting of the society were written somewhat informally on loose pieces of paper. The first entry in the first minute book of the society is dated 5 April 1736. For a number of years it held its meetings at the Thatched House Tavern in St James's.

In 1743, Horace Walpole condemned its affectations and described it as "... a club, for which the nominal qualification is having been in Italy, and the real one, being drunk: the two chiefs are Lord Middlesex and Sir Francis Dashwood, who were seldom sober the whole time they were in Italy."

The group, initially led by Francis Dashwood, contained several dukes and was later joined by Joshua Reynolds, David Garrick, Uvedale Price, and Richard Payne Knight, among others. It was closely associated with Brooks's, one of London's most exclusive gentlemen's clubs. The society quickly became wealthy, through a system in which members made contributions to various funds to support building schemes and archaeological expeditions.

The first artist associated with the group was George Knapton.

The Society of Dilettanti aimed to correct and purify the public taste of the country; from the 1740s, it began to support Italian opera. A few years before Joshua Reynolds became a member, the group worked towards the objective of forming a public academy, and from the 1750s, it was the prime mover in establishing the Royal Academy of Arts. In 1775, the club had accumulated enough money towards a scholarship fund for the purpose of supporting a student's travel to Rome and Greece, or for archaeological expeditions such as that of Richard Chandler, William Pars, and Nicholas Revett, the results of which they published in Ionian Antiquities, a major influence on neoclassicism in Britain.

Among the publications published at the expense of the society was The bronzes of Siris (London, 1836) by Danish archaeologist Peter Oluf Bronsted.

== Membership ==
The society has 60 members, elected by secret ballot. An induction ceremony is held at Brooks's, an exclusive London gentleman's club. It makes annual donations to the British Schools in Rome and Athens, and a separate fund set up in 1984 provides financial assistance for visits to classical sites and museums.

=== Notable members ===
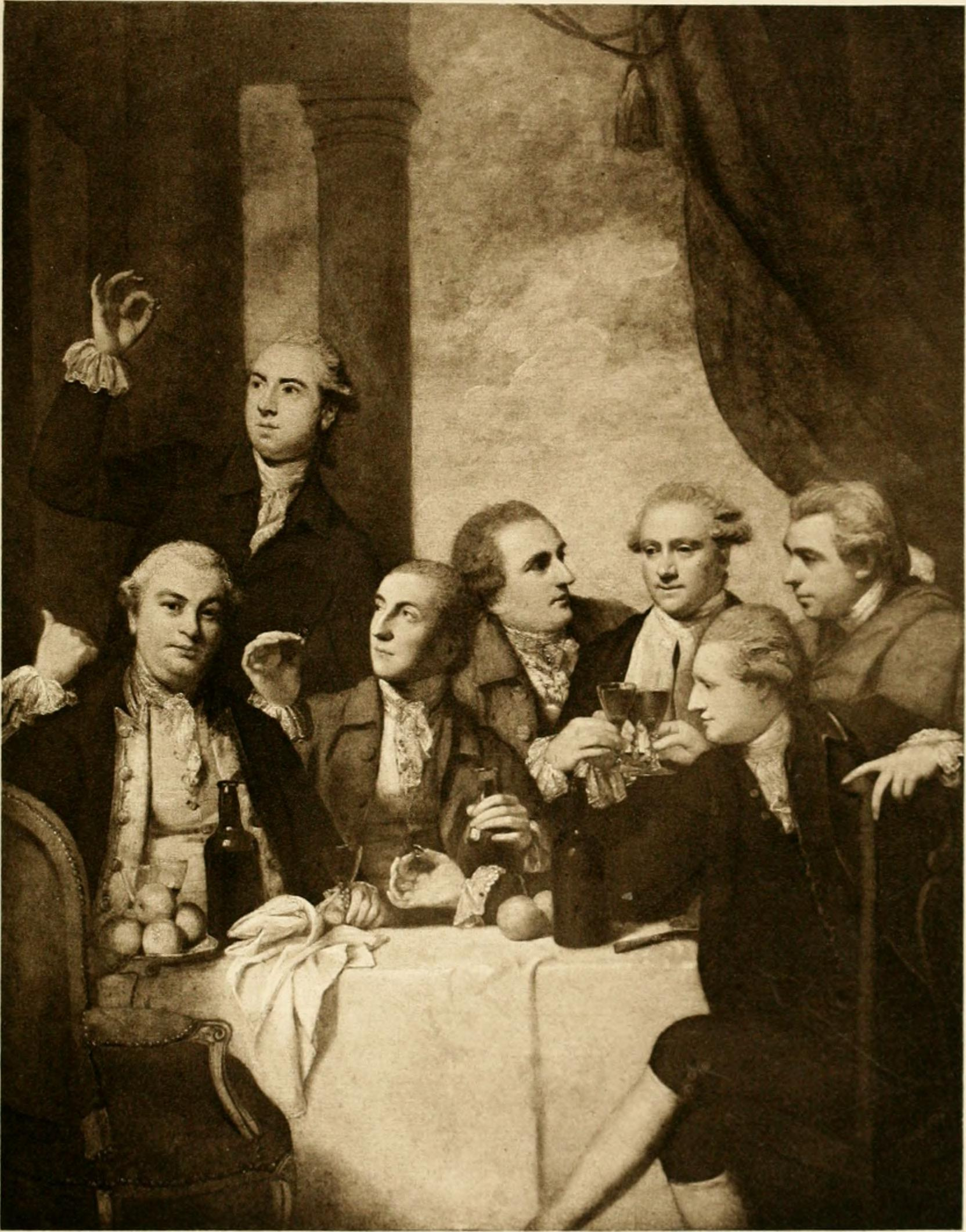
The Dilettanti Society, after Joshua Reynolds. On the left of the composition is (1) Constantine, second Lord Mulgrave; (2) Henry Dundas, afterwards Lord Dundas; (3) the Earl of Seaforth; (4) Charles Greville; (5) Mr. John Charles Crowe; (6) Mr. Banks afterwards Sir Joseph Banks; and (7) Lord Carmarthen, afterwards fifth Duke of Leeds; he has a long stick in his left hand

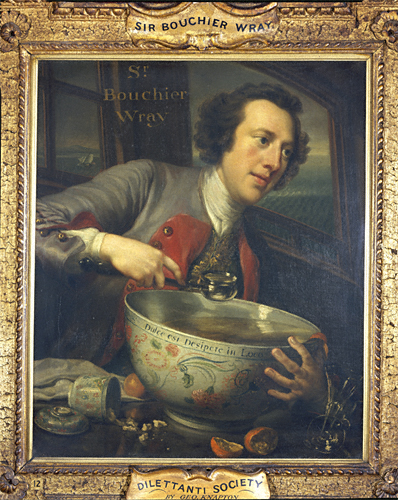
Bourchier Wray by George Knapton

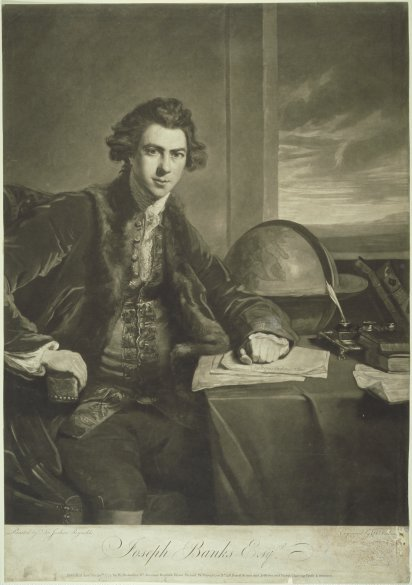
Sir Joseph Banks, painting by Sir Joshua Reynolds, the mezzotint was by William Dickinson (1746–1823).

Portrait of Philip Gell by Sir Joshua Reynolds

- James Hamilton, 8th Earl of Abercorn
- George Anson, 1st Baron Anson
- Thomas Anson (founder member)
- Thomas Archer, 1st Baron Archer
- John Ashburnham, 2nd Earl of Ashburnham
- Sir Joseph Banks
- William Barrington, 2nd Viscount Barrington
- George Beaumont
- John Russell, 4th Duke of Bedford
- William Ponsonby, 2nd Earl of Bessborough
- Henry Bilson-Legge
- William Stewart, 1st Earl of Blessington
- Norborne Berkeley, 4th Baron Botetourt
- Thomas Brand
- Gustavus Hamilton, 2nd Viscount Boyne
- Augustus Hervey, 3rd Earl of Bristol
- Henry Scott, 3rd Duke of Buccleuch
- John Hobart, 2nd Earl of Buckinghamshire
- Sir Charles Bunbury, 4th Baronet
- Thomas Pitt, 1st Baron Camelford
- Simon Luttrell, 1st Earl of Carhampton
- Robert Knight, 1st Earl of Catherlough
- James Caulfeild, 1st Earl of Charlemont
- James Hamilton, 2nd Earl of Clanbrassil
- Thomas Villiers, 1st Earl of Clarendon
- Edward Coke, Viscount Coke
- James Stopford, 1st Earl of Courtown
- William Clavering-Cowper, 2nd Earl Cowper
- Clayton Mordaunt Cracherode
- John Crewe, 1st Baron Crewe
- Charles Crowle
- John Bligh, 3rd Earl of Darnley
- Henry Dawkins of Standlynch Hall, Wiltshire
- Francis Dashwood, 11th Baron le Despencer (founder member)
- Sir Edward Dering, 6th Baronet
- William Cavendish, 4th Duke of Devonshire
- Robert Dingley
- Guy Carleton, 1st Baron Dorchester
- Charles Sackville, 2nd Duke of Dorset
- Henry Douglas, Earl of Drumlanrig
- Robert Hay Drummond
- Sir Lawrence Dundas, 1st Baronet
- Thomas Dundas, 1st Baron Dundas
- Richard Edgcumbe, 2nd Baron Edgcumbe
- Archibald Montgomerie, 11th Earl of Eglinton
- Charles Wyndham, 2nd Earl of Egremont
- Sir Henry Englefield
- George FitzRoy, Earl of Euston
- Everard Fawkener
- James Ogilvy, 6th Earl of Findlater
- Kenneth Mackenzie, Lord Fortrose
- Charles James Fox
- William Gage, 2nd Viscount Gage
- Alexander Stewart, 6th Earl of Galloway
- John Monckton, 1st Viscount Galway
- Stephen Payne-Gallwey
- David Garrick
- Philip Eyre Gell (from 1748)
- Lord George Graham
- John Manners, Marquess of Granby
- Thomas Robinson, 1st Baron Grantham
- Thomas Robinson, 2nd Baron Grantham
- Sir James Gray, 2nd Baronet (founder member)
- Sir George Gray, 3rd Baronet (founder member)
- Charles Francis Greville
- George Montagu-Dunk, 2nd Earl of Halifax
- Sir William Hamilton (diplomat)
- Simon Harcourt, 1st Earl Harcourt
- Edwin Lascelles, 1st Baron Harewood
- Francis Seymour-Conway, 1st Marquess of Hertford
- Robert Darcy, 4th Earl of Holderness
- Thomas Hope
- Robert Jocelyn, 1st Viscount Jocelyn
- Evelyn Pierrepont, 2nd Duke of Kingston-upon-Hull
- George Knapton
- Richard Payne Knight (from 1781)
- Thomas Coke, 1st Earl of Leicester (fifth creation)
- George Lee, 3rd Earl of Lichfield
- Francis Osborne, 5th Duke of Leeds
- Sir Robert Long, 6th Baronet
- Robert Montagu, 3rd Duke of Manchester
- George Montagu, 4th Duke of Manchester
- George Spencer, 4th Duke of Marlborough
- Major General Claude Martin
- George Dodington, 1st Baron Melcombe
- Welbore Ellis, 1st Baron Mendip
- Philip Metcalfe (from 1786)
- Alan Brodrick, 2nd Viscount Midleton
- George Brodrick, 3rd Viscount Midleton
- Joseph Leeson, 1st Earl of Milltown
- John Rawdon, 1st Earl of Moira
- John Montagu, Marquess of Monthermer
- George Edgcumbe, 1st Earl of Mount Edgcumbe
- Constantine Phipps, 2nd Baron Mulgrave
- Thomas Wynn, 1st Baron Newborough
- Henry Pelham-Clinton, 2nd Duke of Newcastle
- Hugh Percy, 1st Duke of Northumberland
- Hugh Percy, 2nd Duke of Northumberland
- Henry Herbert, 10th Earl of Pembroke
- Richard Pennant, 1st Baron Penrhyn
- Sir Lionel Pilkington, 5th Baronet
- Uvedale Price
- William Douglas, 4th Duke of Queensberry
- Henry Liddell, 1st Baron Ravensworth
- Sir Joshua Reynolds (from 1766)
- Charles Lennox, 3rd Duke of Richmond
- Lewis Watson, 2nd Earl of Rockingham
- Thomas Watson, 3rd Earl of Rockingham
- Charles Watson-Wentworth, 2nd Marquess of Rockingham
- George Rodney, 1st Baron Rodney
- John Ker, 3rd Duke of Roxburghe
- John Montagu, 4th Earl of Sandwich
- Kenneth Mackenzie, 1st Earl of Seaforth
- Lewis Watson, 1st Baron Sondes
- Joseph Spence
- John Spencer, 1st Earl Spencer
- Spencer Stanhope
- Anthony Morris Storer
- William Wentworth, 2nd Earl of Strafford
- James "Athenian" Stuart
- Arthur Smyth
- Sir John Taylor, 1st Baronet
- Richard Grenville-Temple, 2nd Earl Temple
- Richard Thompson
- Charles Towneley, antiquary and collector
- John FitzPatrick, 1st Earl of Upper Ossory
- Sir Anthony Wagner, Garter Principal King of Arms
- William Wilkins
- Sir Charles Hanbury Williams
- Sir William Williams, 2nd Baronet, of Clapton
- Sir Watkin Williams-Wynn, 4th Baronet
- Charles Williams-Wynn (the elder)
- Sir Charles Williams-Wynn (the younger)
- Edward Wortley Montagu (traveller)

== References and sources ==
Sources

- The Penguin Dictionary of British and Irish History, editor: Juliet Gardiner
- This article incorporates text from:The Life of Sir Joshua Reynolds, Volume 2, James Northcote, 1819
- Members of the Society of Dilettanti, 1736–1874, edited by Sir William Frazer. Chiswick Press.
