= Peniston Powney =

British landowner and Tory politician (d. 1757)

Peniston Powney (c. 1699–1757) of Ives Place, Maidenhead, Berkshire was a British landowner and Tory politician who sat in the House of Commons from 1739 to 1757.

Powney was the eldest son of John Powney, MP of Old Windsor, Berkshire and his wife Hannah Whitfield, daughter of John Whitfield of Ives Place, Maidenhead. In 1704 he succeeded to the considerable estates in Berkshire on the death of his father. He was admitted at Middle Temple in 1712 and was educated at Eton College in about 1716. He matriculated at The Queen's College, Oxford on 5 July 1716, aged 17 and was awarded MA on 15 March 1721. In 1736 he was appointed Verderer of Windsor Forest, retaining the post for the rest of his life. He married Penelope Portlock, daughter of Benjamin Portlock of Bedford, on 16 October 1742.

Powney was returned as Tory Member of Parliament for Berkshire at a by-election on 5 December 1739. He voted consistently against the Government. He was returned unopposed at the 1741 British general election and at the 1747 British general election. He spoke against the Hanoverians on 18 January 1744. He was one of the prominent Tories who agreed to support Frederick, Prince of Wales’s programme in 1747, and was he was marked by the 2nd Lord Egmont for a seat on the Admiralty board on Frederick’s accession. His son, Peniston Portlock Powney, told the younger Pitt that he considered himself to have lost 20,000 pounds by his father’s connection with the Prince owing among other things to a large loan incurred during the Prince’s residence at Cliveden, which was undischarged on Frederick’s death.

Powney was returned without a contest at the 1754 British general election. On 23 April 1755 he spoke on the Tory side in the debate on the Oxfordshire election.

Powney died on 8 March 1757 leaving a son and other issue.

Parliament of Great Britain
Preceded by William Archer; Winchcombe Howard Packer	Member of Parliament for Berkshire; 1739–1757; With: Winchcombe Howard Packer 1739-1746; Henry Pye 1746-1757	Succeeded by Arthur Vansittart; Henry Pye
