= Robert Packer (politician, died 1731) =

British politician

Robert Packer (1678–1731), of Shellingford House and Donnington Castle House in Berkshire, was a British politician who sat in the House of Commons from 1712 to 1731.

Packer was baptized on 10 February 1678, the only son of John Packer of Shellingford and his wife Elizabeth Stephens, daughter of Richard Stephens of Eastington, Gloucestershire. In 1687 he succeeded to his father's property. He married Mary Winchcombe, daughter of Sir Henry Winchcombe, 2nd Baronet, and his brother-in-law was Henry St John who married his wife's sister Frances Winchcombe. In November 1701 it is reported that Packer lost the thumb of his left hand in an accident with a gun.

Packer was well established in the county, and was appointed a deputy-lieutenant in 1703 and served as High Sheriff of Berkshire for the year 1708 to 1709. When St. John was raised to the peerage as Viscount Bolingbroke in 1712, Packer was returned unopposed Member of Parliament for Berkshire at the ensuing by-election on 23 July 1712. He was co-opted to present an address from the county to the Queen before he had technically taken his seat in the House of Commons. He voted on 18 June 1713 for the French commerce bill. At the 1713 general election he was returned unopposed and was classed as a Tory. He was returned unopposed at the 1715 general election and elected in contests in 1722 and 1727. He voted consistently against the Government.

Packer died on 4 April 1731. He had five sons, of whom one predeceased him, and one daughter. His eldest son Winchcombe Howard Packer inherited his seat in parliament and the Winchcombe inheritance which he finally gained possession of in about 1733, after an ongoing dispute with Bolingbroke.

Parliament of Great Britain
Preceded by Sir John Stonhouse, 3rd Bt. Henry St John	Member of Parliament for Berkshire; 1712–1731; With: Sir John Stonhouse, 3rd Bt.	Succeeded by Sir John Stonhouse, 3rd Bt. Winchcombe Howard Packer
