= Winchcomb Packer =

British Tory politician

Winchcombe Howard Packer (20 November 1702 – 1746), of Donnington and Shellingford, Berkshire, was a British Tory politician who sat in the House of Commons from 1731 to 1746.

Packer was the eldest son of Robert Packer of Shellingford and Donnington. He was educated at Westminster School between 1715 and 1717. In 1718 he succeeded to the Bucklebury estate of his aunt Frances, Viscountess Bolingbroke daughter of Sir Henry Winchcombe. She was the wife of Henry St John, 1st Viscount Bolingbroke who went into exile after supporting the Pretender in the 1715 Jacobite rebellion. The inheritance came under challenge from the Crown while Bolingbroke was under attainder, and from Bolingbroke himself when he was restored and returned to England in 1725. Packer succeeded his father to Shellingford in 1731.

Packer was returned unopposed as a Tory Member of Parliament for Berkshire at a by-election 5 May 1731 in succession to his father. He voted consistently against the Government. He was returned unopposed again at the 1734 British general election. In 1738 he obtained an Act of Parliament by which he was able to sell his estate at Shellingford to Sarah Churchill, Duchess of Marlborough, who had the support for the bill from her grandson, John Spencer, who eventually came into the property. Packer was returned unopposed for Berkshire again at the 1741 British general election.

Packer died unmarried on 21 August 1746.

Parliament of Great Britain
Preceded by Sir John Stonhouse, 3rd Bt. Robert Packer	Member of Parliament for Berkshire; 1731–1746; With: Sir John Stonhouse, 3rd Bt. William Archer 1734; Peniston Powney 1739	Succeeded by Peniston Powney; Henry Pye
