= Robert Dingley (FRS) =

English merchant and banker (1710–1781)

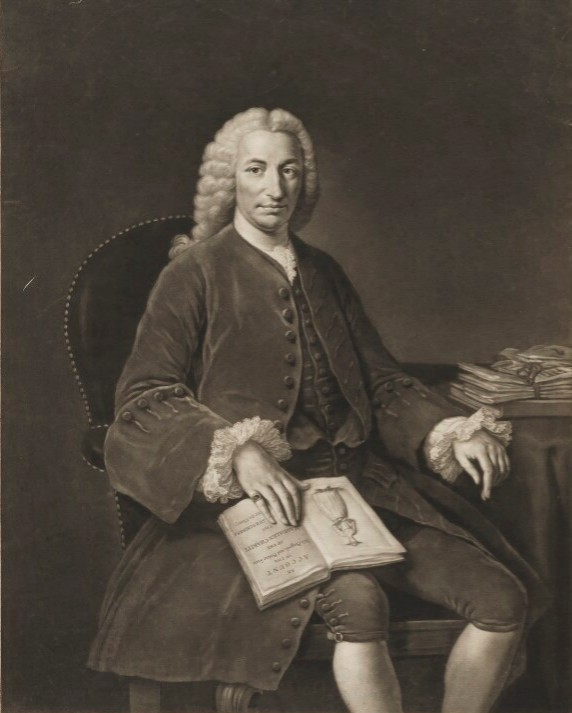
Robert Dingley, 1762 engraving

Robert Dingley (baptised 12 September 1710 – 1781) was an English merchant and banker, known as a philanthropist. He was elected a Fellow of the Royal Society (FRS) in 1747.

The son of Robert and Susanna, he and his younger brother Charles (1711-1769) were significant figures in Anglo-Russian trade in the middle of the 18th century. He joined the Society of Dilettanti in 1736.

Associated with the London Foundling Hospital as an inspector, Dingley pushed to found the Magdalen Hospital in Whitechapel that was founded in 1758. It came into being after a campaign run in the Literary Magazine 1756–8, in which Dingley was an ally of William Dodd, John Fielding and Saunders Welch, following Dingley's initial suggestion in 1750 to Jonas Hanway.

Dingley was a collector of coins, drawings and engraved gems. He was also an architect who designed ornamental buildings, in particular for West Wycombe Park.
