= Albion (1805 ship) =

History

United Kingdom
- Name: Albion
- Builder: Michael Smith, Calcutta
- Launched: 9 November 1805
- Fate: Burnt December 1807

General characteristics
- Tons burthen: 700 (bm)

Albion was a country ship launched at Calcutta in 1805. (Note: Country ships were British-owned vessels that traded only east of the Cape of Good Hope. Because they did not trade between Asia and the United Kingdom, they did not violate the British East India Company's monopoly on such trade.) A fire in December 1807, destroyed Albion at Canton. She was carrying a valuable cargo of silks and dollars.

The dollars were salvaged. The reason Albion was carrying them was that the British merchants in Canton wanted to ship them back to Calcutta on a warship, but the Chinese authorities would not permit naval vessels to come up the Pearl River past the Bogue. The merchants therefore engaged Albion to use her boats to get the silver from Canton to Whampoa Anchorage, and then herself carry the silver to Chuenpi, near the mouth of the river, just below the Bogue. At the time, commanders of naval vessels were permitted to carry bullion for merchants in return for a fee on the value of the freight that, unlike prize or head money, the commander did not have to share with his officers and crew. Captain the Honourable George Elliot, captain of HMS Modeste, demanded a 2% freight fee to carry the silver to Calcutta, a demand the committee of merchants thought exorbitant and that they refused to pay. Eventually the dispute reached the Governor-in-Council in Calcutta, who imposed a cap of 1% on the fee.
