= Andrew G. Stenhouse =

Scottish businessman, geologist and astronomer

Andrew George Stenhouse FRSE FGS (1869-1950) was a Scottish businessman, geologist and astronomer.

== Life ==
Stenhouse was born in Edinburgh, the eldest son of Andrew Stenhouse, a shipbroker and joint owner of A & G Stenhouse in Leith. His father lived at 125 High Street on the Royal Mile. He was educated at the Royal High School, Edinburgh and then joined his father's company in Leith Docks.

In 1904, Stenhouse was elected a Fellow of the Geological Society of London. In 1923, he was elected a Fellow of the Royal Society of Edinburgh. His proposers were John Horne, Ben Peach, Thomas James Jehu and Robert Campbell.

The Stenhousebreen glacier in Svalbard is named for Stenhouse, who had assisted the surveyor John Mathieson in preparing a map of Svalbard.

Stenhouse died on 12 October 1950 in Edinburgh, aged 81.
