= Philip Eyre Gell =

English landowner

Sir Joshua Reynolds's Portrait of Philip Gell, full-length, in a purple embroidered French frock suit, holding a gun, a spaniel at his feet, in a landscape (94 x 58 in. / 238.7 x 147.3 cm)

Philip Eyre Gell (1723 – 1795) was an English landowner.

Gell was the son of Isabella, co-heir to the Jessop family of Broom Hall, Sheffield, and John Eyre, and grandson of Catherine Gell of Hopton Hall. Philip's father assumed the surname Gell after inheriting the Gell family fortune in 1732, via his mother Catherine Gell, daughter of Sir John Gell, 2nd Baronet, and sister of 3rd baronet, Sir Philip Gell who had died in 1719 without a direct heir. When John Eyre died in 1739, the Hopton Hall estate, and Gell name, passed to son Philip Eyre, as eldest of seven children, which also included his brother Admiral John Gell.

The family's fortune was founded on the local lead industry, through ownership of the lead tithes in the mines of Bakewell, Hope and Tideswell. Gell is known for building the road between his lead-mining interests at Hopton and a new smelter at Cromford, naming the route Via Gellia as a nod to his family's unfounded claim of descent from the Romans. He was High Sheriff of Derbyshire in 1755. In 1777 textile entrepreneur Richard Arkwright leased a corn mill from Gell and converted it to spin cotton, using his water frame. It was the first cotton mill in the world to use a steam engine.

Gell almost certainly knew Kitty Fisher, who had a reputation as a renowned courtesan. In January 1759, his friend Thomas Bowlby wrote to him : ‘You must come to town to see Kitty Fisher, the most pretty, extravagant, wicked little whore that ever flourished. You may have seen her but she was nothing till this winter.’ By 1758 Fisher was fast becoming the biggest celebrity across the land.

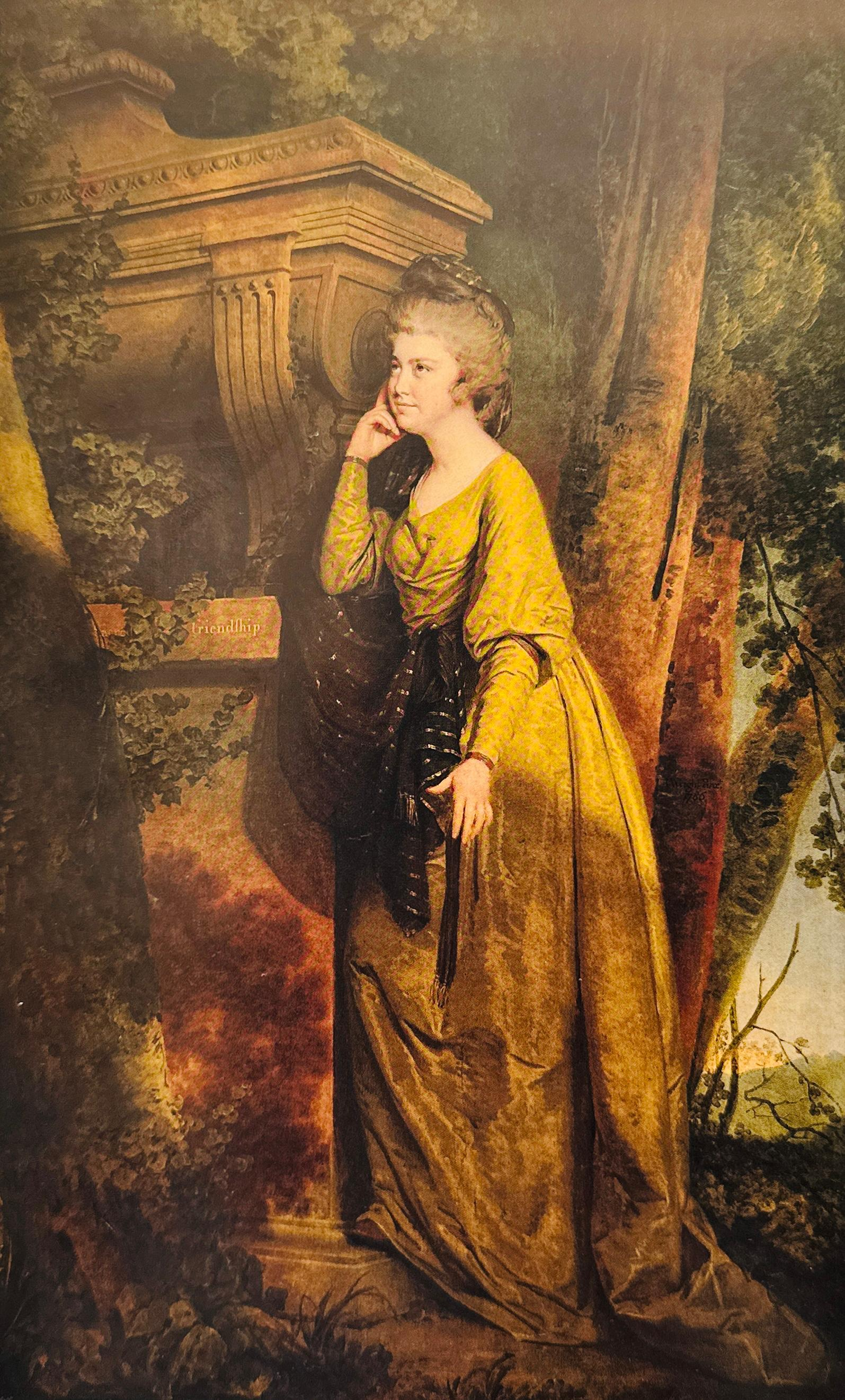
Dorothy Gell (1758-1808) by Joseph Wright of Derby

Gell was married relatively late, when aged 50, to the poet Dorothy Milnes (daughter and co-heir of William Milnes of Aldercar Park), in 1774, with her parents' consent as she was 16.

Dorothy Gell had her portrait painted by Joseph Wright of Derby and was part of ‘Wright’s set.’ Another of Wright’s sitters, Edward Becher Leacroft, dedicated a collection of poetry to Wright’s group, including Dorothy Gell.

Philip Gell was educated at Pembroke College, Cambridge, to which he was admitted in 1741. He went on the Grand Tour to Italy in 1744 and remained there until 1747, visiting Padua, Venice, Naples and Rome. In Venice he is recorded as having attended a dinner given by Lord Holderness for the Society of Dilettanti, on 12 February 1745. After his return he became a member of the Society of Dilettanti in 1748.

When Philip Eyre Gell died in 1795 he left the Hopton estate to eldest son Philip Gell MP (1775–1842). His second son was renowned antiquarian Sir William Gell. Philip was succeeded by daughter Isabella, who died in 1878, thus ending the Gell line.

An archive of documents from the Gell family of Hopton Hall is held by the Derbyshire Record Office.

== Portrait of Philip Gell by Sir Joshua Reynolds ==
Completed in about 1763, Portrait of Philip Gell by Sir Joshua Reynolds is considered to be one of his greatest works.
