= Portrait of Philip Gell =

Painting by Joshua Reynolds

- Artist: Sir Joshua Reynolds
- Year: c. 1763
- Medium: Oil on canvas
- Movement: Rococo
- Subject: Philip Eyre Gell
- Dimensions: 238.7 cm × 147.3 cm (94.0 in × 58.0 in)
- Location: Whereabouts Unknown

Portrait of Philip Gell is a full-length oil-on-canvas by Sir Joshua Reynolds. Completed in about 1763, the artwork is regarded as one of his greatest paintings.

== Background ==
Portrait of Philip Gell is a portrait of Philip Eyre Gell of Hopton (1723–1795), who was High Sheriff of Derbyshire in 1755. Gell came from a noble, wealthy and distinguished Derbyshire family that 'could with some certainty trace its origins back to the first decade of the thirteenth century.' Reynolds depicts Gell in a purple embroidered French frock suit, holding a gun, a spaniel at his feet, in a landscape.

== Painting ==
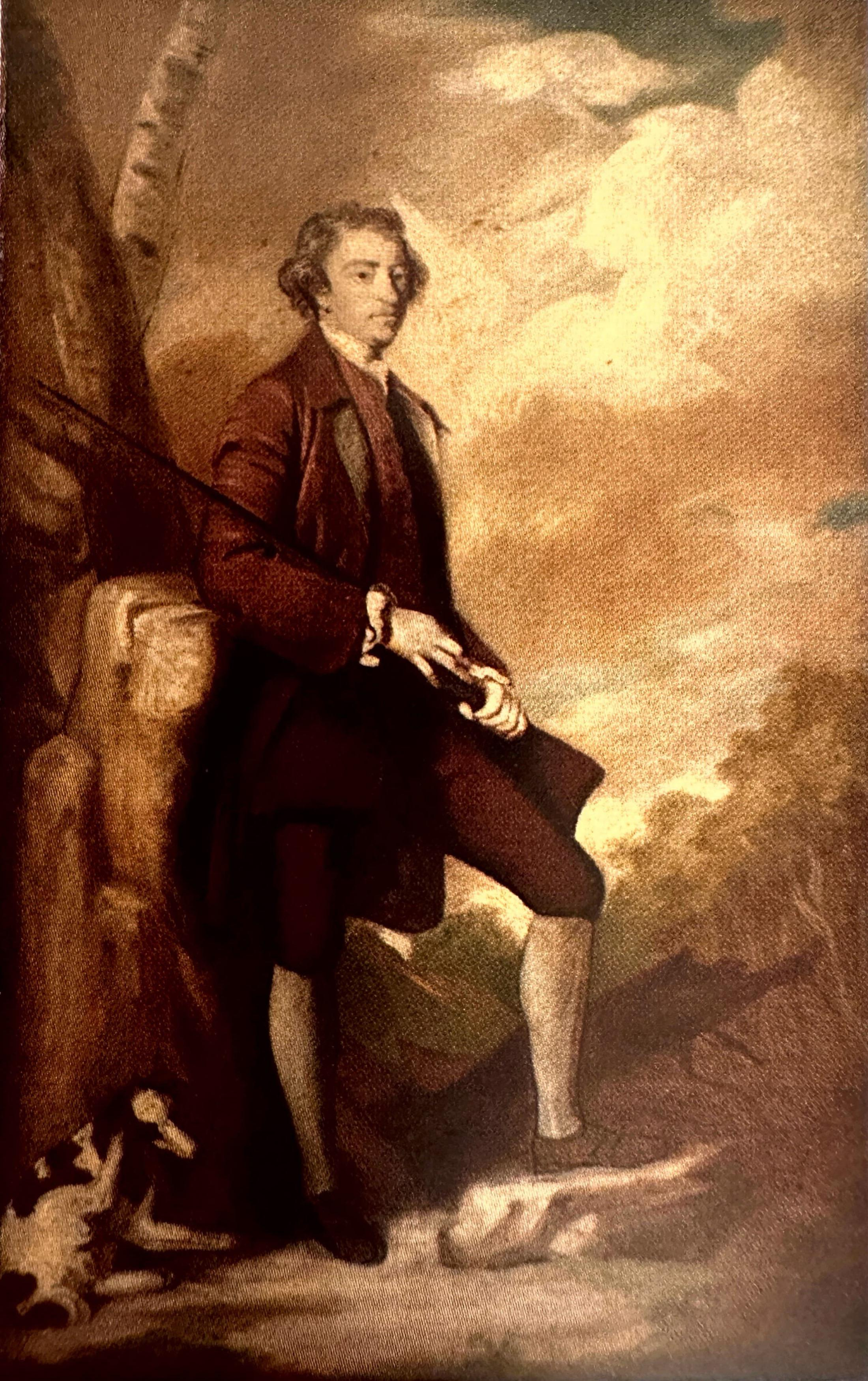
A study for the portrait, small full-length, oil on paper laid on canvas (20 3/4 x 13 3/4in./ 52.7 x 44.9 cm)

The picture broke new ground for the artist as his first notable portrait of full-length format to place a sitter in a relatively informal pose in a country setting. In this Reynolds was not only formulating an appropriate way of expressing Gell's social position as a country gentleman, as opposed to the more formal approach he had adopted for portraits of his aristocratic patrons, but also seems to have been reacting to the challenge set by the work of his contemporary and soon to be rival Thomas Gainsborough. As Nicholas Penny comments, Gainsborough perfected this genre of portrait in his full-length of William Poyntz (Althorp). Like Gell, Poyntz is shown in the country in an informal and naturalistic pose with a gun in his hand and a dog at his feet. E K Waterhouse considered Reynolds's portrait of Gell 'a deliberate answer to Gainsborough's William Poyntz', commenting that 'Reynolds was exceedingly sensitive to competition and was determined to beat every competitor at his own game-first Ramsay, then Gainsborough.' However, as David Mannings observes, 'the evidence of the pocket books suggests that Reynolds had already begun this picture before Gainsborough's was exhibited in 1762' which suggests a less linear level of influence at play. More recently Hugh Belsey argued that it was in fact Gainsborough who drew inspiration from the Gell portrait and 'it seems likely on visual evidence that Gainsborough saw Reynolds's portrait of Philip Gell painted in 1760–61. Gainsborough includes the same elements as the Gell portrait rearranging them to show his merits as a landscapist and colourist and adapting the position of the gun.'(Gainsborough owned at least sixty prints after portraits by Reynolds and was never above borrowing ideas from his rival.)

Nicholas Penny goes further in suspecting Portrait of Philip Gell may have influenced Pompeo Batoni who 'in the same period briefly took to painting British visitors shooting and riding in the Campagna.'

David Mannings writes that this type of outdoor hunting portrait, showing the subject whole-length and life size, derives from Anthony Van Dyck's Le Roi à la chasse, and its immediate precursors in Jacobean courtly painting.Oliver Millar and Karen Hearn have both argued that Van Dyck's portrait of Alergnon Percy, 10th Earl of Northumberland, 'inspired numerous later grand manner images, including Sir Joshua Reynolds's Philip Gell'. Susan Sloman suggests rather than Reynolds 'Gainsborough was the more intent upon painting in van Dyck's manner.' However, she accepts that Philip Gell was 'a more literal interpretation' of the Percy portrait.

Aileen Ribeiro points out that although Gell is posed with gun and dog, he is not dressed for hunting but instead wears a semi-formal embroidered French frock suit, white stockings and buckled shoes. This seems consistent with his reputation as a smart young man about town.

There is speculation that there is a connection between the painting of Philip Gell and the model for Reynolds' well-known child portrait titled The Strawberry Girl. William Ellis-Rees says 'another suggestion is that the sitter is a child who lived near Hopton Hall in Derbyshire, where Reynolds had once travelled to paint the incumbent, Philip Gell.'

Interestingly, the detailed attention which Reynolds gave to Gell's portrait is reflected in the existence of a small scale whole-length study for it. This was first recorded in the collection of Ernest Duveen (brother and partner of legendary art dealer Sir Joseph Duveen), by 1921, and was later owned by the Trustees of the Hardwicke Marriage settlement who sold it at Christie's on 7 July 1967. Its current whereabouts are unknown. Only a few such modelli by the artist are known, and it presumably acted as both a study for the picture and a model to show his prospective client his intentions.

The portrait's hunting and shooting theme was close to Reynolds' heart. Reynolds, together with perhaps his oldest and dearest friend, John Parker 1st Baron Boringdon, were known to relish country pursuits. The pocket books for 1770 make reference to Reynolds, on one of his late summer excursions to Devon, going hunting and shooting with Parker at his seat of Saltram, near Plymouth, and making bets as to who was the better shot.

Art historians have long considered Philip Gell to be one of Reynolds's masterpieces. The picture stands in a near perfect state of condition and was painted when the artist was at the height of his powers in his 'golden period' of the 1760s. The doyen of all Reynolds scholars, E K Waterhouse, wrote: 'It was in the 1760s that Reynolds' genius came to full flower in the diversity and geniality he was able to give to his full-length portraits' [like] the Philip Gell.'

== History ==
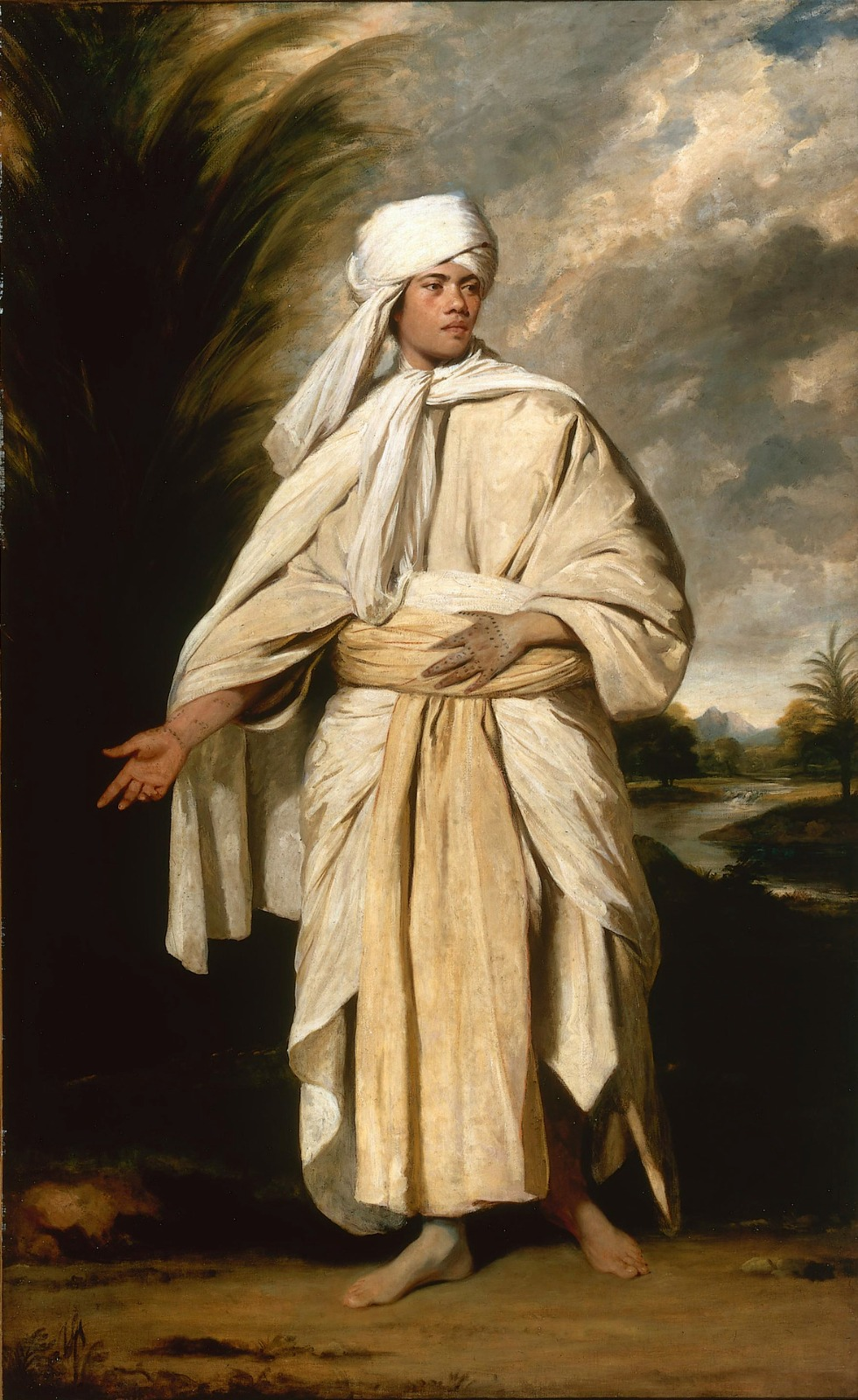
Portrait of Mai (Omai) by Sir Joshua Reynolds, oil on canvas, c.1776

Although unexhibited during Reynolds' lifetime, the picture was exhibited at the landmark Reynolds exhibition at the Royal Academy London in 1985 and in 1986 at the Grand Palais Paris.

The painting remained in the possession of descendants of the Gell family until 2007. In 2007 the portrait was offered for sale at Christie's with an estimate of $3 to $5 million (£1.5/£2.5m). At the time this was the second-highest estimate ever put on a Reynolds full-length portrait surpassed only by Portrait of Omai which had been offered at Sotheby's in 2001 with an estimate of $8 to $10 million (£6/£8m) and sold for $11 million (£9m). The Gell portrait was bought-in and sold by Christie's post-auction for an undisclosed sum (purported to be $4 million/£2m). Omai was resold in 2023 for $65 million (£50m) to the UK's National Portrait Gallery and the J Paul Getty Museum in Los Angeles.

The Gell portrait has not been seen publicly since 2007, and its current whereabouts remain unknown. It is thought to be one of the last of Reynolds' full-length masterpieces to remain in private hands. (The picture is presumed to be located within the UK, as it would almost certainly have been banned from export had an export license been applied for, as the portrait satisfies the Waverley criteria.)
