= George Stonhouse =

English politician

Sir George Stonhouse, 3rd Baronet (28 August 1603 – 31 March 1675) was an English politician who sat in the House of Commons from 1640 to 1644 and from 1660 to 1675. He supported the Royalists during the English Civil War.

Stonhouse was the son of Sir William Stonhouse, 1st Baronet of Radley and his wife Elizabeth Powell, daughter of John Powell of Wales. He succeeded to the Baronetcy on the death of his elder brother in 1632.

In 1637 he served as High Sheriff of Berkshire and was then elected in April 1640 as Member of Parliament for Abingdon for the Short Parliament. He was elected for Abingdon again in November 1640 for the Long Parliament Stonhouse stayed loyal to King Charles I, attending the parliament in Oxford, so he was disabled from the Westminster parliament in January 1644. He was fined for his loyalty to the king and paid £1460 to the sequestrators for his estate.

In 1660, Stonhouse was re-elected as MP for Abingdon. At the election in April there was a double return, but in May Stonhouse was declared elected. He held the seat until his death in 1675.

Stonhouse tried to disinherit his eldest son from the baronetcy by surrendering his father's patent of creation and having a new one granted by King Charles II in 1670 which gave succession to his second son instead. However it was later concluded that a new creation could not displace a former creation and so his eldest son was able to claim the former title while the second son acquired the new title.

Stonhouse married Margaret Lovelace, daughter of Richard Lovelace, 1st Baron Lovelace. Their eldest son George took the original baronetcy and the second son John took the second.

Parliament of England
Vacant Parliament suspended since 1629	Member of Parliament for Abingdon; 1640–1644	Succeeded by John Ball
Preceded by Henry Neville	Member of Parliament for Abingdon; 1660–1675	Succeeded by Sir John Stonhouse, Bt
Baronetage of England
Preceded by John Stonhouse	Baronet (of Radley); 1632–1675	Succeeded by George Stonhouse
New creation	Baronet (of Radley); 1670–1675	Succeeded by John Stonhouse
