= Sir James Stonhouse, 11th Baronet =

English physician and cleric

Sir James Stonhouse, 11th Baronet (1716–1795) was an English physician and Anglican cleric, known as a hospital founder and religious writer.

== Life ==
He was the eldest son of Richard and Caroline Stonhouse of Tubney near Abingdon, Berkshire, born there on 20 July 1716; his father died about 1725. In 1722 he was at Merchant Taylors' School, and then he was a pupil at Winchester College. He matriculated at St John's College, Oxford, on 15 January 1733, and graduated B.A. 1736, M.A. 1739, M.B. 1742, and M.D. January 1745. His medical teacher was Frank Nicholls; he attended the school at St Thomas's Hospital, and then went abroad, where he studied medicine at Paris, Lyons, Montpellier, and Marseilles.

On his return Stonhouse practised for a year at Coventry. In April 1743 he moved to Northampton, and practised there for 20 years. He succeeded in a matter of months in founding the county infirmary at Northampton. Stonhouse was deeply skeptical of religion, however, soon after coming to Northampton he also made close friendships with Philip Doddridge and James Hervey, leading to a religious conversion. He now considered taking orders in the Church of England. He was ordained deacon in September 1749 by the bishop of Hereford in Hereford Cathedral, and a week later priest by the bishop of Bristol in Bristol Cathedral. For several years after this he remained at Northampton and practised in medicine. In 1758 he attended Hervey in his last illness.

In May 1764, Stonhouse was appointed by Lord Radnor to the rectory of Little Cheverell, near Devizes, Wiltshire; and from December 1779 he held with it the adjoining rectory of Great Cheverell. He spent most of the year at Bristol for the sake of its waters. In 1788 he took up residence permanently at Hotwells. There he preached, without stipend, as lecturer in the church of All Saints, and subsequently for five years at St. Werburgh's. He continued until the year of his death to minister occasionally at Bath and Bristol. Stonhouse knew Hannah More and greatly influenced her thinking and development as a writer.

Stonhouse had inherited a family estate. He succeeded a cousin, Sir James Stonehouse, 10th baronet, in the baronetcy on 13 April 1792. He died at Hotwells, Bristol, on 8 December 1795, and was buried in Dowry chapel (later the church of St. Andrew the Less) with his second wife.

== Works ==
Stonhouse published an early pamphlet against Christianity, which he later repudiated. Most of his tracts were reprinted together by his son, the Rev. Timothy Stonhouse-Vigor (Bath, 1822). The volume contained:

- Friendly Advice to a Patient, 1748.
- Spiritual Instructions, 1748.
- Faithful and Unfaithful Minister contrasted, 1769.
- Considerations on some particular Sins, 1758.
- Sermon before Governors of Salisbury Infirmary, 1771.
- Admonitions against Swearing.
- Short Explanation of the Lord's Supper, 1773.
- Prayers for private Persons, 1773.
- Hints from a Minister to a Curate, 1774.
- Religious Instruction of Children recommended, 1774.
- Most important Truths of Christianity stated, 1778.
- Address to Parishioners of Great Cheverell, 1780.
- Materials for Talking familiarly with Children and others on Religion, 1795.
- Remarks on the Office for the Visitation of the Sick and on the Communion Service.

Many of these tracts went through several editions, and were included in the "Religious Tracts" of the Society for the Promotion of Christian Knowledge. Some were anonymous, including the Hints from a Minister to a Curate, i.e. the Rev. Thomas Stedman.

Stonhouse was also the author of: Universal Restitution [anon.], 1761 and 1768; Every Man's Assistant and the Sick Man's Friend, 1788 (often republished); and On the Importance of keeping a Diary. Two volumes of letters from Job Orton and from Stonhouse to the Rev. Thomas Stedman were published in 1800, and again in 1805. Stonhouse contributed extensively to the life and letters of James Hervey. Several letters on the loss of his first wife were printed in Hervey's Letters (1760).

== Family ==
Stonhouse married, in May 1742, Anne, eldest daughter of John Neale of Allesley, Member of Parliament for Coventry, and a maid of honour to Queen Caroline of Anspach. She died in her twenty-fifth year at Northampton on 1 December 1747, leaving two surviving children.

Stonhouse's second wife was Sarah, only child and heiress of Thomas Ekins of Chester-on-the-Water, near Wellingborough, Northamptonshire, and Doddridge was her guardian. They were married after her father's death in 1754, and the estate came to Stonhouse. She died of consumption at Hotwells, Bristol, on 10 December 1788, aged 55, leaving two sons and a daughter. Thomas, the only son of the first marriage, was twelfth baronet, and on his death without issue in 1810 the title passed to his half-brother's son, Sir John Brook Stonhouse (died 1848), thirteenth baronet.

Baronetage of England
Preceded by James Stonhouse	Baronet (of Radley); 1792–1795	Succeeded by Thomas Stonhouse
