= Harry Stenhouse =

English footballer

Personal information
- Full name: Henry Stenhouse
- Date of birth: 1882
- Place of birth: Blyth, England
- Position: Winger

Senior career*
Years	Team	Apps	(Gls)
1901–1902	Blyth Spartans		
1902–1903	Newcastle United	6	(0)
1904–1905	Ashington		
1905	Blyth Spartans		
Total		6	(0)
- * Club domestic league appearances and goals

Henry Stenhouse (1882–unknown) was an English footballer who played in the Football League for Newcastle United.
