= Sten (disambiguation) =

The Sten was a family of British submachine guns.

Sten may also refer to:

- Sten (name)
- Sten (book), the first book in The Sten Chronicles by Chris Bunch and Allan Cole
- Sten scores, a psychometric instrument scale
- A brand name of testosterone propionate/testosterone cypionate/prasterone, an injectable mixture of testosterone esters used as a medication
