= Sir John Stonhouse, 2nd Baronet (creation of 1628) =

English politician

Sir John Stonhouse, 2nd Baronet (1601 – 14 June 1632) was an English politician who sat in the House of Commons from 1628 to 1629.

Stonhouse was the son of Sir William Stonhouse, 1st Baronet, of Radley, Berkshire. He matriculated at Trinity College, Oxford, on 21 March 1617, aged 15, and transferred to Magdalen College, Oxford, from 1618 to 1622. He was a student of Gray's Inn in 1619. In 1628, he was elected member of parliament for Abingdon and sat until 1629 when King Charles decided to rule without parliament for eleven years. He was knighted in August 1629. He succeeded to the baronetcy on the death of his father in 1632.

Stonhouse died at the age of about 31 and was succeeded in the baronetcy by his brother George.

Parliament of England
Preceded by Sir Robert Knollys	Member of Parliament for Abingdon; 1628–1629	Parliament suspended until 1640
Baronetage of England
Preceded by William Stonhouse	Baronet (of Radley); 1632	Succeeded by George Stonhouse
