= Sir John Stonhouse, 2nd Baronet (creation of 1670) =

English politician

Sir John Stonhouse, 2nd Baronet (1639–1700) was an English politician who sat in the House of Commons at various times between 1675 and 1690.

Stonhouse was the second son of Sir George Stonhouse, 3rd Baronet and his wife Margaret Lovelace, daughter of Richard Lovelace, 1st Baron Lovelace. He subscribed at Queen's College, Oxford on 7 November 1655 and was admitted to Gray's Inn on 28 November 1656.

In 1670, Stonhouse's father tried to surrender the patent of creation of the existing baronetcy and have a new one granted by King Charles II in order to disinherit his eldest son George from the baronetcy. This gave the succession to John, his second son instead. However it was later concluded that a new creation could not displace a former creation and so on the death of his father in 1675 Stonhouse succeeded to the 1670 creation, while his brother George was able to claim the original title.

In 1675, Stonhouse was elected Member of Parliament for Abingdon in the Cavalier Parliament. He was re-elected in the two elections of 1679, in 1681 and in 1685. In the 1689 election, he was defeated by the Whig Thomas Medlycott, but the poll was voided after a riot. When the poll was held again in May, John Southby (another Whig) was elected, but Stonhouse raised an election petition to contest the result. He was eventually successful, with the Commons ruling in his favour on 8 January 1690, but the Parliament was dissolved on 27 January and so Stonhouse never took his seat.

Stonhouse died at the age of about 60.

Stonhouse married by licence issued on 10 October 1668, Martha Spencer, widow of Richard Spencer, merchant of London and daughter of Robert Brigges and his wife Sarah Moreton, daughter of Thomas Moreton, of Shiffnal, Shropshire.

Parliament of England
| Preceded by Sir George Stonhouse, 3rd Baronet | Member of Parliament for Abingdon; 1675–1689 | Succeeded by Thomas Medlycott |
| Preceded by John Southby | Member of Parliament for Abingdon; 1690 | Succeeded by Sir Simon Harcourt |
Baronetage of England
| Preceded by George Stonhouse | Baronet (of Radley); 1675-1700 | Succeeded by John Stonhouse |
