= Sir Philip Gell, 3rd Baronet =

English politician

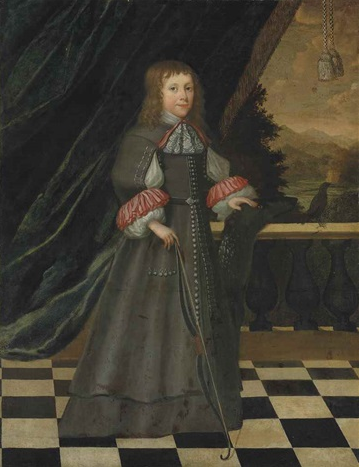
Sir Philip Gell c.1664

Sir Philip Gell, 3rd Baronet (6 July 1651 – 15 July 1719) of Hopton Hall in Hopton, Derbyshire near Wirksworth, was a lead-mining magnate and an English politician.

== Early life ==
Philip Gell was the son of Katherine Packer (daughter of John Packer of Denington Castle, Berkshire) and Sir John Gell, 2nd Baronet of Hopton, Derbyshire. The family's fortune was founded on the local lead industry, through their ownership of the lead tithes in the mines of Bakewell, Hope and Tideswell.

Gell was working as a trading agent in Smyrna in Turkey in 1674 when his elder brother died. On his journey home to England, he was captured by privateers and marched across the desert to Tripoli. He was freed by the English fleet of Sir John Narborough.

In 1678 Phillip married Elizabeth Fagge, of the wealthy Sussex Fagge family and in 1681 was elected Member of Parliament for Steyning in Sussex. He inherited the baronetcy on the death of his father in 1689, succeeding his father as MP for Derbyshire in 1689 during the Convention Parliament. However, the Gell's staunch Presbyterianism was at odds with now Anglican voters and he was ousted in 1690.

== Civil War, Hopton Hall, and later life ==
The Gell family had been left in deep financial debt when the monarchy was restored in 1660 after the English Civil War, due to expenditure supporting the Parliamentary cause. Losing important mineral rights in 1661 further added to their monetary problems. To overcome this, and continue enjoying the gentry lifestyle, the family borrowed heavily, sold off assets of land and lead mines, and controversially enclosed - took and fenced off - local common land to use as collateral for further loans, which caused ongoing conflict with their neighbours. By 1708 Phillip had succeeded in getting the estate debt free, but 2 years later defaulted on a large loan which took until 1718 to pay off, one year before his death.

Philip Gell died in 1719 without any children and the estate passed on to John Eyre, son of Sir Philip's sister Catherine (who had married William Eyre). John Eyre assumed the surname Gell and he died in 1739 and the lands of Hopton Hall were inherited by his son Philip Eyre Gell (1723-1795), who was High Sheriff of Derbyshire in 1755. Philip Eyre Gell left the Hopton estate to his son Philip Gell MP (1775-1842).

The archive of documents from the Gell family of Hopton Hall, including Phillip's meticulous financial accounts and letters from his sister Temperance, is held by the Derbyshire Record Office.

Parliament of England
Preceded by John Tufton	Member of Parliament for Steyning, Sussex; 1681	Succeeded by Sir James Morton
Preceded by Sir John Gell	Member of Parliament for Derbyshire; 1689-1690	Succeeded by Henry Gilbert
Baronetage of England
Preceded by John Gell	Baronet (of Hopton); 1689–1719	Extinct
