= Sir John Stonhouse, 3rd Baronet =

English landowner and Tory politician

Sir John Stonhouse PC
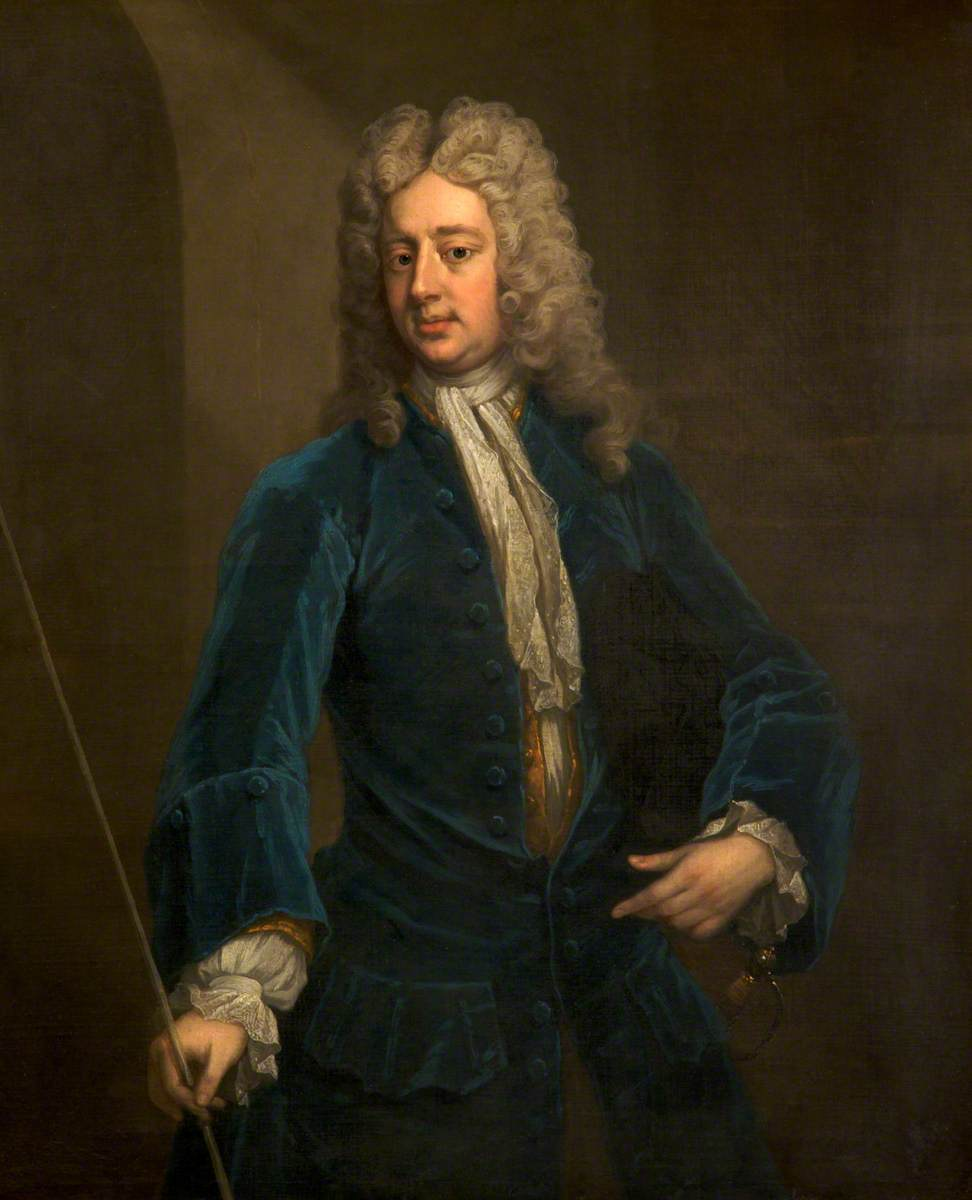
- Sir John Stonhouse, 3rd Baronet

3rd Baronet

Member of Parliament for Berkshire
- In office December 1701 – 1733
- In office 1700–1733
- Preceded by: Sir John Stonhouse, 2nd Baronet
- Succeeded by: Sir John Stonhouse, 4th Baronet

Personal details
- Born: c. 1672 Radley, Berkshire, England
- Died: 7 June 1733 (aged 60–61) England
- Party: Tory
- Occupation: Landowner, politician

Sir John Stonhouse, 3rd Baronet, PC (c.1672–1733) was an English landowner and Tory politician who sat in the English and then British House of Commons from 1701 to 1733.

== Life ==
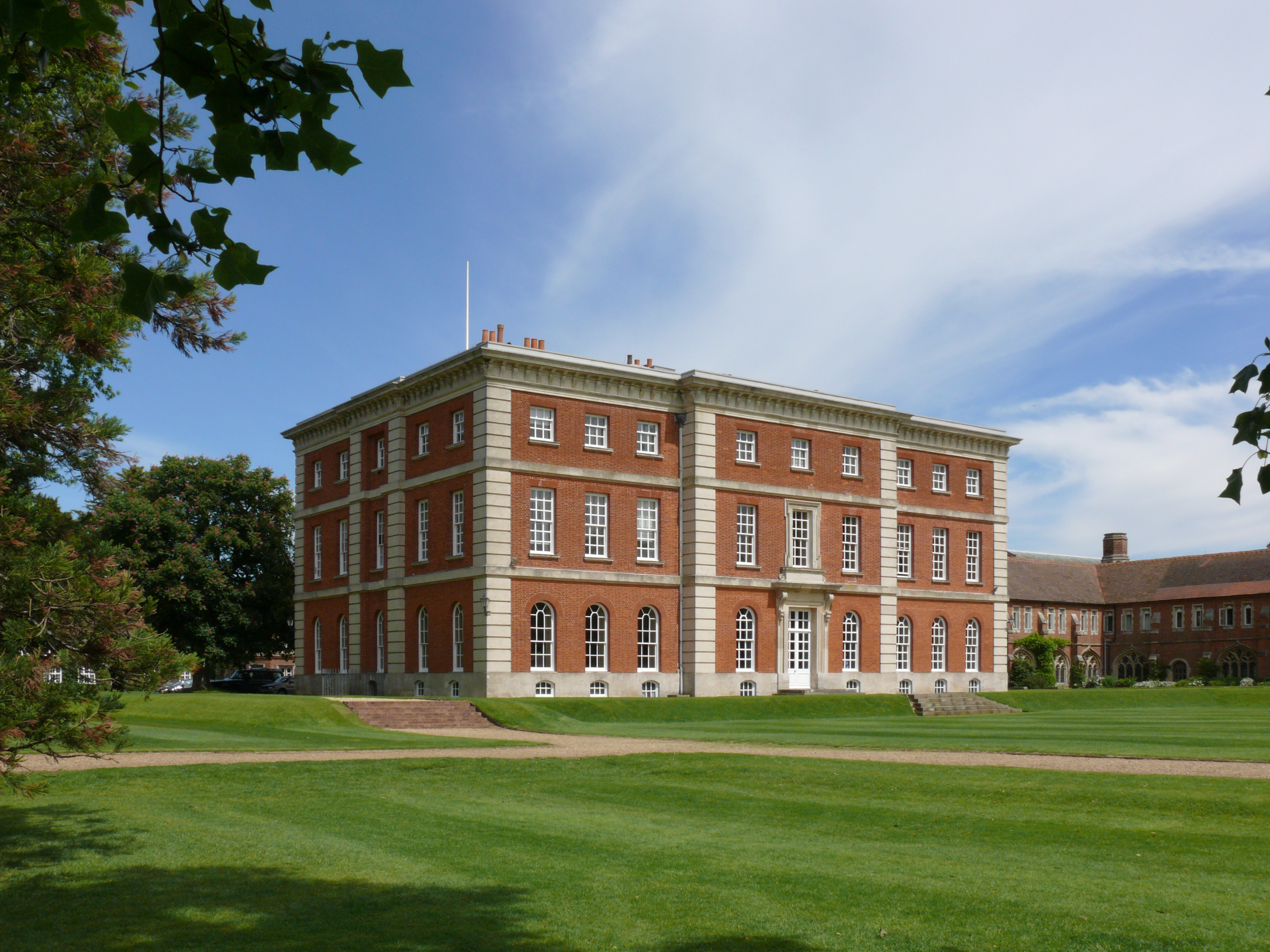
Radley Hall, now part of Radley College, built in the 1720s for Sir John Stonhouse

Stonhouse was the eldest son of Sir John Stonhouse, 2nd Baronet of Radley and his wife Martha Brigges daughter of Robert Brigges, merchant, of St Paul’s Churchyard, London, and widow of Richard Spencer, Vintner, of Berry Street, Aldgate, London. He matriculated at The Queen's College, Oxford on 12 April 1690, aged 17 and was admitted at the Inner Temple in 1690. He succeeded his father to the baronetcy in 1700.

Stonhouse was returned as Member of Parliament for Berkshire in December 1701. He held the seat for the rest of his life, as a Tory.

From 1721, Stonhouse had Radley Hall built. The work was carried out by the Oxford masons Bartholomew Peisley III and William Townesend, to 1725.

== Family ==
Stonhouse married twice. By his first wife Mary Mellish he had two daughters, of whom Martha married Arthur Vansittart of Shottesbrook, and was mother of Robert Vansittart, Henry Vansittart and Arthur Vansittart, MP for Berkshire. His second wife was Penelope, daughter of Sir Robert Dashwood, 1st Baronet. They had nine children. Of those, three sons (John, William and James) in succession held the baronetcy. One of the daughters, Penelope, married John Leveson-Gower, 1st Earl Gower, as her second husband; another, Catherine, married Robert Lee, 4th Earl of Lichfield. Anne married Sir William Bowyer, 3rd Baronet and was mother of Sir George Bowyer, 5th Baronet.

Radley Hall descended to a granddaughter of the 3rd Baronet, Penelope, Lady Rivers. She was the daughter of Penelope, by her first husband, Sir Henry Atkins, 4th Baronet of Clapham; she married George Pitt, 1st Baron Rivers. Sir James Stonhouse died unmarried in 1792, leaving the Hall to Lady Rivers. Under the terms of the will, when she died in 1795, it passed to Sir George Bowyer, 5th Baronet.

== Notes ==
Parliament of England
Preceded by Sir Humphrey Forster, 2nd Bt; Richard Neville	Member of Parliament for Berkshire; December 1701 – 1707; With: Richard Neville	Succeeded by Parliament of Great Britain
Parliament of Great Britain
Preceded by Parliament of England	Member of Parliament for Berkshire; 1707–1733; With: Richard Neville to 1710; Henry St John 1710–12; Robert Packer 1712–31; Winchcombe Howard Packer from 1731	Succeeded by William Archer; Winchcombe Howard Packer
Baronetage of England
Preceded by John Stonhouse	Baronet (of Radley); 1700-1733	Succeeded by John Stonhouse
