= HMS Modeste (1793) =

Frigate of the Royal Navy

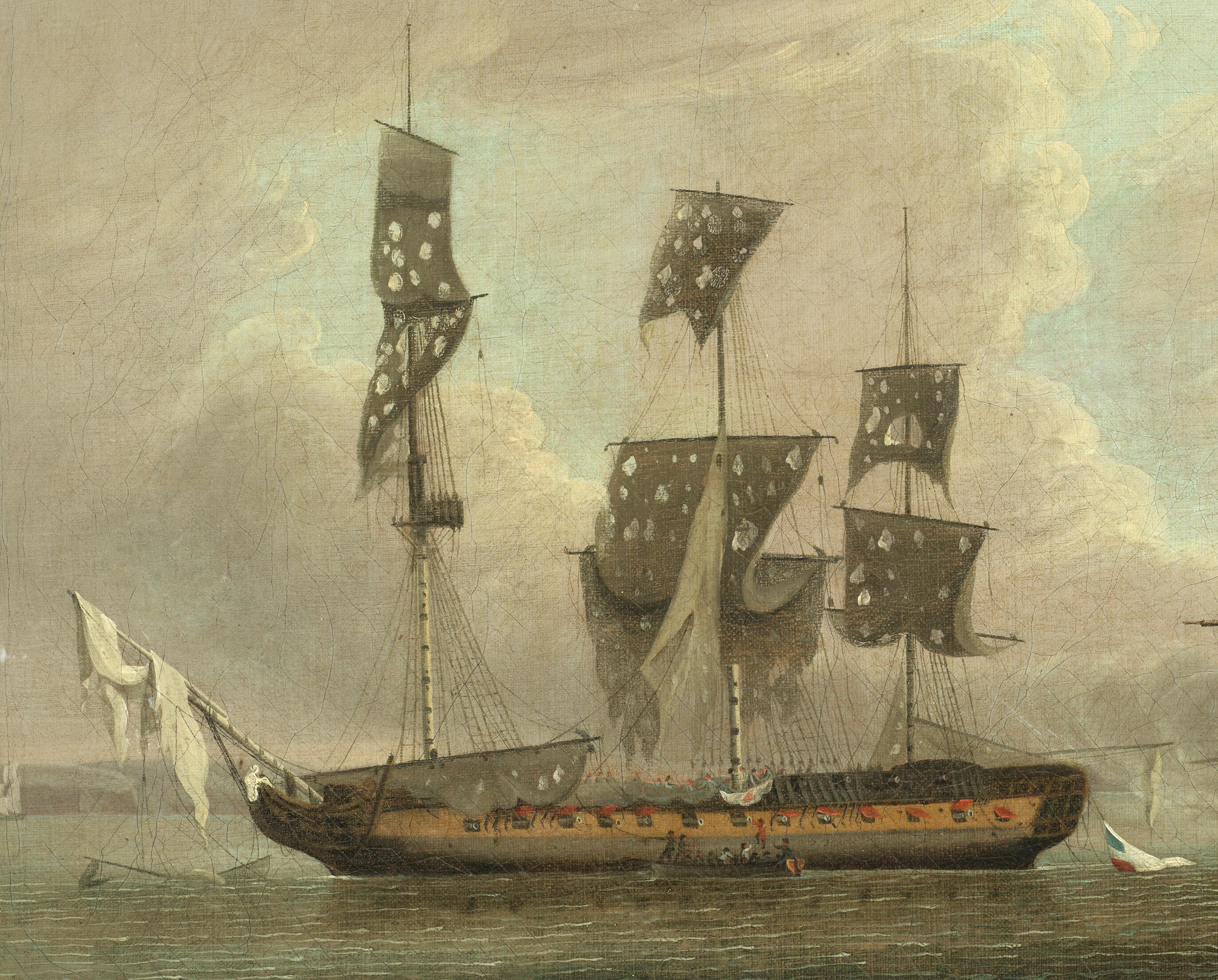
- Réunion, Modeste's sister ship

History

France
- Name: Modeste
- Builder: Toulon
- Laid down: February 1785
- Launched: 18 March 1786
- Completed: January 1787
- Captured: By the Royal Navy on 17 October 1793

Great Britain
- Name: HMS Modeste
- Acquired: 17 October 1793
- Honours and awards: Naval General Service Medal with clasp "Egypt"
- Fate: Broken up in June 1814

General characteristics
- Class & type: 36-gun Magicienne-class frigate
- Displacement: 1,100 tonneaux
- Tons burthen: 600 port tonneaux; 940 35/94 (bm)
- Length: 143 ft 8 in (43.8 m) (overall); 118 ft 3 in (36.0 m) (keel)
- Beam: 38 ft 8 in (11.8 m)
- Depth of hold: 12 ft 1 1/2 in (3.70 m)
- Propulsion: Sails
- Sail plan: Full-rigged ship
- Complement: 270
- Armament: French service; Upper deck: 26 × 12-pounder guns; Spar deck: 6 × 6-pounder guns; British service; Upper deck: 26 × 18-pounder guns; QD: 14 × 32-pounder carronades; Fc: 2 × 9-pounder guns + 2 × 32-pounder carronades

HMS Modeste was a 36-gun fifth rate frigate of the Royal Navy. She had previously been a ship of the French Navy under the name Modeste. Launched in France in 1786, she served during the first actions of the French Revolutionary Wars until being captured while in harbour at Genoa, in circumstances disputed by the French and British, and which created a diplomatic incident. Taken into British service she spent the rest of the French Revolutionary and most of the Napoleonic Wars under the White Ensign. She served with distinction in the East Indies, capturing several privateers and enemy vessels, including the French corvette Iéna. She also saw service in a variety of roles, as a troopship, a receiving ship, and a floating battery, until finally being broken up in 1814, as the Napoleonic Wars drew to a close.

== French service and capture ==
Modeste was a Magicienne-class frigate built at Toulon between February 1785 and January 1787, having been launched there on 18 March 1786. In September 1793 she entered the neutral port of Genoa, where according to British reports, her captain was seized by the French Republican agent in the port, who suspected the frigate as having come from the Royalist-held Toulon on some secret mission. The British had been dissatisfied with the actions of the neutral Genoa, in allowing the Modeste and two French tartanes to 'insult' and 'molest' the frigate Aigle while she was also in Genoa. Furthermore the French were alleged to have seized a ship travelling under an assurance of safe passage from Lord Hood. The British envoy in Genoa, Francis Drake, was instructed to seek reparations from the Genoese, and to put a stop to the shipment of grain to the French Republicans.

Drake was unsuccessful, so Hood sent Rear-Admiral John Gell to Genoa with orders to capture Modeste, the two tartanes and any other French ships. Drake was to secure assurances from the Genoese that they would comply with Hood's wishes, or failing that, Gell was to blockade the port. Gell was also to travel to Leghorn and capture the French frigate Impérieuse, and instruct the British envoy to the Grand Duchy of Tuscany, Lord Hervey, to demand the expulsion of the French Jacobins. To back up these demands Gell had a squadron consisting of HMS St George, the 74-gun ships HMS Bedford, HMS Captain and the French Scipion, and the smaller vessels HMS Mermaid, HMS Tartar, HMS Alerte, HMS Speedy, HMS Eclair, HMS Conflagration, and HMS Vulcan.

The squadron entered Genoa on 17 October and Bedford ranged alongside Modeste. Accounts then differ as to what happened next. A later French account stated that the British ship had moored alongside, and her master had civilly requested the French ship remove a boat that was hampering the British manoeuvres. The French readily agreed, but half an hour later the British captain asked the French to hoist the white flag, saying that he did not know what the tricolour was. Offended, the French refused, whereupon the British suddenly attacked the unprepared French, and captured the frigate. One British account states that Bedford came alongside and after warning the French not to resist, captured her after a short struggle, while another stated that while the fort was saluting the arrival of Rear-Admiral Gell, the French on Modeste came up on deck and behaved with such insolent gestures and language that the British attacked them. The British reported that two Frenchmen had been killed during the fighting on the tartanes, while French sources alternately reported five dead, thirty wounded, or between 30 and 40 killed. The attack outraged the Genoese, who were being threatened both by Drake and by representatives of the French republic, and created a diplomatic incident. The Genoes finally bowed to French pressure and ordered the expulsion of all foreigners, with the exception of the French. The Genoese broke all diplomatic ties; in response Gell's squadron began to blockade Genoa, capturing neutral merchants bound for the city.

== British career ==
Modeste was taken into service with the Royal Navy, retaining her original name, and was commissioned in November 1793 under Captain Thomas Byam Martin. After some service in the Mediterranean Martin sailed her back to Britain, arriving in Portsmouth on 4 December 1794. Modeste was then laid up, until being converted to a receiving ship in 1798, and was then fitted out between August and October 1799 to sail to the Thames. On arriving at Deptford in November she was fitted out as a troopship, a process that lasted until June 1800. She was commissioned in June that year under Commander Martin Hinton as a 24-gun troopship.

She spent some time in the Mediterranean under Hinton in 1801. Because Modeste served in the navy's Egyptian campaign (8 March to 8 September 1801), her officers and crew qualified for the clasp "Egypt" to the Naval General Service Medal that the Admiralty authorised in 1850 for all surviving claimants. (Note: A first-class share of the prize money awarded in April 1823 was worth £34 2s 4d; a fifth-class share, that of a seaman, was worth 3s 11½d. The amount was small as the total had to be shared between 79 vessels and the entire army contingent.)

Soon she was back in Britain, being fitted out at Woolwich between September and October 1803 for service with Trinity House. The Navy next used her as a floating battery in 1804.

Modeste then underwent a middling repair at Woolwich between April and November 1806 and was recommissioned in October that year under Captain the Honourable George Elliot. Elliot departed Britain on 15 February 1807, bound for China and the East Indies.

On 30 July Modeste arrived at Diamond Harbour, carrying Lord Minto who was coming to Calcutta to assume the position of Governor-General of India.

Modeste was in the Pearl River, China, in late 1807. Albion was carrying dollars to British merchants at Canton from Canton to Chuenpi when she caught fire and sank. The dollars were salvaged. The reason Albion was carrying them was that the British merchants in Canton wanted to ship them back to Calcutta on a warship, but the Chinese authorities would not permit naval vessels to come up the Pearl River past the Bogue. The merchants therefore engaged Albion to use her boats to get the silver from Canton to Whampoa Anchorage, and then herself carry the silver to Chuenpi, near the mouth of the river, just below the Bogue. At the time, commanders of naval vessels were permitted to carry bullion for merchants in return for a fee on the vale of the freight that, unlike prize or head money, the commander did not have to share with his officers and crew. Captain Elliot demanded a 2% freight fee to carry the silver to Calcutta, a demand the committee of merchants thought exorbitant and that they refused to pay. Eventually the dispute reached the Governor-in Council in Calcutta, who imposed a cap of 1% on the fee.

On 28 January 1808 Modeste was back at Calcutta. News had been received of the outbreak of war between Great Britain and Denmark. Elliot sent his boats, together with those of Terpsichore and Dasher, up the Hooghly River to Serampore to seize the Danish merchant vessels there. One of the captured vessels was Maria, which in November 1808 a prize court awarded to Modeste.

On 8 October 1808 Modeste chased down and captured the 18-gun French corvette Iéna while in the Bay of Bengal. Iéna, under the command of Captain Maurice, was bound for the Persian Gulf with despatches, and had captured several ships. She had captured Jennet, of Madras, which she had sunk, and Swallow, of Penang. When Modeste captured Iena she was carrying 25,000 dollars she had taken from Swallow, and had also captured an Arab vessel named Frederick, which Elliot retook. (Note: The builders Aberdeen & Hamilton had built Frederick, of 450 tons (bm), in 1803 at Tittaghur in 1803. She had then been sold to Arabs.) Iéna had mistaken Modeste for another merchant vessel and had tried to close on her. On discovering her mistake she had tried to escape, but had been caught after a nine-hour chase and an exchange of fire that left four or five Frenchmen dead or wounded, and one man killed and one wounded on Modeste. Swallow had been in company with Iena, but escaped.

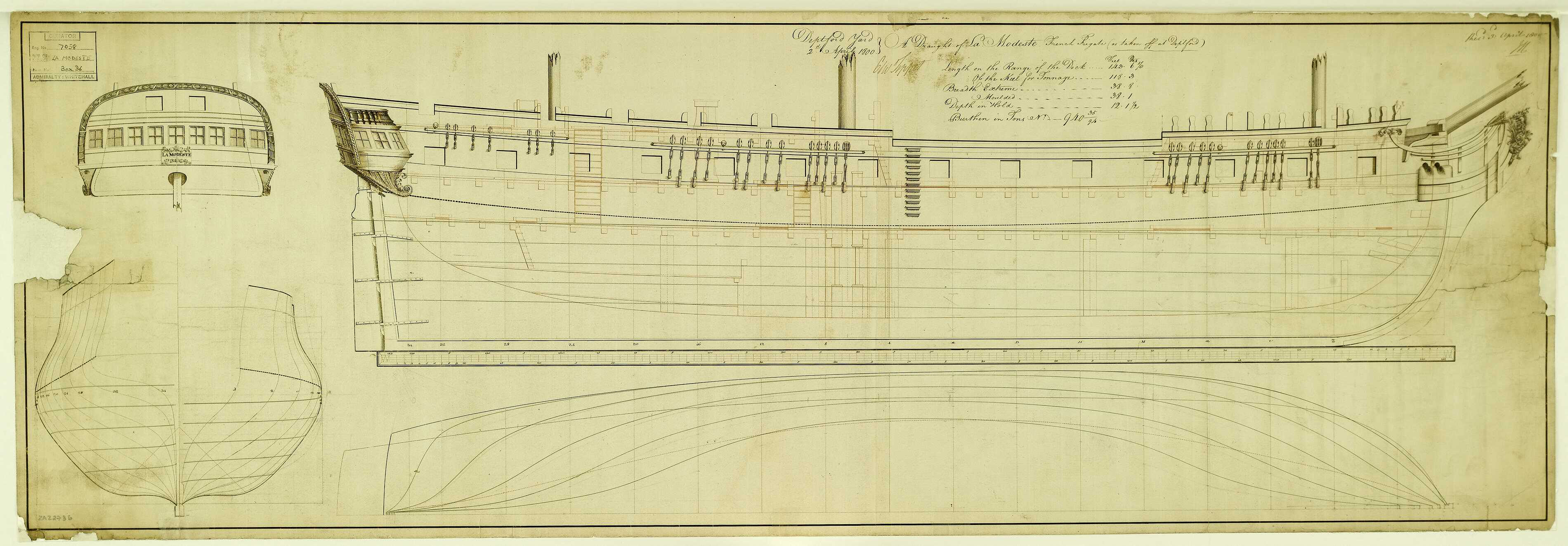
Plan for Modeste

Modeste sailed on to Macao, arriving in November. Her arrival helped induce the Chinese government at Canton to bring to an end an affair that had begun with a fracas between local Chinese and seamen from the East Indiaman Neptune in March. Modeste also detained a brig under Portuguese colours as the brig sailed out of the Typa, Macao's outer harbour. Elliot had information that the brig was actually Spanish. It was not yet settled whether the seizure of the brig would be adjudicated in China or at Bombay.

On 15 July 1809 boats from Modeste and HMS Barracouta cut out the 8-gun Tuijneelar in the Sunda Straits. Elliot then took part in the operations to capture Java between August and September 1811. Elliot left Modeste in 1812, and was succeeded by Captain James Crawford, who on 6 February 1813 captured the 14-gun privateer Furet off Sicily.

== Fate ==
Modeste was finally placed in ordinary at Woolwich in 1813. After a year in ordinary, she was broken up at Deptford in June 1814.
