= John Gell (Royal Navy officer) =

Royal Navy officer (1740–1806)

Admiral John Gell
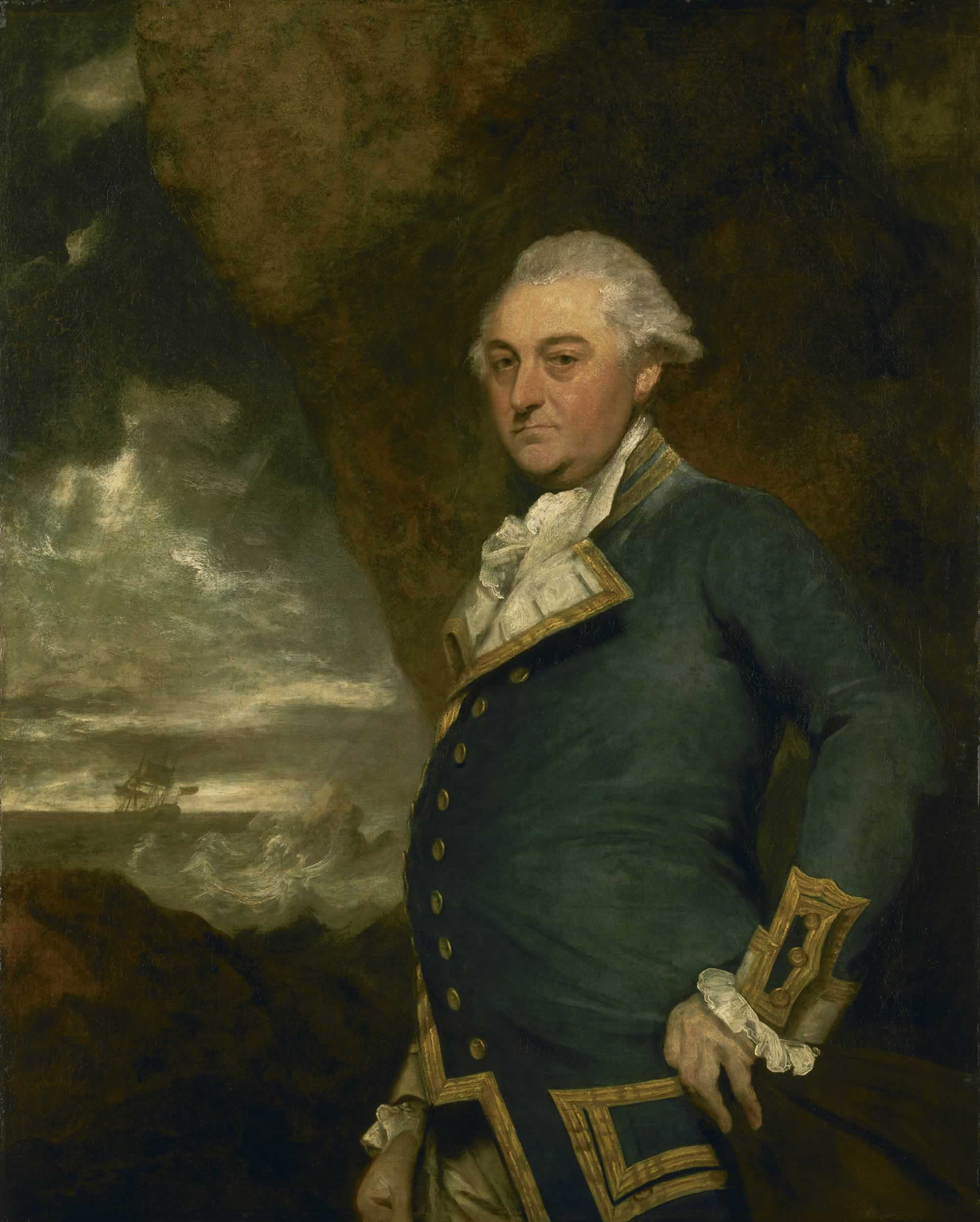
- Portrait by Sir Joshua Reynolds, 1786
- Born: c.1740 Hopton, Derbyshire
- Died: 1806 (aged 65–66); Llangattock, Powys
- Relatives: Philip Eyre Gell (brother); Sir William Gell (nephew)
- Military career
- Allegiance: Great Britain; United Kingdom
- Branch: Royal Navy
- Service years: c. 1757–1806
- Rank: Admiral
- Commands: HMS Grampus; HMS Guernsey; HMS Launceston; HMS Thetis; HMS Monarca; HMS Excellent
- Conflicts: Seven Years' War; American War of Independence; Battle of Sadras; Battle of Providien; Battle of Negapatam (1782); Battle of Trincomalee; Battle of Cuddalore (1783); French Revolutionary Wars; Siege of Toulon; Raid on Genoa

Admiral John Gell (c.1740 – 1806) was a Royal Navy officer who served in the Seven Years' War, American War of Independence and French Revolutionary Wars. Born in Hopton Hall in Hopton, Derbyshire, he joined the British navy in c. 1757 and gradually rose through the ranks. Gell was promoted to the rank of admiral in 1799 after a long career in Europe, the Americas and India. In 1793, Gell captured a Spanish ship which contained two million dollars and packages valued at over 200,000 pounds, which proved to be one of the richest prizes ever brought to England. He died in 1806.

== Early life ==
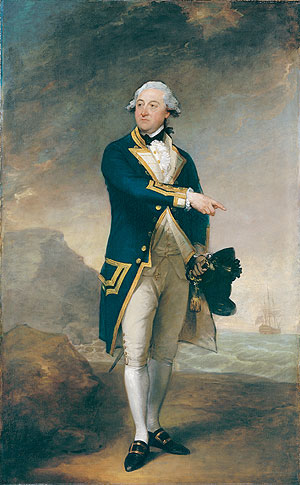
1785 portrait of Gell by Gilbert Stuart

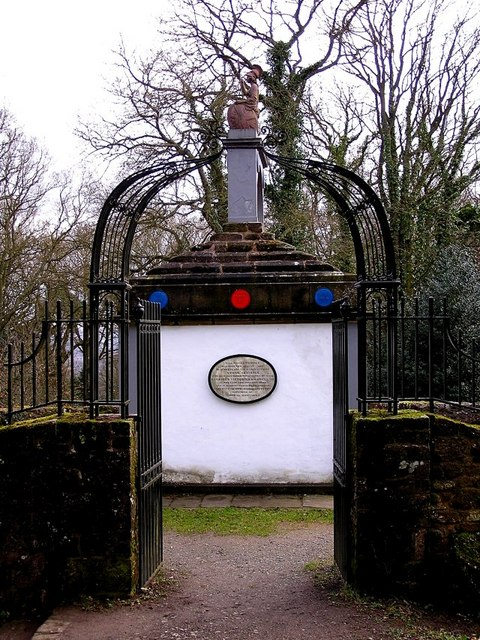
Monument erected in honour of sixteen admirals, including Gell

Gell was born in 1740 to another John Gell of Hopton Hall. His father was born John Eyre but had taken the name Gell when he inherited the Gell fortune. Although his father had assumed the name Gell, this Gell was the great Grandson of the parliamentarian soldier, the first baronet, Sir John Gell The children of his elder brother, Philip Eyre Gell of Hopton Hall were mentioned in Gell's will.

== Midshipman ==
The first known reference to Gell's career is when he joins HMS Prince in 1757 and was promoted to Lieutenant on board HMS Conqueror in 1760 which was to be wrecked the same year.

== Captain ==
In 1776 he was appointed captain of the three-year-old HMS Thetis. With this ship he served in the American, The Mediterranean and the Channel Fleets until he was given command of the Monarca. This ship was unusual in that it had been built in 1756 and for the first 24 years it had been part of the Spanish Navy before being captured by the British at the Battle of Cape St. Vincent in 1780. Gell who was under the orders of Sir Samuel Hood to go to the West Indies. However the ship lost its mast in a storm and was obliged to return to Britain for refitting.

Gell was off the Indian coast during Sir Edward Hughes' five actions against the French admiral Bailli de Suffren when Gell was in command of the 68 gun HMS Monarca.

Gell and the Monarca did take part in the Battle of Cuddalore on 20 June 1783. The battle was the last of the American War of Independence between a rival French and British fleet. The battle which took place off the coast of India near Cuddalore was inconclusive and was remarkable in that peace had already been signed in Europe, but the news had not been heard in Asia. The 200 or so soldiers killed were lost to a war already abandoned.

Gell returned to Europe in 1784 and received no command until 1790 when he was appointed to his last captaincy, of HMS Excellent.

== Admiral ==
On 1 February 1793 he was appointed to be Rear-Admiral of the Blue, and raised his flag on HMS St George. The St George was under the command of Captain Foley, later Sir Thomas Foley and "Hero of the Nile". Whilst in the Mediterranean with his division of the fleet, on 14 April 1793 he was able to seize a French Privateer and its Spanish registered prize the St Jago. These ships were said to be one of the most valuable prizes ever brought to England. The prize was said to contain two million dollars and packages to the value of 200,000 to 300,000 pounds. The capture of this ship and its condemnation as a prize of war (rather than being returned to its Spanish owners) was said to be one of the causes for the subsequent war with Spain.

The ownership of the Spanish ship was a matter of some debate and was not settled until 4 February 1795, when the value of the cargo was put at £935,000. At this time all the crew, captains, officers and admirals could expect to share in this prize, but it was Gell who had commanded the squadron. Admiral Lord Hood's share was £50,000. The ships that conveyed her to Portsmouth were the St George, HMS Egmont, HMS Edgar, HMS Ganges and HMS Phaeton.

In October 1793 at the raid on Genoa, his division of the fleet was able to obtain the surrender of a French frigate, the Modeste, which had abused the neutrality of the port of Genoa. The battle was small and resulted in the death of one Frenchman from musket fire. The authorities at Genoa approved that the Modeste was taken as a spoil of war. After this he had to return to England for the last time due to ill health. The capture of the Modeste was to have repercussions as again in 1794 the crew of the merchant ship Betty were murdered by French forces.

Hughes commissioned Gell's portrait from Sir Joshua Reynolds. He bequeathed the picture to Sir Hugh Palliser, who gave the painting to the Greenwich Hospital only a few years later, on his death in 1796. Gell was also involved in Hood's occupation on Toulon.

Gell also sat for a portrait in 1785, when he completed his captaincy of the Monarca. This time the portrait was full length and by the visiting American painter, Gilbert Stuart. Stuart was attempting only his second full-length portrait under the guidance of Sir Joshua Reynolds.

== Retirement and legacy ==
Despite taking no further commands, Gell was able to make his way to be an Admiral of the White as naval promotions were strictly by seniority as superiors either died or were moved aside.

In 1800 Gell was treated to an honour where his name was chosen by the Kymin Club to be among sixteen British Admirals to have their names and victories recorded on a special naval monument. The Kymin Club was a dining club presided over by the Duke of Beaufort who had built a special round house on Kymin Hill east of Monmouth. At the end of the eighteenth century they arranged for a naval monument to be built to honour the sixteen admirals and the second anniversary of the Battle of the Nile.

When Gell died in 1806 at his home in Crickhowell in South Wales, he had left no wife or children who might have inherited the Gell's holdings in Derbyshire. He left over four thousand pounds to his sisters, friends and to Philip Gell's children. His nephew Sir William Gell was a noted archaeologist.
