= Stonhouse baronets =

Title in the Baronetage of England

There have been three baronetcies created for members of the Stonhouse family, all in the Baronetage of England. Two of the creations are extant as of 2021.

The Stonhouse Baronetcy, of Radley in the County of Berkshire, was created in the Baronetage of England on 7 May 1628 (#253) for William Stonhouse. He was the eldest son of George Stonhouse (died 1573), sometime Clerk of the Green Cloth. The second Baronet sat as Member of Parliament for Abingdon. The third Baronet also represented Abingdon in the House of Commons. He disinherited his eldest son, George, and attempted to eliminate him from succession to the baronetcy. In 1670 he surrendered his patent and on 5 May 1670 he obtained a new patent (with the same territorial designation), with remainder to his two younger sons, and with the precedency of the original creation. However, upon the third Baronet's death, his eldest son successfully claimed the original baronetcy, while his younger brother John succeeded in the baronetcy created by the new patent. The line of the fourth Baronet failed on the death of the sixth Baronet in 1740 and the baronetcy passed to the fourth Baronet of the 1670 creation. The second and third Baronets of this creation had represented Abingdon and Berkshire respectively in the House of Commons. The eleventh Baronet was a physician, Anglican clergyman and preacher.

The Stonhouse Baronetcy, of Amberden Hall, Debden in the County of Essex, was created in the Baronetage of England on 11 June 1641 (#303) for James Stonhouse. He was the son of Sir James Stonhouse Kt. (youngest son of the aforementioned George Stonhouse) and the nephew of the first Baronet of the 1628 creation. The title became extinct on the death of the sixth Baronet on 13 April 1695.

== Stonhouse baronets, of Radley (1628) ==
- Sir William Stonhouse, 1st Baronet (c. 1556–1632)
- Sir John Stonhouse, 2nd Baronet (c. 1602–1632)
- Sir George Stonhouse, 3rd Baronet (c. 1608 – c. 1675) (new patent created in 1670. See Stonhouse baronets of Radley (1670) below))
- Sir George Stonhouse, 4th Baronet (c. 1638 – c. 1700)
- Sir George Stonhouse, 5th Baronet (died 1737)
- Sir John Stonhouse, 6th Baronet (died 1740)
- Sir John Stonhouse, 7th Baronet (c. 1710–c. 1767) (had succeeded in the baronetcy of 1670 in 1733)
- Sir John Stonhouse, 8th Baronet (died c. 1770)
- Sir William Stonhouse, 9th Baronet (c. 1714–1777)
- Sir James Stonhouse, 10th Baronet (c. 1719–1792)
- Sir James Stonhouse, 11th Baronet (1716–1795)
- Sir Thomas Stonhouse, 12th Baronet (c. 1744–1810)
- Sir John Brooke Stonhouse, 13th Baronet (c. 1797–1848)
- Sir Timothy Vansittart Stonhouse, 14th Baronet (1799–1866)
- Sir Henry Vansittart Stonhouse, 15th Baronet (1827–1884)
- Sir Ernest Hay Stonhouse, 16th Baronet (1855–1937)
- Sir Arthur Allan Stonhouse, 17th Baronet (1885–1967)
- Sir Philip Allan Stonhouse, 18th Baronet (1916–1993)
- Sir Michael Philip Stonhouse, 19th Baronet (born 1948)

The heir apparent is the present baronet's eldest son Allan James Stonhouse (born 1981).

== Stonhouse baronets, of Amberden Hall (1641) ==
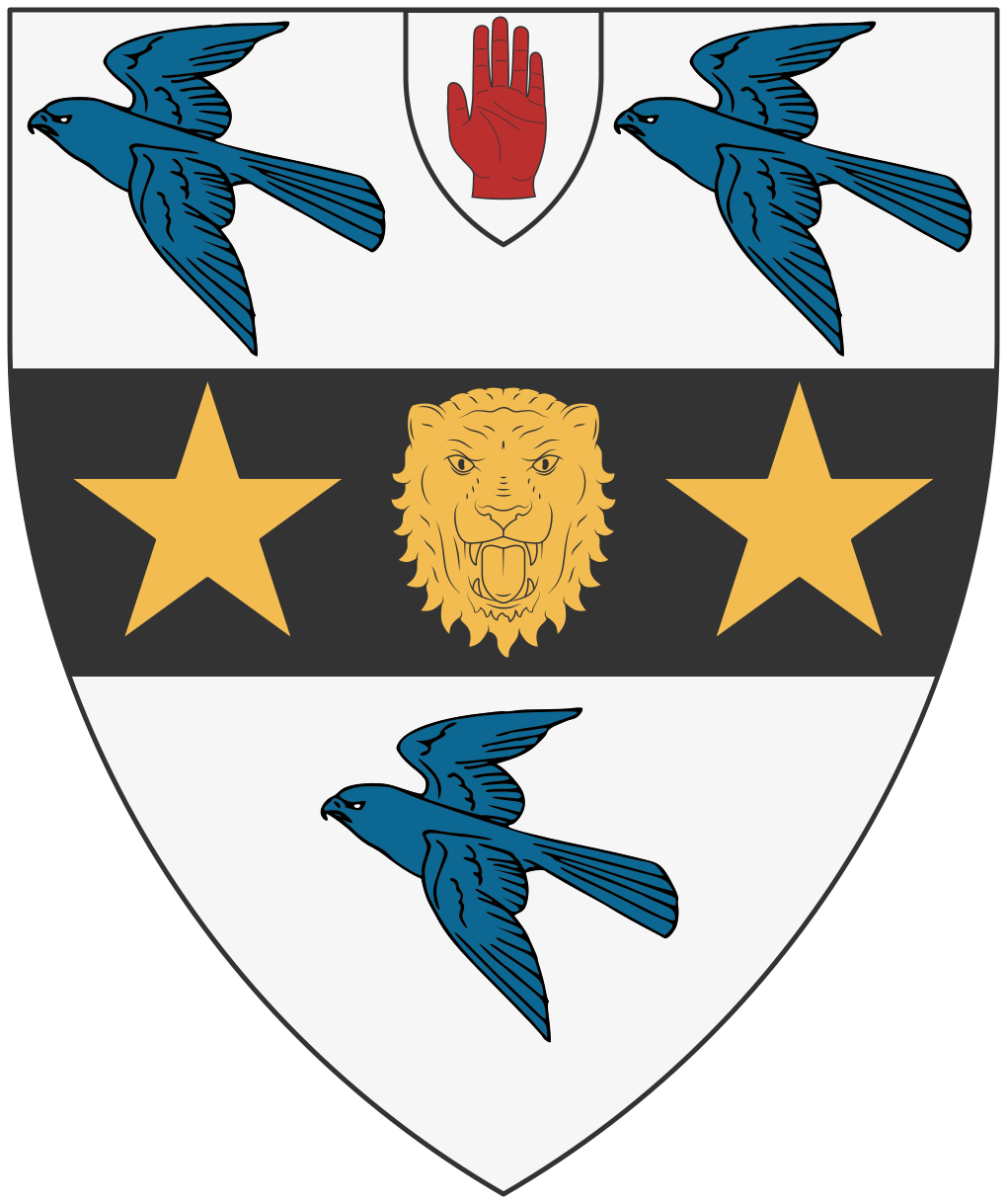
Stonhouse of Amberden Hall

- Sir James Stonhouse, 1st Baronet (died c. 1652)
- Sir James Stonhouse, 2nd Baronet (died c. 1654)
- Sir Blewet Stonhouse, 3rd Baronet (c. 1653–c. 1670)
- Sir George Stonhouse, 4th Baronet (died c. 1675)
- Sir John Stonhouse, 5th Baronet (died 1681)
- Sir George Stonhouse, 6th Baronet (1679–1695)

== Stonhouse baronets, of Radley (1670) ==
- Sir George Stonhouse, 3rd and 1st Baronet (c. 1608–c. 1675)
- Sir John Stonhouse, 2nd Baronet (c. 1639–1700)
- Sir John Stonhouse, 3rd Baronet (c. 1672–1733)
- Sir John Stonhouse, 4th Baronet (c. 1710–c. 1767) (succeeded in the 1628 baronetcy in 1740)

see above for further succession
