= Wirksworth Town Hall =

Municipal building in Wirksworth, Derbyshire, England

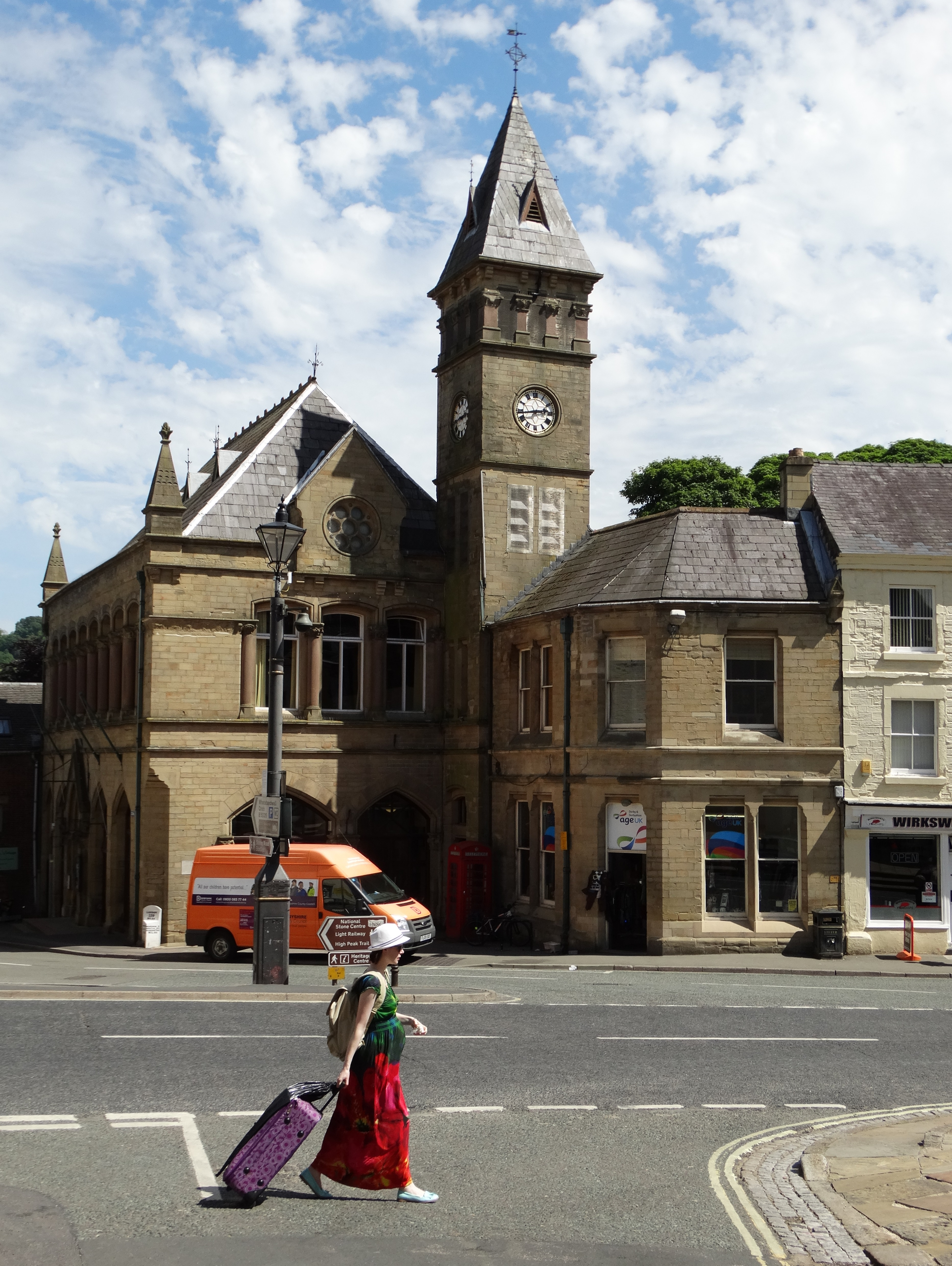
- Wirksworth Town Hall

- Shown in Derbyshire
- 53.0826°N 1.5732°W
- Location: Coldwell Street, Wirksworth

History
- Built: 1873

Site notes
- Architect: A. B. Bradby
- Architectural style: Italianate style

Wirksworth Town Hall is a municipal building in Coldwell Street, Wirksworth, Derbyshire, England. The town hall, which was the headquarters of Wirksworth Urban District Council, now accommodates the local public library.

== History ==
The construction of the current building was an initiative by the local masonic lodge to create an events' venue in the town. It was commissioned and financed by a specially formed company known as the "Wirksworth Town Hall and Market House Company". Construction of the new building started in 1871. It was designed by A. B. Bradby in the Italianate style, built in ashlar stone from Yorkshire at a cost of £6,000 and was completed in 1873.

The building was arcaded on the ground floor, so that butter markets could be held, with the main hall on the first floor. The design involved an asymmetrical main frontage with five bays facing north onto Coldwell Street; the central bay featured a doorway with a pointed archivolt while the left-hand opening was wide enough for a carriage and there was a row of six rounded headed windows separated by colonettes on the first floor. On the western elevation, there was a row of three rounded headed windows separated by colonettes on the first floor, with a gable above containing a rose window. There was a five-stage clock tower to the southwest of the main block: it featured a doorway in the first stage, two sash windows in the second stage, pairs of louvered openings in the third stage, clock faces in the fourth stage and a pilastered belfry in the fifth stage. It was surmounted by a pyramid-shaped roof. Internally, the principal room was the main hall, which was used for petty session and county court hearings.

Following significant population growth, largely associated with the silk and tape manufacturing industries, the area became an urban district in 1894. The new council acquired the building for use as its offices in 1904. The main hall was used to show silent films from the start of the First World War and continued to be used as a cinema until after the end of the Second World War. The building served as the headquarters of the urban district council for much of the 20th century, but ceased to be the local seat of government when the enlarged Derbyshire Dales District Council was formed in 1974. The building subsequently became the meeting place of Wirksworth Town Council, and part of the building was converted for use as a local public library.

The building was the venue, in November 1978, for a public meeting which launched a regeneration initiative in the town which ultimately led to the creation of a local heritage centre, a visitor centre at Carsington Water and, in June 1983, a Europa Nostra Award. In 1995, the town hall also became a focal point for the newly launched annual Wirksworth Festival which celebrated and promoted arts in the town.
