= Abraham Bennet =

English clergyman and physicist

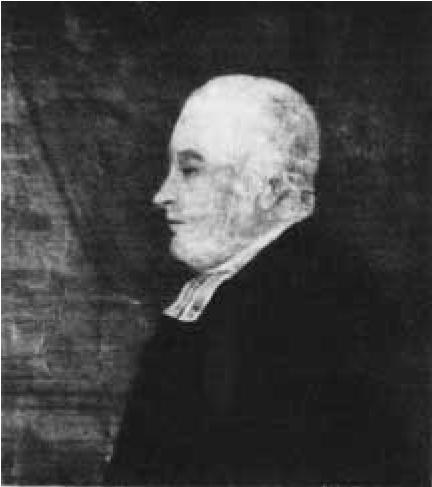
Portrait of Bennet by an unknown artist (St Mary's Church, Wirksworth)

Abraham Bennet FRS (baptised 20 December 1749 – buried 9 May 1799) was an English clergyman and physicist, the inventor of the gold-leaf electroscope and developer of an improved magnetometer. Alessandro Volta cited Bennet as a key influence on his work, although Bennet's own work was curtailed by the political turbulence of his time.

== Life ==
Abraham was baptised in Taxal, Derbyshire, the son of another Abraham Bennet, a schoolmaster, and his wife Ann née Fallowes. There is no record of him having attended university but he is recorded as a teacher at Wirksworth Grammar School as "MA". He was ordained in London in 1775 and appointed curate at Tideswell and, one year later, additionally at Wirksworth, with a combined annual stipend of £60. He further became rector of Fenny Bentley, domestic chaplain to the Duke of Devonshire, perpetual curate of Woburn and librarian to the Duke of Bedford.

Bennet had broad interests in natural philosophy and was associated with, though not a member of, the Lunar Society and the Derby Philosophical Society. He was particularly close to Erasmus Darwin. Darwin suggested that Bennet make electrical measurements as part of an investigation into electricity and weather. Bennet then worked assiduously to establish his expertise in electricity, achieving a reputation sufficient to take part in a meeting with Tiberius Cavallo, William Nicholson and Volta in London in 1782.

== New Experiments ==
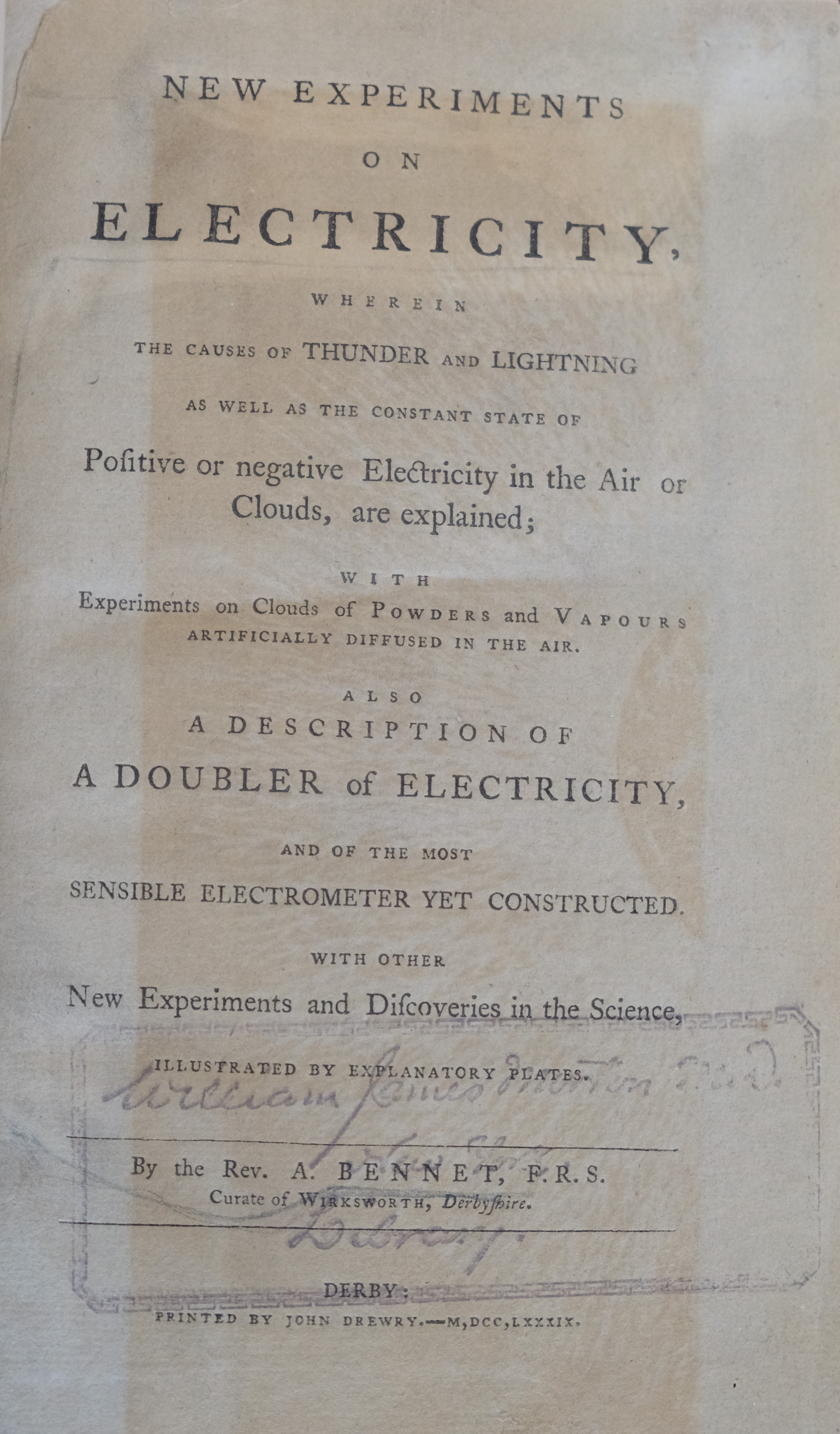
First page of a 1789 edition of Bennet's New Experiments

Bennet published New Experiments on Electricity in 1789. In it, he described:

- The gold-leaf electroscope;
- A doubler of electricity, already announced in a paper communicated to the Royal Society by Rev. Richard Kaye FRS, Dean of Lincoln in 1787; and
- A theory of electricity that anticipated Volta's contact theory. Bennet's work was a key element in leading Volta to the contact theory and the development of the voltaic pile.

Bennet described experiments with an electrophorus and the generation of electricity by evaporation. Bennet extended his thinking into various theories about electricity and weather, with electrical explanations of the aurora borealis and meteors. He interpreted lightning as the release of electrical charge from clouds, and went on to hypothesise that rain was caused by lightning and also that earthquakes had an electrical origin.

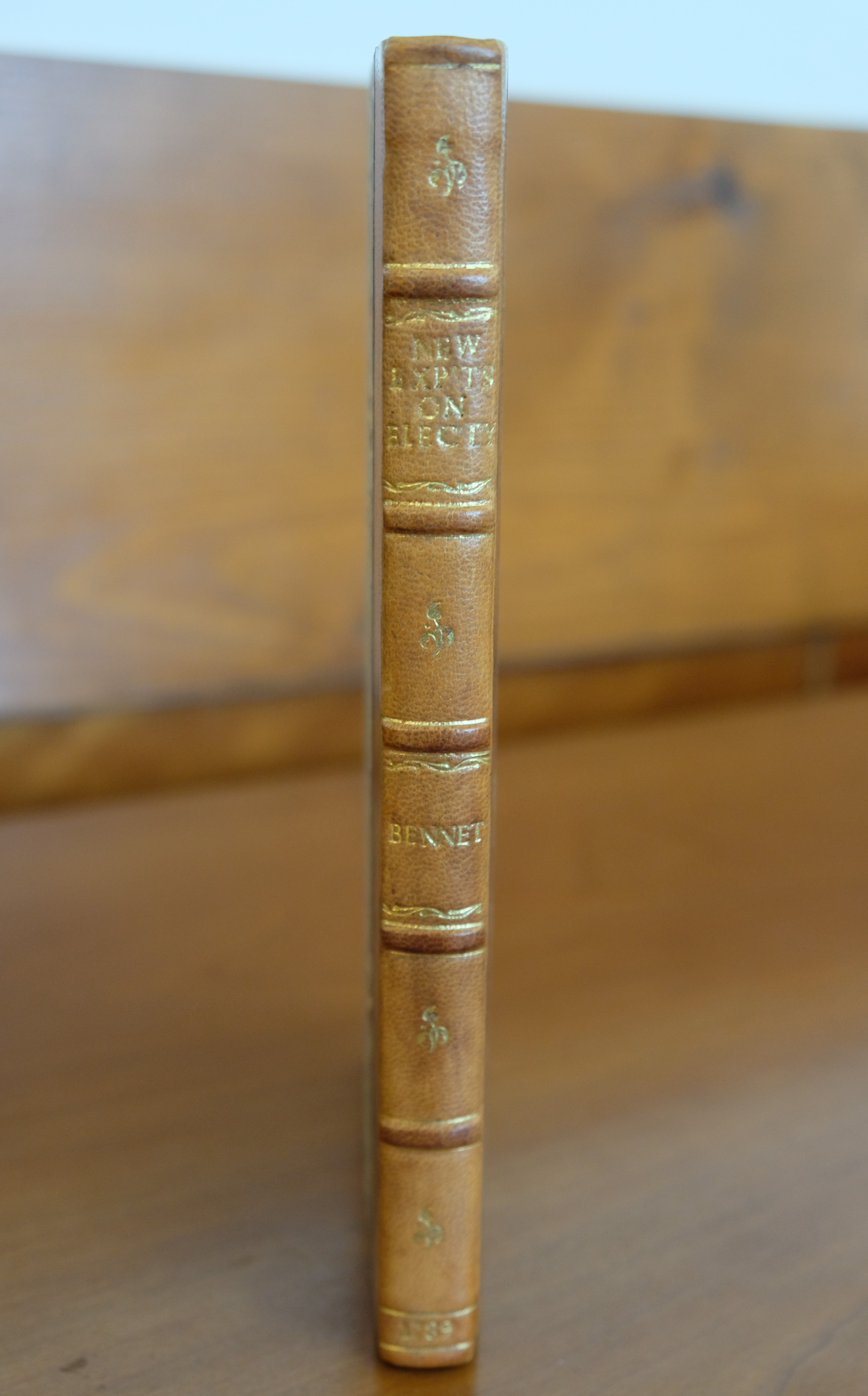
1789 edition of New Experiments

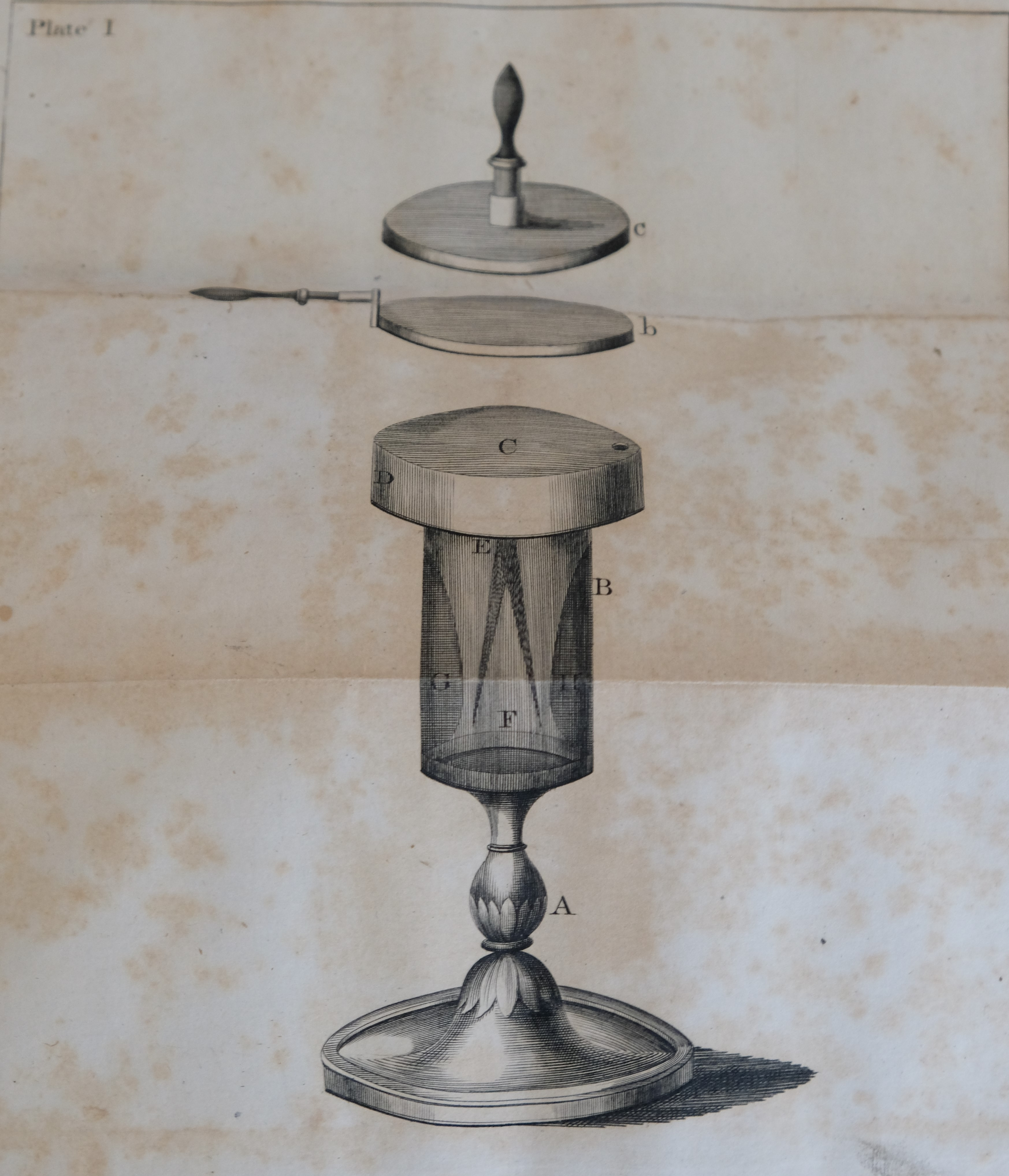
Illustrated figure from Bennet's New Experiments (plate I)

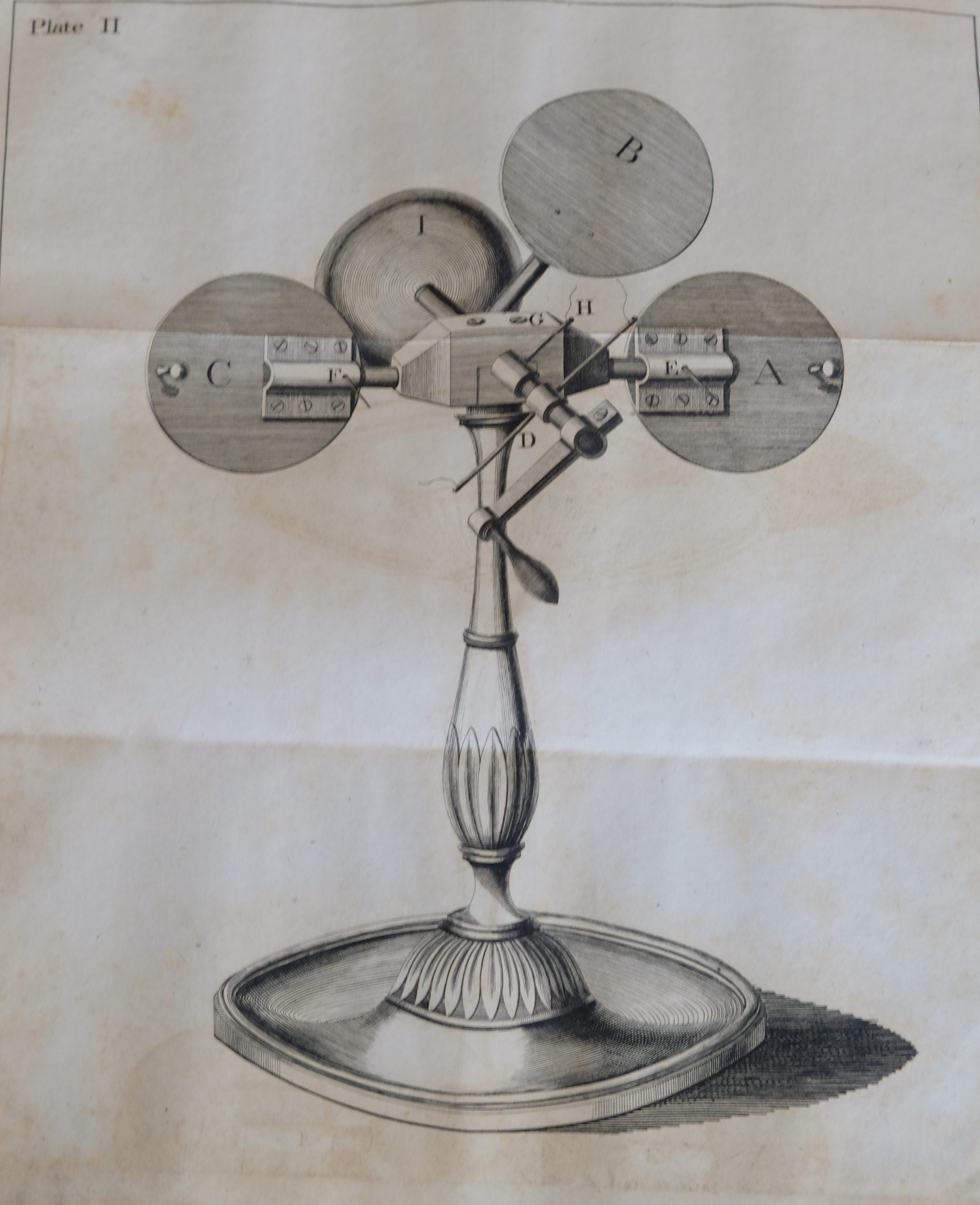
Illustrated figure from Bennet's New Experiments (plate II)

== Politics ==
Among Bennet's other patrons were Joseph Banks, George Adams and the Wirksworth squires, the Gell family. The Gells, Kaye, Banks, Adams, and the Dukes of Devonshire and Bedford were all establishment figures whose hostility to the radicals of the Lunar and Derby Philosophical Societies intensified in the British reaction to the French Revolution. Bennet found it increasingly necessary to take sides, signing the Gells' petition against Jacobinism in 1795. Bennet's scientific work ends around this date, possibly from ill-health but also possibly from his inability to resolve the tensions among his erstwhile supporters.

== Personal life ==
He married Jane (died 1826) and the couple had six daughters and two sons. Bennet died of a "severe illness".

== Honours and memorial ==
- Fellow of the Royal Society, (1789);
- There is a memorial plaque in St Mary's Church, Wirksworth and a portrait by an unknown artist.

== Bibliography ==
- Obituary:
  - Derby Mercury, 23 May 1799

- Elliott, P. (1999). "Abraham Bennet F.R.S. (1749-1799): a provincial electrician in eighteenth-century England". Notes and Records of the Royal Society of London. 53 (1): 59–78. doi:10.1098/rsnr.1999.0063. S2CID 144062032. Subscription required for full article. Abstract accessed 26 May 2014.
- Heilbron. J. L. (2000) [1979]. Electricity in the 17th and 18th Centuries: A Study of Early Modern Physics (New ed.). New York: Dover Publications. pp. 450–451, 457–458. ISBN 978-0-486-40688-6.
- Mottelay, P. F. (2007) [1922]. A Bibliographical History of Electricity and Magnetism. London: Read Books. pp. 289–291. ISBN 978-1-4067-5476-6.
- Schaffer, S. (2004) "Bennet, Abraham (bap. 1749, d. 1799)", Oxford Dictionary of National Biography, Oxford University Press, accessed 2 September 2007 (subscription, Wikipedia Library access or UK public library membership required)
- Shurlock, F. W. (1925). "Abraham Bennet FRS". Science Progress: 452–464.
- Walker, W.C. (1936). "The detection and estimation of electric charges in the eighteenth century". Annals of Science. 1: 66–100. doi:10.1080/00033793600200071.
