= Wirksworth =

Market town in Derbyshire, England

Coordinates: 53.082°N 1.574°W

- Town and Civil Parish
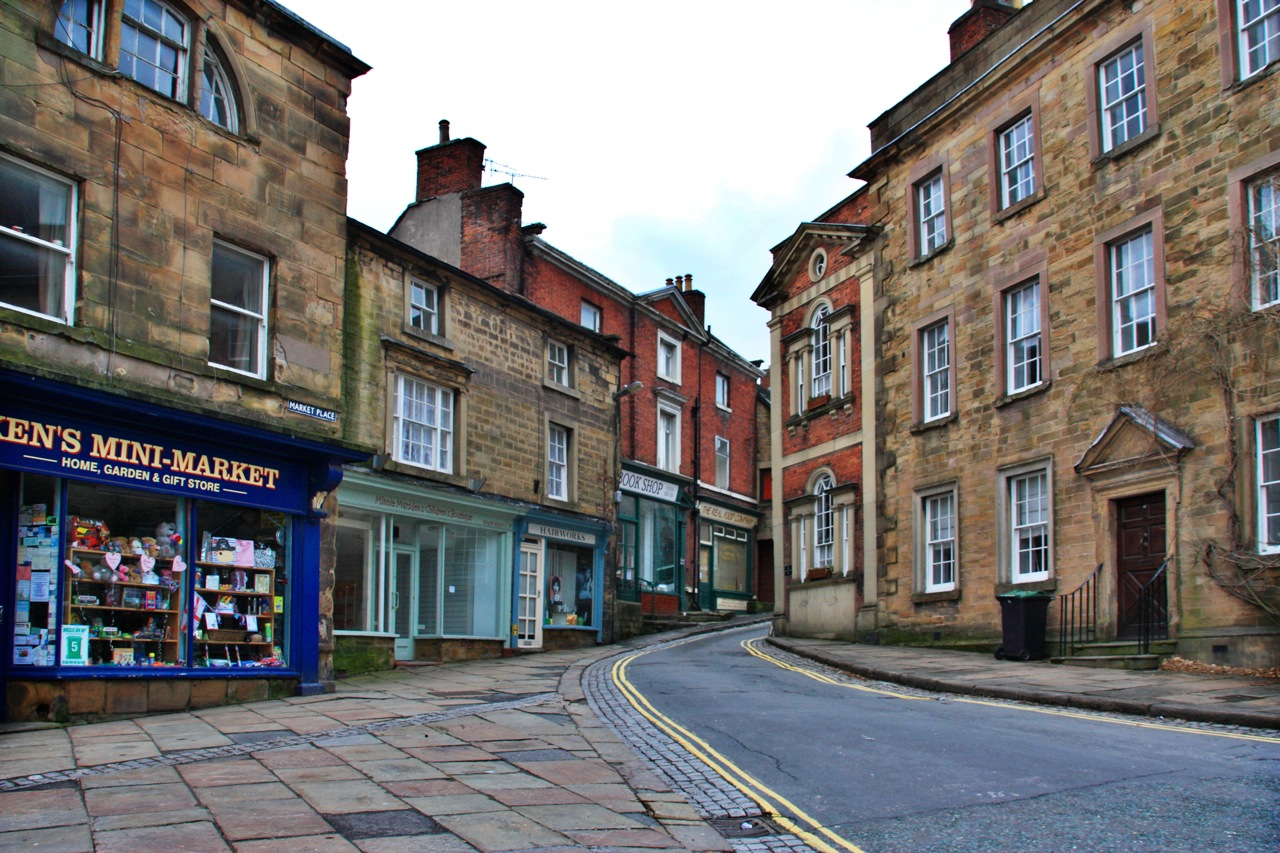
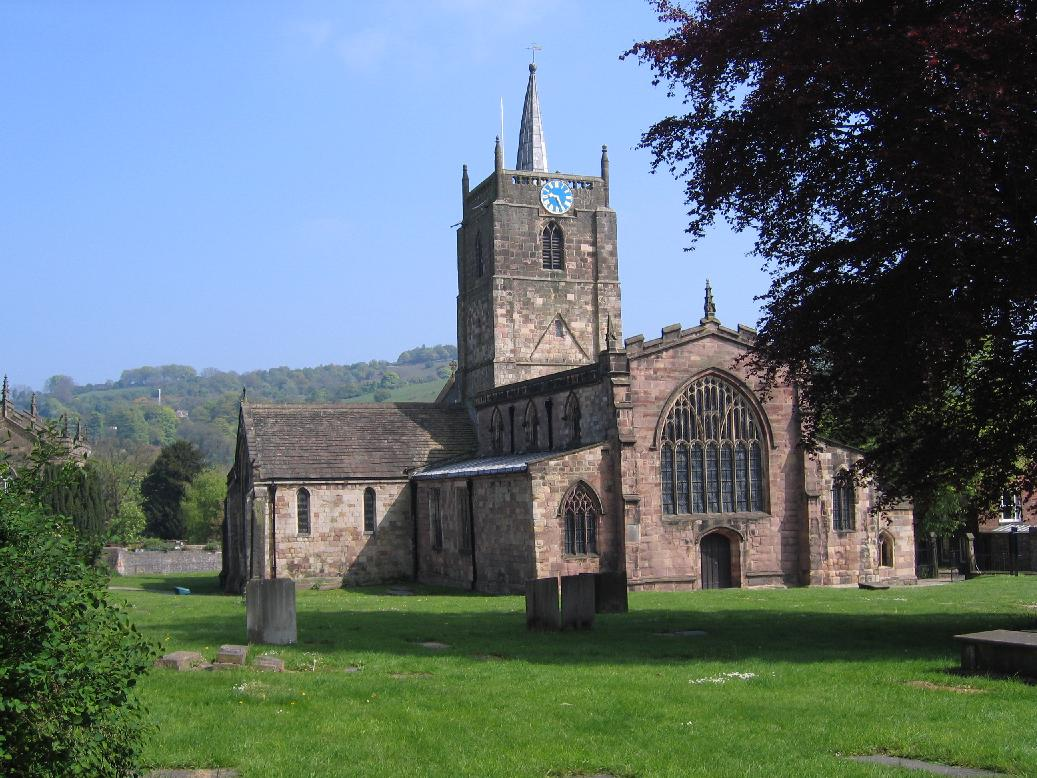
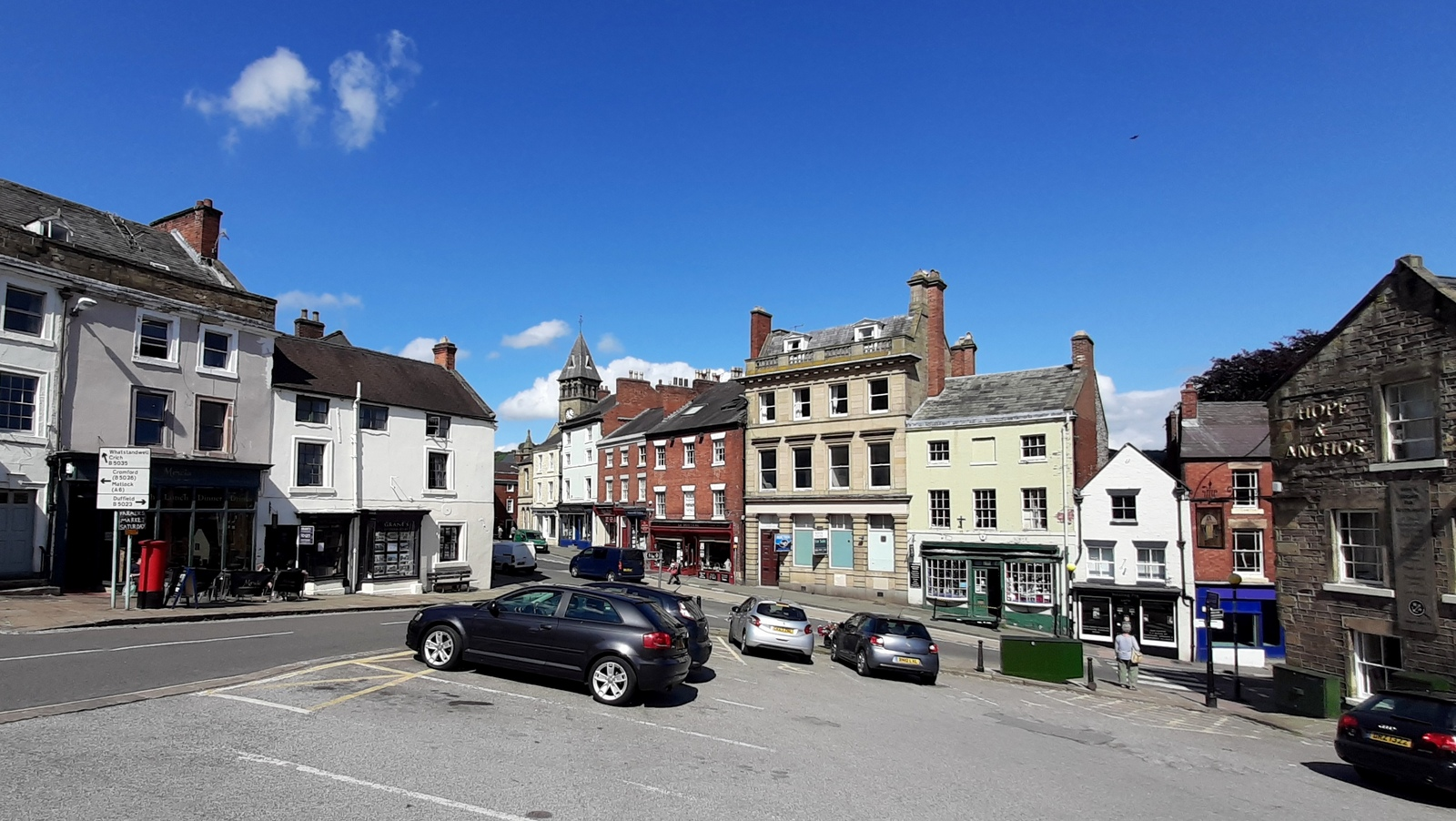
- Market Place St Mary's Church St John's Street

- Location within Derbyshire
- Population: 4,902 (2021 census)
- OS grid reference: SK2853
- District: Derbyshire Dales
- Shire county: Derbyshire
- Region: East Midlands
- Country: England
- Sovereign state: United Kingdom
- Post town: MATLOCK
- Postcode district: DE4
- Dialling code: 01629
- Police: Derbyshire
- Fire: Derbyshire
- Ambulance: East Midlands
- UK Parliament: Derbyshire Dales
- Website: https://www.wirksworthtowncouncil.gov.uk/

Wirksworth is a market town and civil parish in the Derbyshire Dales district of Derbyshire, England. Its population was 4,902 in the 2021 census. Wirksworth contains the source of the River Ecclesbourne. The town was granted a market charter by Edward I in 1306 and still holds a market on Tuesdays in the Memorial Gardens. The parish church of St Mary's is thought to date from 653. The town developed as a centre for lead mining and stone quarrying. Many lead mines were owned by the Gell family of nearby Hopton Hall.

== Name ==
The name was recorded as Werchesworde in the Domesday Book of 1086 A.D. Outlying farms (berewicks) were Cromford, Middleton, Hopton, Wellesdene [sic], Carsington, Kirk Ireton and Callow. It gave its name to the earlier Wirksworth wapentake or hundred. The Survey of English Place-Names records Wyrcesuuyrthe in 835, Werchesworde in 1086, and Wirksworth(e) in 1536.

The toponym might be "Weorc's enclosure", or "fortified enclosure".

== History ==
=== Early history ===
The origins of Wirksworth are thought to have related to the presence of thermal warm water springs nearby, coupled with a sheltered site at the head of a glaciated valley, able to yield cereals such as oats and provide timber suitable for building.

The Wirksworth area in the White Peak is known for Neolithic and Bronze Age remains.

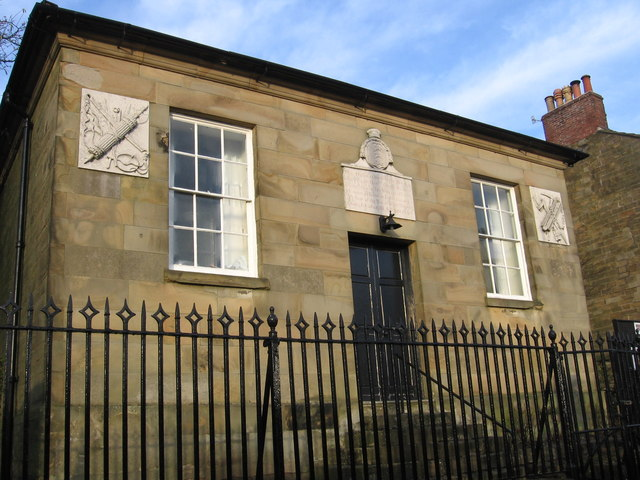
Moot Hall on Chapel Lane

Woolly rhinoceros bones were found by lead miners in 1822 in Dream Cave, on private land between Wirksworth and present-day Carsington Water. A nearby cave at Carsington Pasture yielded prehistoric finds in the late 20th century.

=== Lead mining ===
In Roman Britain, the limestone area of today's Derbyshire yielded lead, the prime site probably being Lutudarum in the hills south and west of present-day Matlock. Wirksworth is a candidate for the site of Lutudarum. Roman roads from Wirksworth lead to Buxton (The Street) and to Brough-on-Noe (The Portway). The town has the oldest charter of any in the Peak District, dating from 835, when the Abbess of Wirksworth granted nearby land to Duke Humbert of Mercia.

Many lead mines in Anglo-Saxon times were owned by Repton Abbey. Three of these are identified in Wirksworth's Domesday Book entry from 1086. Scientists studying a Swiss glacial ice core have found that levels of lead in European air pollution between 1170 and 1216 were similar to those during the Industrial Revolution, pointing to the local lead and silver smelting around Wirksworth, Castleton etc. as the main source with a remarkable correlation. There is a tiny carving in Wirksworth Church of a miner with a pick and whisket (basket); the figure is known as "T'Owd Man of Bonsall." It stood in Bonsall Church for centuries, but was moved for safekeeping during a restoration project. It was later found in a Bonsall garden and moved to Wirksworth by the vicar of the time. The ore was washed out through a sieve, whose iron wire had been drawn in Hathersage since the Middle Ages. Smelting took place in boles, hence the name Bolehill. The lead industry, the miner, the ore and the waste were also known collectively as "t'owd man".

A barmote court was established in the town in 1288 during the reign of Edward I in order to regulate lead mining; anyone had a right to dig for ore wherever he chose, except in churchyards, gardens or roadways. All that was needed for a claim was to place one's stowce (winch) on the site and extract enough ore to pay tribute to the "barmaster". The present Moot Hall, where the barmote court met, dates from 1814.

By the 18th century, there were many thousand lead mines worked individually. Daniel Defoe gives a first-hand account of such a family and the miner at work. At this time, the London Lead Company was formed to provide finance for deeper mines with drainage channels, called soughs, and introduce Newcomen steam-engine pumps.

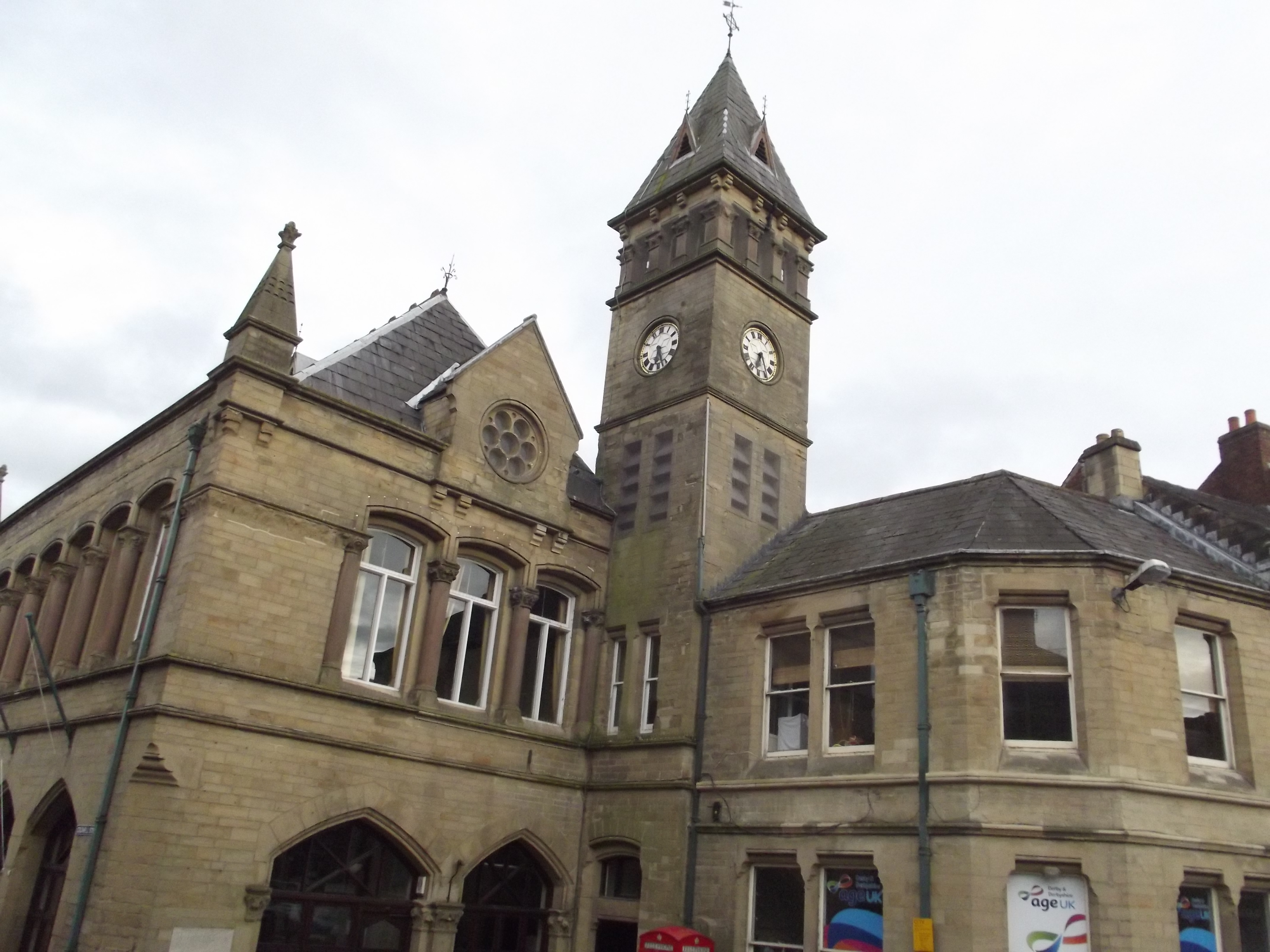
Wirksworth Town Hall

Many institutions in the area have ties with the Gell family of nearby Hopton Hall. One member, Sir John Gell, 1st Baronet, fought on Parliament's side in the Civil War. A predecessor, Anthony Gell, founded the local grammar school, and a successor, Phillip Gell, opened the Via Gellia (perhaps an allusion to the Roman Via Appia), a road from the family lead mines round Wirksworth to a smelter in Cromford. More recently he has been remembered in the name of Anthony Gell School.

=== Limestone ===
The carboniferous limestone around Wirksworth has been much quarried over the town's history, resulting in several rock faces and cliffs surrounding the town. There was a workhouse from 1724 to 1829, called Babington House, standing on Green Hill (grid reference SK286541) and housing 60 inmates.

=== Industrial Revolution ===
In 1777, Richard Arkwright leased land and premises for a corn mill from Philip Eyre Gell of Hopton and converted it to spin cotton, using his water frame. It was the world's first cotton mill to use a steam engine to replenish the millpond that drove its waterwheel. The mill was adjacent to another, Speedwell Mill, owned by John Dalley, a local merchant. Arkwright's mill was sublet in 1792, when Arkwright's son, Richard, began to sell off family property and move into banking. It was named Haarlem Mill in 1815, when converted to weaving tape by Madely, Hackett and Riley, who had set up Haarlem Tape Works in Derby in 1806.

The population was recorded as 4,122 inhabitants in the 1841 census.

In 1879 the Wheatcroft family, which produced tape at Speedwell Mill, expanded into Haarlem. The two mills together employed 230; their weekly output was said to equal the circumference of the earth; Wirksworth was the main producer of red tape for Whitehall. These mills were close together at Miller's Green next to the Derby road. Haarlem Mill now houses an art collective; Speedwell Mill has been replaced by private houses and a carpentry workshop. The growing prosperity of the town led to the development of Wirksworth Town Hall in 1871.

== Geography ==
In the 2011 census, Wirksworth civil parish had 2,416 dwellings, 2,256 households and a population of 5,038.

Areas of Wirksworth include Yokecliffe to the west, Gorseybank and Bournebrook to the south-east, Miller's Green to the south-west, and Steeple Grange and Bolehill to the north. Bolehill, although technically a hamlet in its own right in Wirksworth's suburbs, is the oldest and most northerly part of the town, while Yokecliffe is a large estate in the westerly area. Modern houses have been built in the Three Trees area and at the bottom of Steeple Grange (Spring Close and Meerbrook Drive).

In the future, it is planned to build new housing estates to the north of the centre and in the disused Middle Peak Quarry. These will total around 800 houses if they come to fruition.

== Education ==
There are four schools in Wirksworth: Church of England, Wirksworth Junior School, the Anthony Gell School and Callow Park College.

Anthony Gell was a local, requested by Agnes Fearne to build a grammar school on her death. The original site is now a private house on the edge of the churchyard. The current school is an 11–18 comprehensive, built on a larger site by the Hannage Brook with about 800 pupils. The school's five houses are named after Fearne, Arkwright (Sir Richard Arkwright), Wright (Joseph Wright of Derby), Gell and Nightingale (Florence Nightingale). Its catchment area is the town and surrounding villages: Middleton, Carsington, Brassington, Kirk Ireton, Turnditch, Matlock Bath, Cromford and Crich.

== Transport ==
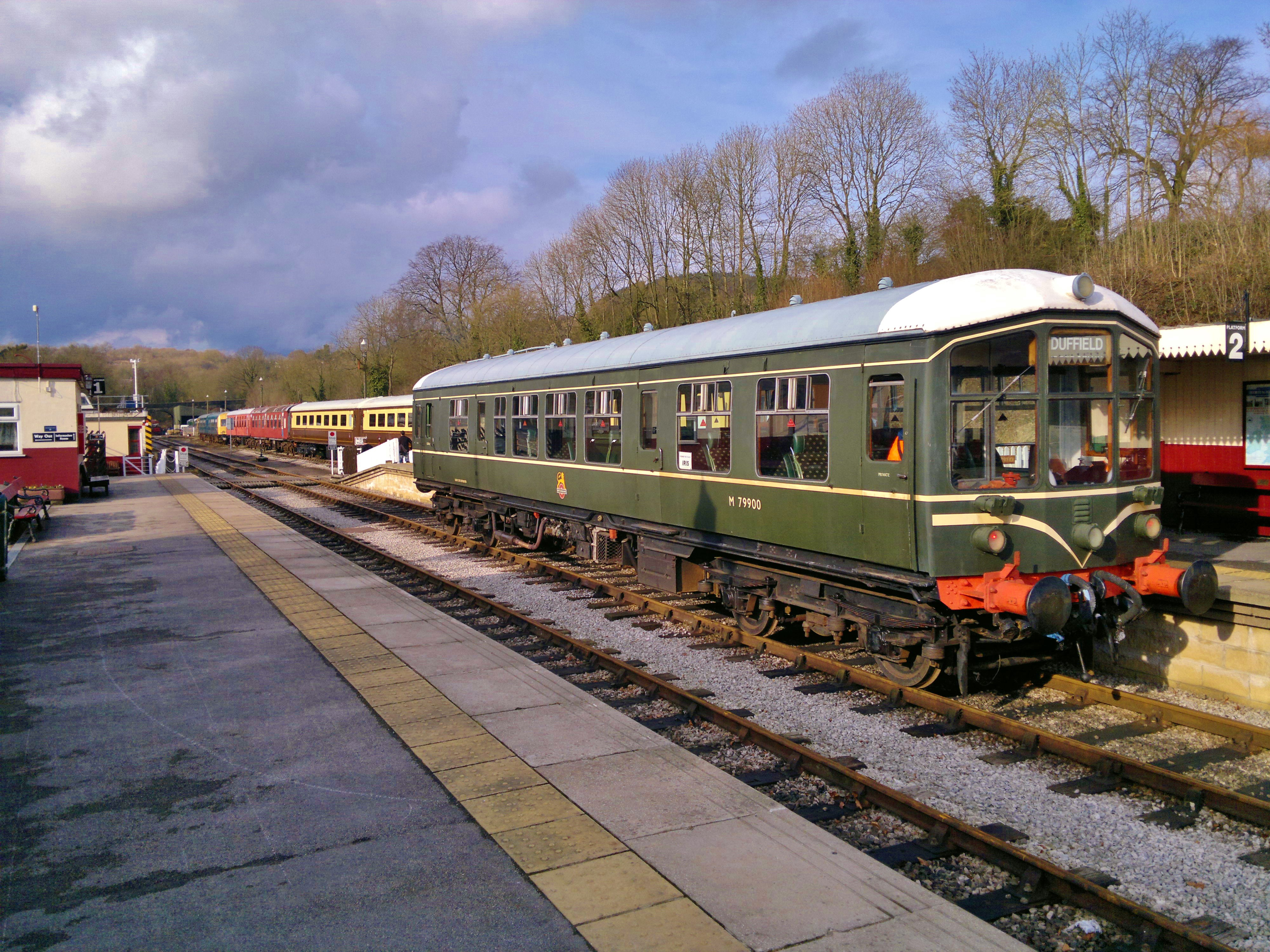
A preserved diesel multiple unit operating a service on the Ecclesbourne Valley Railway

Wirksworth railway station is a stop on the heritage Ecclesbourne Valley Railway. Services operate to and from Duffield, which provides a connection to the National Rail network for ongoing East Midlands Railway services to Nottingham, Derby and Matlock on the Derwent Valley Line.

The town is served by five bus routes:

- 6.1 between Derby and Bakewell, operated by Trent Barton
- little Sixes from Matlock and Middleton, then around the estates in the southern end of Wirksworth, also run by Trent Barton
- X17 to Matlock, Sheffield and Barnsley, operated by Stagecoach Yorkshire
- 110 between Matlock and Ashbourne, operated by Hulleys of Baslow.
- 111 between Matlock and Ashbourne, serving different villages to the 110, operated by Hulleys of Baslow.

== Media ==
Local news and television programmes are provided by BBC East Midlands and ITV Central. Television signals are received from the local relay TV transmitter.

Wirksworth's local radio stations are BBC Radio Derby on 95.3 FM, Capital Midlands on 102.8 FM, and Greatest Hits Radio Midlands on 101.8 FM.

The Matlock Mercury is the town's weekly local newspaper.

== Culture and community ==
=== Events ===
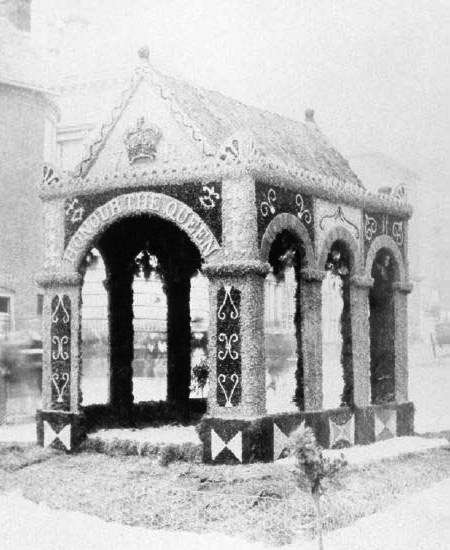
Well or tap dressing in Wirksworth in the 1860s

The Wirksworth Book Festival was launched in 2016 and takes place in early April. It is a sister event to the Wirksworth Festival, celebrating books and reading, particularly local writers.

The Wirksworth well dressing and carnival takes place in early June. This was adapted after the arrival of piped water, so that taps as well as wells are decorated.

The first Sunday after September 8th is Clipping the church, an ancient custom, in which the congregation join hands to encircle the building. This occurs on the Sunday after the Feast of the Nativity, the church's dedication.

The Wirksworth Festival was established in 1995 and takes place in September. It features crafts, exhibitions and street theatre.

In October, the Sunday after the Farmer's Market is Wizarding Day, a Harry Potter fan event.

The Glee Club annual pantomime takes place on the first weekend of December.

=== Community facilities ===
Fanny Shaw's Playing Field, just beyond the centre, is the main recreation area for the north of the town. It includes a play area. In the south is the "Rec", another children's play area, along with cricket and football pitches. There are public toilets in the car park alongside the United Reformed Church at Baromote Croft.

=== Cultural references ===
Haarlem Mill has been mentioned as the possible model for the mill in George Eliot's The Mill on the Floss. The town of Snowfield in George Eliot's Adam Bede is also said to be based in Wirksworth; Dinah Morris, a character in that novel, is based on Eliot's aunt, who lived in Wirksworth and whose husband ran the silk mill, which used to house the Wirksworth Heritage Centre.

Wirksworth was the main location of ITV's Sweet Medicine in 2003, having featured as an occasional location in its forerunner, Peak Practice. More recently, some of Mobile was filmed on a train on the Ecclesbourne Valley Railway, and much of an episode of the BBC series Casualty was set in the town.

Wirksworth features in the 2015 memoir, The Long Road Out of Town, by author and journalist Greg Watts, who grew up there.

Middle Peak Quarry, on the outskirts of Wirksworth, featured in the 2010 music video "Unlikely Hero" by the Hoosiers.

=== Town twinning ===
Wirksworth is twinned with Die in southern France and with Frankenau in the Kellerwald range south-west of the Talgang, Germany, through the Wirksworth Twinning Association.

== Notable residents ==
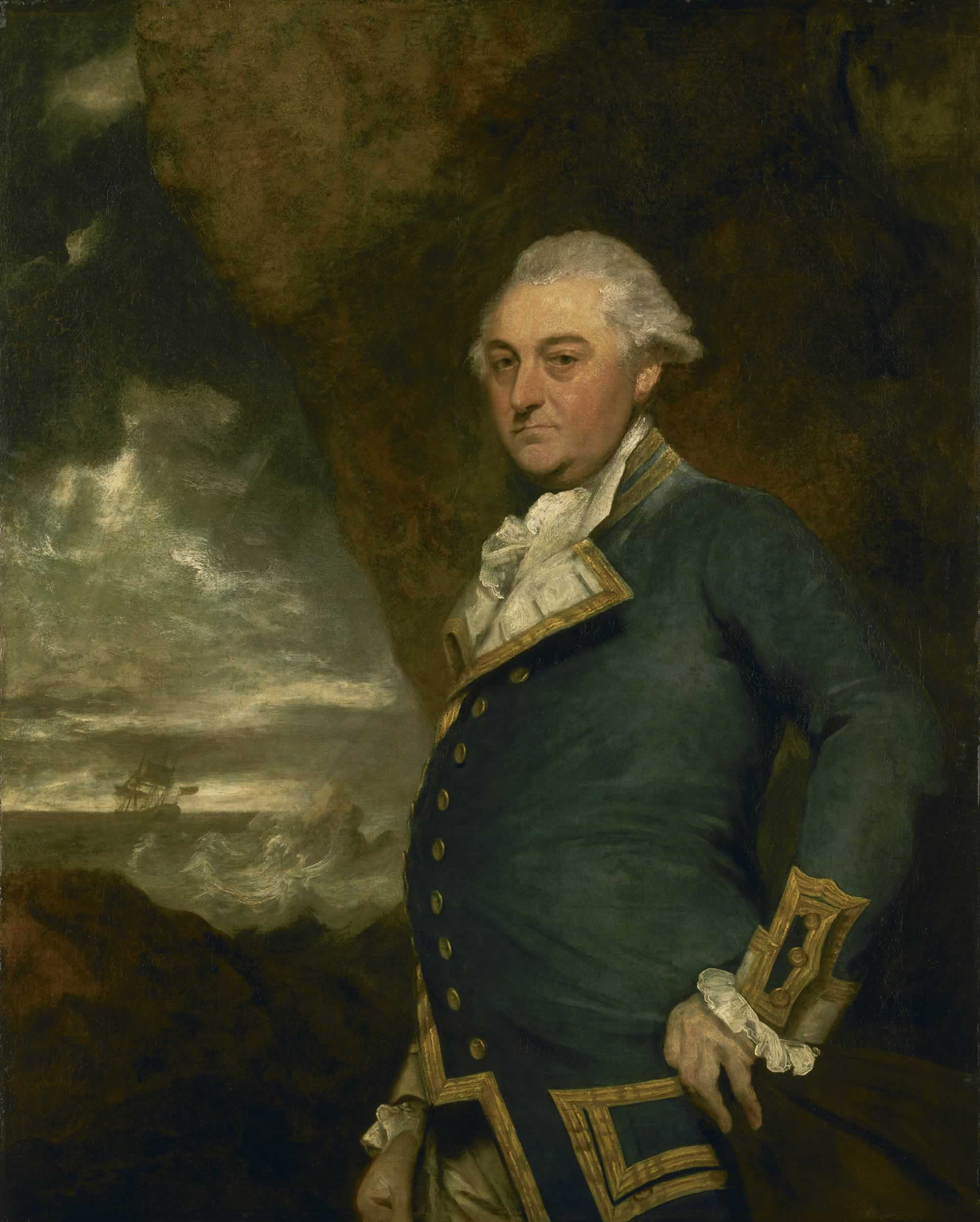
Admiral John Gell, 1786

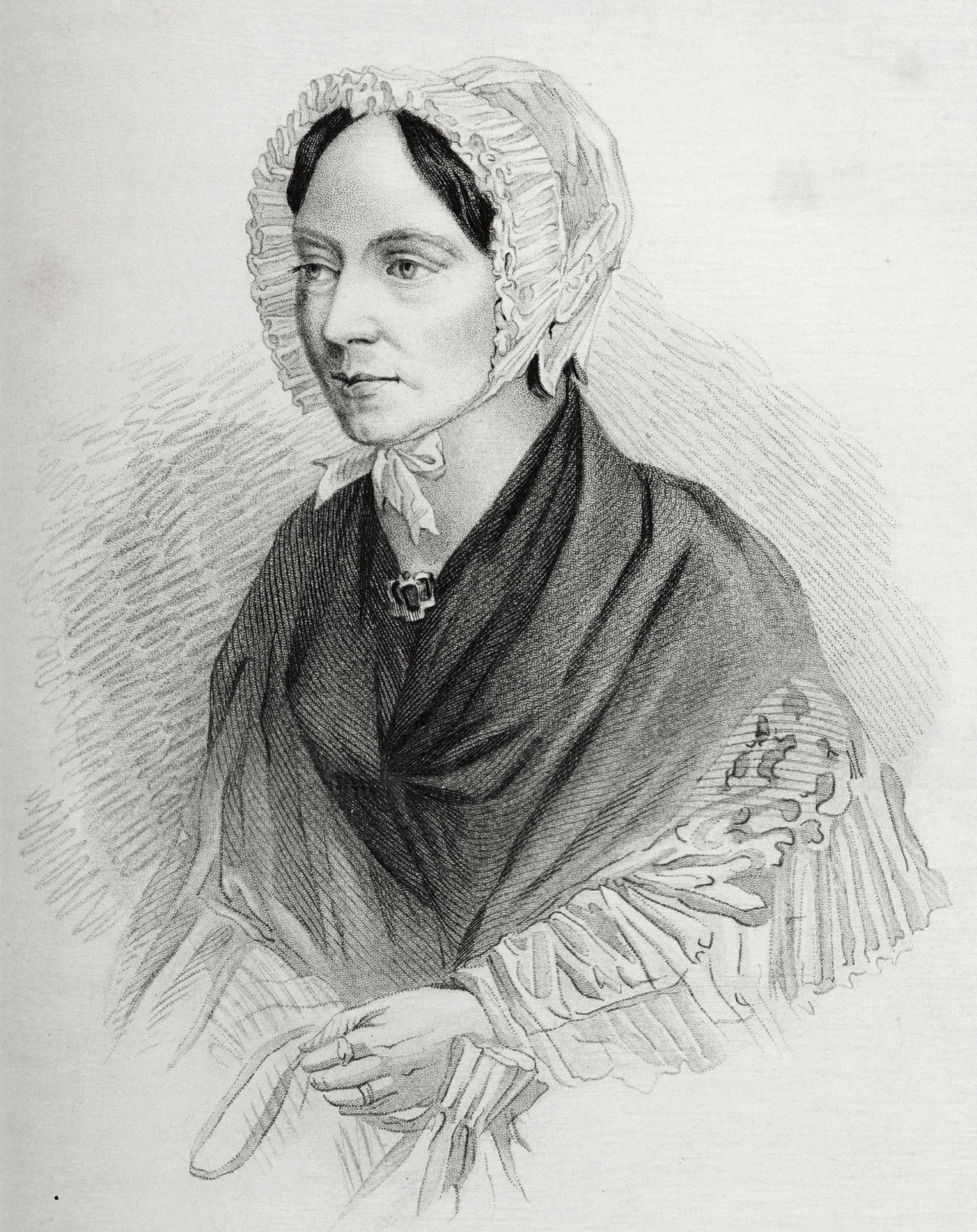
Eliza Fraser

- Anthony Draycot (died 1571) was rector of the parish from 1535 until his imprisonment in 1560. He was the judge at the heresy trial where Joan Waste was condemned to be burnt.
- Francis Hutchinson (1660–1739), born in Carsington, a minister who wrote a book debunking witchcraft prosecutions
- John Woodward (1665–1728), naturalist, antiquarian and geologist, may have been born here.
- Admiral John Gell (c. 1740–1806), Royal Navy officer who was born at Hopton Hall, in nearby Hopton.
- Abraham Bennet (1749–1799) was curate of Wirksworth and did important early work in electricity, in association with Erasmus Darwin, the grandfather of the naturalist Charles Darwin. There is a memorial plaque to him in Wirksworth Church.
- William Hutchins (1792–1841), clergyman and local curate and academic in Tasmania
- Stephen Glover (1794–1870), English author and antiquary
- Thomas Allsop (1795–1880), stockbroker, writer and radical politician
- Eliza Fraser (c. 1798–1858), local woman who was shipwrecked at K'gari, an island off the coast of Queensland, in 1836
- Frederick Treves (1853–1923), surgeon and author, worked in the town in 1877–1879. A house in Coldwell Street is named after him.
- May Marsden (1876–1968) was an artist and teacher in Australia, and began her artistic training locally.
- Lawrence Beesley (1877–1967) was an English science teacher, journalist and author who survived the sinking of Titanic.
- D. H. Lawrence (1885–1930) lived at Mountain Cottage with his wife Frieda in 1918–1919. It stands below the B5023 road on the edge of Middleton-by-Wirksworth, about 1 1/2 miles (2.4 km) north-west of Wirksworth. Lawrence reputedly spent time also at Woodland Cottage on the far side of New Road. While in Middleton in the bitter winter of 1918–1919, he wrote the short story A Wintry Peacock
- J. G. L. Burnby (1923–2010), pharmacist who was president of the British Society for the History of Pharmacy

=== Sport ===
- Joseph Flint (1840–1912), cricketer who played for Derbyshire and played 14 First-class cricket games
- George Frost (1848–1913), cricketer who played for Derbyshire and played 37 first-class cricket matches
- George Marsden, (1869–1938), cricketer who played for Derbyshire and played 30 first-class cricket matches

== Landmarks ==
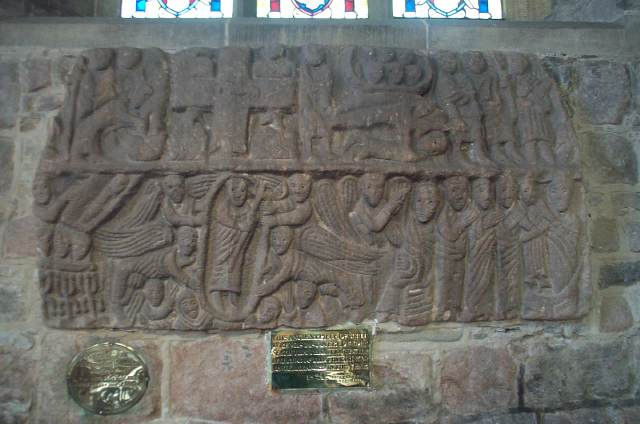
Wirksworth Stone in St Mary's Church, an early stone carving depicting scenes from the life of Christ

Wirksworth civil parish contains 108 listed buildings and structures, protected by Historic England for their historic or architectural interest. The parish church of St Mary is listed Grade I and eight structures (15 Market Place, 35 Green Hill, 1 Coldwell Street, Haarlem Mill, Wigwell Grange, the Red Lion Hotel, Gate House and the former grammar school) are Grade II*.

Wirksworth Heritage Centre illustrates the history of Wirksworth from its prehistoric Dream Cave and woolly rhinoceros, through its Roman and lead mining histories, to modern times.

The study Wirksworth and Five Miles Around, by Richard Hackett, includes census information, notes on church monuments, accounts of crimes, church wardens' accounts, maps, a transcription of "Ince's pedigrees", monument inscriptions and old photographs, parish registers and wills.

== See also ==
- Listed buildings in Wirksworth
