= Thomas Allsop =

English stockbroker and author

Thomas Allsop (10 April 1795 – 12 April 1880) was an English stockbroker and writer. Allsop is commonly described as the favourite disciple of Samuel Taylor Coleridge. He also took part in violent radical politics.

== Early life ==
He was born 10 April 1795 at Stainsborough Hall, near Wirksworth, Derbyshire, a property which belonged to his grandfather. Allsop was educated at Wirksworth grammar school. At 17 he went to London, and entered the large silk mercery establishment of his uncle, Mr. Harding, at Waterloo House, Pall Mall, where he remained some years. He then left for the Stock Exchange, prospering during the early years of railway construction.

== Social and political circle ==
Allsop's home was a favourite resort of Charles Lamb, William Hazlitt, Barry Cornwall, and others such as Thomas Noon Talfourd. Besides men like Lamb or Robert Owen, who would stay for weeks at a time, he shared the personal friendship of men as dissimilar as Cobbett, Joseph Mazzini, and the Emperor of Brazil, who, after a pilgrimage to the grave of Coleridge, sent to Allsop a silver urn inscribed with words of personal regard.

When on a grand jury about 1836, Allsop startled London by informing the commissioners at the Old Bailey that he should think it unjust 'to convict for offences having their origin in misgovernment,’ since society had made the crime. He was also anti-clerical.

When Feargus O'Connor was elected member for Nottingham, Allsop gave him his property qualification, then necessary by law, so that Chartism might be represented in parliament. On the night before 10 April 1848, the Chartist petition moment, he advised O'Connor, writing from the Bull and Mouth hotel, St. Martin's-le-Grand, London:

Nothing rashly. The government must be met with calm and firm defiance. Violence may be overcome with violence, but a resolute determination not to submit cannot be overcome.

== Orsini assassination plot ==
Allsop was seriously implicated, though he escaped punishment, in the plot of Felice Orsini, in which three bombs were thrown at Napoleon III in Paris on 14 January 1858. The casualties to bystanders included eight deaths and 150 injuries.

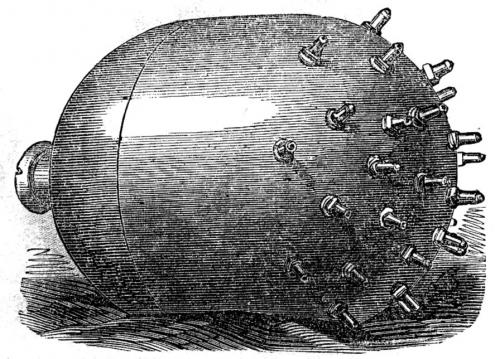
Orsini bomb, 1858, engraving published in the Illustrated London News, from a photograph of a police exhibit. The bomb was made by Joseph Taylor of Birmingham, with whom Allsop dealt.

Orsini was travelling on an old British passport issued by the Foreign Office to Allsop, at the request of a business, as Lord Palmerston explained in Parliament. Allsop managed to escape after the event to America; and stayed in New Mexico for some months, writing home to George Jacob Holyoake from Santa Fe.

Simon Francis Bernard stood trial for his own involvement. It came out that the bombs employed in the attack were ordered by Allsop in Birmingham; but that he gave his name and address. The government offered a reward of £200 for his arrest. Holyoake and John Baxter Langley then had an interview with the home secretary, and brought an offer from Allsop to give himself up if the reward was paid to them to be applied for the expenses of his defence; the reward was withdrawn. Allsop returned to England, on 17 September.

== Later life and death ==
Allsop remained active in radical causes. He served on a subcommittee set up by the International Working Men's Association in 1871 to raise money for refugees arriving from the Paris Commune. Through the body, he became a close friend of Karl Marx and Friedrich Engels. He also supported Charles Bradlaugh's Parliamentary campaigns from 1868 until 1880.

Allsop died at Exmouth in 1880, and his body was moved to Woking, so that his friend Holyoake, could speak at his grave, which could only be done on unconsecrated ground.

== Works ==
Allsop was attracted to lectures by Coleridge, and he heard those in 1818. He asked to meet the writer, and they developed a lasting friendship. On the poet's death Allsop published in two volumes his major work, Letters, Conversations, and Recollections of Samuel Taylor Coleridge (1836). He left autobiographical papers to Holyoake.

His Budget of Two Taxes only, was addressed to the then chancellor of the exchequer in 1848. His final work was California and its Gold Mines in 1852–3: he had spent two years exploring the mines. The book consists of letters addressed to his son Robert, in the style of his friend William Cobbett's letters to his son James.
