= Listed buildings in Wirksworth =

Wirksworth is a civil parish in the Derbyshire Dales district of Derbyshire, England. The parish contains 107 listed buildings that are recorded in the National Heritage List for England. Of these, one is listed at Grade I, the highest of the three grades, nine are at Grade II*, the middle grade, and the others are at Grade II, the lowest grade. The parish contains the market town of Wirksworth and the surrounding countryside. Most of the listed buildings are houses and associated structures, shops, farmhouses and farm buildings. The other listed buildings include a church and associated structures, public houses, a cotton spinning mill and associated structures, mileposts and milestones, a cemetery chapel, a railway bridge, groups of bollards, schools, a former engine house, a war memorial and a telephone kiosk.

== Key ==
Grade	Criteria
I	Buildings of exceptional interest, sometimes considered to be internationally important
II*	Particularly important buildings of more than special interest
II	Buildings of national importance and special interest

== Buildings ==
Name and location	Photograph	Date	Notes	Grade
Churchyard cross 53.08217°N 1.57272°W		13th century	The standing cross in the churchyard of St Mary's Church is in stone. It consists of a shaft without a head on an earlier small plain base.	II
St Mary's Church; 53.08198°N 1.57232°W		Late 13th century	The church has been altered and extended through the centuries, including between 1813 and 1821, in 1843–55 by H. I. Stevens, in 1870–72 by George Gilbert Scott, and between 1926 and 1930 by Sir Charles Nicholson. The church is built in stone, and has a cruciform plan, consisting of a nave with a clerestory, north and south aisles, a south porch, north and south transepts, a chancel with north and south choir aisles, and a tower at the crossing. The tower has a west clock face, a parapet in the form of a quatrefoil frieze, corner pinnacles, and a recessed lead-covered spike.	I
Gell's Bedehouses; 53.08191°N 1.57163°W		1584	A block of houses built to accommodate six men, the building is in stone with a tile roof and gabled ends. There are two storeys, the windows are mullioned and contain three casements, and there are three doorways with chamfered surrounds. On the front are an inscribed stone panel, and a bronze plate recording a restoration in 1930.	II
15 St John's Street; 53.08168°N 1.57311°W	—	Early 17th century (probable)	A cottage, later a shop, it is stuccoed, and has a slate roof with a slightly truncated gable facing the street. There are two storeys and a single bay. In the ground floor is a doorway and a shop window, and above is a two-light mullioned window.	II
Old Manor House; 53.08268°N 1.57077°W	—	Early 17th century	The house, which was altered in the 18th century, is in stone, and has roofs mainly in slate with some tile, and obelisk finials. There are two storeys and attics, and three gabled bays, the outer bays projecting. In the middle bay is a central doorway in a square-headed chamfered recess, two-light mullioned windows, and a small light in the gable. The outer bays contain sash windows in architraves, and two-light mullioned windows in the gables.	II*
The Gate House; 53.08136°N 1.57534°W	—	Early 17th century	The house, which was extended in the 18th century, is in red brick on the front and stone elsewhere, with quoins, a parapet and a hipped slate roof. There are three storeys and three bays, the middle bay slightly projecting and flanked by engraved pilasters. In the centre is a rusticated porch with a round arch, pilasters with moulded capitals, and an engraved cornice hood. The windows on the front are sashes in architraves, on the side is a stair cross window, and at the rear are mullioned windows.	II*
Babington House; 53.08371°N 1.57441°W	—	c. 1630	A stone house with quoins, two storeys and attics, a symmetrical main range, and a projecting gabled wing on the right. The windows are mullioned and contain three casements, and there are two moulded dormers, mullioned with two lights. On the right gable end is a sundial, and in the centre of the main range is a later stuccoed embattled porch. Inside, there are timber framed partitions.	II*
1–3 Green Hill; 53.08301°N 1.57394°W		1631	A house that was restored in the 1970s, and then used for other purposes. It is in stone with quoins on the right. There are two storeys and attics, and three bays, the left two bays gabled with finials. On the front are two doorways with quoined surrounds, and a cart entrance. Most of the windows are mullioned, and in the ground floor is an inserted Venetian window.	II
7 St John's Street; 53.08181°N 1.57320°W	—	17th century	A house and shop, refronted in the 19th century, in limestone and gritstone, with a front in red brick, a shallow parapet, and a tile roof with a coped east gable. There are two storeys and an attic, and two bays. On the front is a central doorway flanked by 19th-century shop fronts, the windows with four panes, above which is a plain fascia and cornice. In the upper floor and attic are imitation sash windows.	II
2–6 North End; 53.08294°N 1.57169°W	—	Late 17th century	A row of three stone houses with moulded eaves and a tile roof. There are three storeys and each house has a single bay. The three doorways have plain surrounds, and to the left is a passage doorway. The windows vary, and include sashes, casements and a former shop window, all with small panes.	II
Holehouse Farmhouse; 53.06615°N 1.56368°W		Late 17th century	The farmhouse, which was later extended, is in stone, and has a roof of slate and tile, and a coped gable. There are two storeys and an irregular plan. The doorway has a chamfered surround, there is a two-light mullioned window, and the other windows are casements.	II
Royal Oak Inn; 53.08309°N 1.57141°W		Late 17th century	The public house is in stone with corbelled eaves and a tile roof. There are three storeys and three bays. The main doorway is recessed and has a small cornice hood, and there is a smaller doorway to the left. The windows are sashes.	II
15 Coldwell Street; 53.08298°N 1.57232°W		Late 17th to early 18th century	The house is in stone with a tile roof. There are two storeys and two bays. On the right is a doorway with a rusticated surround and a small hood on consoles. One of the windows is mullioned with three lights, and the others are replacements.	II
32 St John's Street; 53.08039°N 1.57351°W		Late 17th to early 18th century	A stuccoed house with quoins, and a tile roof with stone coped gables and kneelers. There are three storeys and three bays. The doorway has a quoined surround, and the windows are mullioned and contain three casements.	II
Home Farmhouse; 53.08737°N 1.54489°W	—	Late 17th to early 18th century	A stone farmhouse with a tile roof and three storeys. The doorway has a plain surround, and the windows are small-paned, either with a single light, or mullioned with two lights.	II
37 St John's Street; 53.08116°N 1.57297°W	—	1719	A stone shop with a hipped tile roof, two storeys, and one bay facing the street. On the front is a doorway and a 19th-century shop front, with a sash window above. In the right return are windows, and a doorway with a plain surround, a dated lintel, and a hood on consoles.	II
Gate piers and gates, St Mary's churchyard 53.08207°N 1.57329°W	—	1721	The gate piers flanking the entrance to the passageway leading to St John's Road are in stone, with panelled sides, and moulded cornice caps with moulded finials. On the left pier is an inscription, and between the piers are wrought iron gates.	II
17 St John's Street; 53.08164°N 1.57310°W	—	Early 18th century (probable)	A stone house with a tile roof, two storeys and an attic, and one bay. In the ground floor is a doorway and a bay window, the upper floor contains a sash window, and in the attic is a two-light mullioned window.	II
40 and 42 St John's Street; 53.08014°N 1.57361°W	—	Early 18th century	A stone house with quoins, moulded eaves, and a tile roof with coped gables and kneelers. There are three storeys and three bays. On the front are two semicircular-headed doorways with moulded architraves, and fanlights with Gothic glazing bars. The windows either have a single light, or are mullioned with three lights, containing casements, with some lights blocked.	II
Former George Inn; 53.08265°N 1.57183°W		Early 18th century (probable)	A former public house on a corner site, later a private house, most of its fabric dates from the 19th century. It is stuccoed, and has moulded plaster eaves and a tile roof, hipped on the corner. There are three storeys and a front of two bays. The doorway has a plain surround, and the windows are sashes.	II
4 and 5 Market Place; 53.08237°N 1.57409°W		1747	A house and a shop, at one time a public house, they are stuccoed, with a stone parapet. There are three storeys and three bays. In the left bay is a round-headed archway. To its right is a canted bay window, a doorway with a moulded surround and a keystone, and a shop front. The upper floors contain sash windows; the window over the archway is tripartite.	II
1–3 Blind Lane; 53.08235°N 1.57110°W	—	Mid 18th century	A large red brick house on a corner site with three storeys and a tile roof. The front facing Coldwell Street has a stone plinth, sill bands, coved eaves, and three bays, the middle bay slightly projecting. In the centre, steps with cast iron railings lead up to a doorway with a moulded stone architrave, a rectangular fanlight, and a pediment on consoles, and the windows are sashes. The Blind Lane front has four bays, and three doorways, two in chamfered recesses. The upper floors contain two-light mullioned windows, and in the ground floor are three Venetian windows.	II
15 Market Place; 53.08285°N 1.57383°W		Mid 18th century	The main part of the house is in stone with quoins, a moulded cornice and a parapet. There are three storeys and five bays. Steps with railings lead to the central doorway that has a moulded surround, pilasters and a pediment. The windows are sashes in moulded architraves. To the left is a later wing with two storeys and a single bay. It is in red brick with stone dressings, floor bands, flanking giant pilasters, a moulded eaves cornice and an open pediment. It contains a decorative Venetian window in each floor. At the rear is a mullioned stair window.	II*
28 Market Place; 53.08215°N 1.57355°W	—	18th century	A shop in red brick with dentilled eaves and a tile roof. There are three storeys and an attic, one bay facing the street, and two in the right return. Facing the street is a 19th-century shop front, over which is a sash window and a blind window. The right return contains a modern shop front, a doorway and sash windows.	II
Adam Bede's Cottage; 53.06982°N 1.57711°W	—	18th century	A stone cottage with a slate roof, two storeys and two bays. On the front is a gabled porch, and the windows are mullioned.	II
Wall, gate piers and gates, Old Manor House; 53.08253°N 1.57078°W	—	18th century	The gate piers flanking the entrance are in stone, they are columnar, and have square bases and cushion caps. Between them are wrought iron gates, and outside are stone walls with rounded copings.	II
The Red Lion Hotel; 53.08284°N 1.57344°W		Mid18th century	A coaching inn that has been altered and extended, it is mainly in painted brick on a plinth, with some limestone, and with gritstone dressings, sill bands, a moulded cornice, a parapet, and a roof of tiles and limestone slates. There are three storeys and a main front of three bays, the middle bay projecting under a pediment. In the centre is a round-arched carriageway, above which is a Venetian window, and a Diocletian window. The outer bays contain sash windows with wedge lintels.	II*
22 Wash Green, cottage and stable 53.08246°N 1.56693°W		1758	Originally the Ship Inn, later a private house, it is in brick, the front rendered and incised to resemble stone, with quoins, and a tile roof with coped gables and moulded kneelers. There are three storeys and two bays. The central doorway has a flat hood, and the windows are mullioned with two casements. Attached to the right is a former cottage and stable with overloft in gritstone, the front rendered as the house, with two storeys, and a Welsh slate roof. This part contains a doorway and two-light mullioned windows, and to the right is a stable entrance with a modern window above.	II
Former Miners' Standard pub 53.09221°N 1.56463°W		Mid to late 18th century	The building, at one time a public house, has been converted into two houses. It is in gritstone and limestone, with some red brick, and has a roof of Staffordshire blue tile. There are two storeys and an L-shaped plan, the main range has five bays, and there are lean-to extensions. The windows are a mix of sash and casement windows.	II
1 Coldwell Street; 53.08286°N 1.57317°W	—	Late 18th century	A house in red brick with false quoins on the right, a moulded stone cornice, and a parapet. There are three storeys and three bays. The central doorway has an architrave and a keystone, and the windows are sashes. In front of the house is a low wall with railings, which also flank the steps up to the doorway.	II*
12 and 14 Coldwell Street; 53.08254°N 1.57123°W	—	Late 18th century	A pair of houses in red brick on a stone plinth, with quoins on the left, floor bands, moulded eaves, and a tile roof with stone coped gables. The doorways have moulded surrounds with pilasters and dentilled cornice hoods on consoles, and the windows are sashes.	II
10 Market Place; 53.08260°N 1.57388°W		Late 18th century	A stuccoed shop with moulded stone eaves and a tile roof. There are two storeys and three bays. In the right bay are two round-headed doorways with fanlights containing Gothic glazing. To the left is a shop front with a recessed doorway, and further to the left is a doorway with a plain surround. The upper floor contains sash windows in moulded architraves.	II
12 Market Place; 53.08278°N 1.57399°W		Late 18th century	A pair of shops in stone with a slate roof and a coped half-gable on the right. There are three storeys and two bays. In the ground floor are 19th-century shop fronts with moulded cornices, and to the left is a passage entry. Above are sash windows, the window in the left bay of the middle floor is tripartite, with moulded pilasters, a frieze and a cornice.	II
19 Market Place; 53.08255°N 1.57344°W	—	Late 18th century (probable)	A shop in stone with a floor band, a moulded eaves cornice and a slate roof. There are three storeys and two bays. In the ground floor is a modern shop front, retaining the earlier cornice and pilasters, and the upper floors contain sash windows.	II
21 and 22 Market Place; 53.08243°N 1.57349°W	—	Late 18th century	A pair of shops in red brick with stone dressings, moulded stone eaves, a blocking course and a slate roof. There are three storeys and three bays. In the ground floor are modern shop fronts retaining earlier cornices, and the upper floors contain sash windows.	II
24 Market Place; 53.08228°N 1.57358°W	—	Late 18th century	A shop in painted brick with a slate roof, three storeys and three bays. In the ground floor is a shop front with bow windows, and the upper floors contain sash windows, the middle window in the top floor blind. At the rear is a doorway flanked by iron railings with a moulded architrave and a cornice, and sash windows with channelled lintels and keystones.	II
8 North End; 53.08299°N 1.57161°W	—	Late 18th century (probable)	A red brick house on a stone plinth, with stone dressings, moulded stone eaves and a tile roof. There are three storeys and a single bay. The doorway on the right has a plain surround, and the windows are sashes.	II
16 and 18 North End; 53.08318°N 1.57132°W	—	Late 18th century	A pair of stuccoed houses with a tile roof. There are two storeys and two bays. The coupled doorways in the centre have wooden pilasters and cornice hoods. The windows in No. 16 are sashes, and in No. 18 they are replacements.	II
47–50 Wash Green; 53.08314°N 1.56413°W	—	Late 18th century	A row of four stone cottages with coved eaves, and a tile roof with coped gables. There are two storeys and four bays. The semicircular-headed doorways have rusticated surrounds and small side windows. The other windows have semicircular rusticated surrounds, and there is one casement window.	II
1 West End; 53.08191°N 1.57444°W		Late 18th century	A red brick house with a sill band, moulded plaster eaves and a slate roof. There are three storeys and three bays. The central doorway has a moulded stuccoed architrave, a rectangular fanlight, and a small cornice hood, and the windows are sashes. In front of the forecourt is a low wall with railings.	II
Churchyard wall and railings 53.08187°N 1.56176°W	—	Late 18th century	The churchyard of St Mary's Church is enclosed by a low stone wall with saddleback coping, surmounted by wrought iron railings.	II
Dale House; 53.08285°N 1.57412°W		Late 18th century	Shops with residential accommodation above in red brick, with stone dressings, a sill band, and moulded eaves. There are three storeys and three bays, the middle bay projecting slightly under a pediment. In the centre is a round-arched stuccoed doorway flanked by pilasters with moulded caps, over which is a moulded cornice with a triglyph frieze, and a pediment. The doorway is flanked by modern shop fronts, and the upper floor windows are modern, those in the middle bay with moulded architraves and cornices.	II
Hardhurst Farm; 53.07290°N 1.55782°W		Late 18th century	The farmhouse and attached flanking outbuildings are in gritstone, with tile roofs,coped gables and block kneelers. The house has two storeys and attics and four irregular bays. There are two doorways, each with a quoined surround, a deep chamfered lintel and a bracketed flat canopy, one with a porch. Above the left doorway is a transomed stair window, and the other windows are mullioned. In front of the house is a low enclosure wall with gate piers and a feeding trough. On each side are outbuildings, each with a flight of external stone steps.	II
The Old Coachhouse and wall 53.08301°N 1.57451°W	—	Late 18th century	A house, later a coach house, in red brick and rendered gritstone on a plinth, with stone dressings, a moulded eaves cornice on the east, a dentilled eaves band on the north and south, and a hipped tile roof. There are two storeys and three bays, the middle bay projecting under a pediment. In the centre is a round-arched doorway with imposts and a double keystone. The left bay contains a doorway, in the right bay are garage doors, and the windows are sashes. Attached is a boundary wall with stone coping, and a curved link with a pier.	II
Haarlem Mill; 53.07002°N 1.57793°W		1777–80	A cotton spinning mill built by Richard Arkwright, the ground floor is in stone, above it is in red brick, and the roof is slated. There are four storeys, a rectangular plan, and fronts of seven and three bays. The dressings are in stone, and there are sill bands. The main entrance is in the centre, and above it is a blocked taking-in door with "HAARLEM" painted below.	II*
33 and 35 Coldwell Street; 53.08275°N 1.57145°W	—	c. 1800	A pair of houses in rendered red brick with painted stone dressings and a slate roof. There are three storeys and three bays. On the front are two doorways, and the windows are sashes.	II
Durham House and shop 53.08443°N 1.57118°W		c. 1800	The house and former shop are in red brick on a stone plinth, with stone dressings and hipped slate roofs. The house has three storeys and three bays, and the former shop to the left has two storeys and a single bay. The house has a central doorway with pilasters and a flat hood, and the windows are sashes. The former shop has a doorway with a small shop window to the right and a casement window above.	II
Former Compleat Angler Inn; 53.08286°N 1.57302°W		c. 1800	The former public house, later used for other purposes, is in painted brick with a slate roof, and has been much altered. There are three storeys, two bays on the front, and three gabled bays on the right return. On the front is a shop front with a central doorway flanked by bow windows. To the right is a single-storey extension with a bowed end, a cornice and ball finials. The windows are sashes, and on the right return is a doorway with a moulded surround, a rectangular fanlight, and a pediment on consoles.	II
Vicarage; 53.08256°N 1.57266°W	—	c. 1800	The vicarage is in stone with a floor band and a hipped slate roof. There are three storeys, three bays, and a two-storey two-bay wing on the left. The doorway is recessed, with a segmental-arched head and side lights, and the windows are sashes.	II
Outbuilding northwest of the Vicarage; 53.08269°N 1.57283°W	—	c. 1800	The outbuilding is in stone, and has plain eaves and a roof of old stone tiles. There are two storeys and two bays. It contains a central doorway with a coach entrance to the left, a square opening in the upper floor, and windows with Gothic glazing.	II
Vicarage garden wall and gate piers 53.08273°N 1.57239°W	—	c. 1800	The gate piers flanking the entrance to the garden are in stone and have pyramidal caps. The flanking garden walls have rounded coping.	II
6 Coldwell Street; 53.08264°N 1.57207°W	—	Late 18th to early 19th century	A stone house with corbelled eaves and a slate roof. There are three storeys and two bays. The doorway has a stuccoed surround and a square fanlight, and the windows are sashes.	II
6 Market Place; 53.08238°N 1.57390°W		Late 18th to early 19th century	A shop on a corner site, it is stuccoed, and has a tile roof with a coped gable. There are two storeys and attics, the entrance front is gabled with one bay, and on the left return are two bays. In the centre, steps with railings lead up to a doorway that is flanked by shop bay windows. The return contains two bay windows and a doorway, and the other windows are sashes in moulded architraves.	II
20 Market Place; 53.08249°N 1.57347°W	—	Late 18th to early 19th century	A shop in engraved stucco with floor bands, moulded stuccoed eaves and a slate roof. There are four storeys and two bays. In the ground floor is a 19th-century shop front, bowed at the sides, and the upper floors contain sash windows in moulded architraves.	II
8 St John's Street; 53.08136°N 1.57335°W	—	Late 18th to early 19th century	A red brick building on a corner site, with stone dressings, dentilled eaves and a tile roof. There are three storeys and three bays, the right bay curved on the corner. On the front are two doorways, and the windows are sashes.	II
57 and 59 St John's Street; 53.08011°N 1.57335°W	—	Late 18th to early 19th century	A stone house on a plinth with a roof of slate and tile. There are three storeys and two bays. On the front are two doorways, one blocked, flanked by later replacement windows, and in the upper floors are two-light mullioned windows.	II
Lime Kiln Inn; 53.08544°N 1.57258°W		Late 18th to early 19th century	The public house is in stone with quoins, coved eaves and a tile roof. There are three storeys and three bays. The central doorway has a plain surround, the windows above it are blocked, and the others are sashes.	II
Milepost, Wicksworth Road; 53.07830°N 1.54731°W		Late 18th to early 19th century	The milepost on the east side of Wirksworth Road consists of a gritstone pillar with a square section, about 1 metre (3 ft 3 in) high. It is inscribed with the name of the parish, pointing gloved hands, and the distances to London and Derby.	II
Baptist Cemetery Chapel; 53.08485°N 1.57123°W	—	c. 1812	The former chapel is in gritstone on the front and limestone elsewhere, with a wide eaves course, and a hipped slate roof. There is a single storey and a rectangular plan. The doorway and windows have pointed arches.	II
Moot Hall; 53.08406°N 1.57203°W		1814	The court house is in stone, and has moulded eaves, a single storey, and a symmetrical front of three bays. Steps lead up to a central recessed doorway that is flanked by sash windows. Also on the front are re-used carved plaques in Hopton Wood Stone, the plaque over the doorway with an armorial device, and the side plaques carved with mining emblems, scales, a pick and a trough.	II
Wigwell Grange; 53.08583°N 1.54407°W		c. 1816	A stone house that was extended in 1902, it has a hipped roof and a parapet with ball-head finials. There are two storeys and five bays, and a low wing possibly incorporating remain from an earlier house. The porch has paired Doric pilasters, a cornice, and a balustrade with ball-head finials. The windows are sashes, and on the right return is a bow window.	II*
Pittywood Farmhouse and barn 53.07313°N 1.58582°W	—	c. 1820	The farmhouse and attached barn are in sandstone with a tile roof and two storeys. The house has three bays, a central porch with a small stair light above, and the windows are casements in cast iron frames with decorative lintels. The barn contains two windows, one a sash.	II
Railway bridge 53.09316°N 1.58570°W	—	c. 1825	The bridge was built by the Cromford and High Peak Railway to carry its line over a road, and is a simple beam bridge with a single span. The abutments are in stone, the superstructure is in wood, and is supported by three cast iron beams.	II
11 Market Place; 53.08270°N 1.57392°W		Early 19th century	A stone shop with a sill band, moulded eaves, a blocking course, and a slate roof. There are three storeys and three bays, the left bay canted. In the ground floor are 19th-century shop fronts with pilasters, and cornices on consoles. In the left bay are sash windows in the upper floors, the window in the middle bay tripartite. The right two bays contain sash windows in the middle floor, and a Diocletian window in the top floor.	II
23 Market Place; 53.08235°N 1.57355°W		Early 19th century	A shop in red brick with stone dressings and a slate roof. There are three storeys and three bays. In the ground floor is a modern shop front, and the upper floors contain sash windows with channelled wedge lintels.	II
25 Market Place; 53.08223°N 1.57357°W	—	Early 19th century	A shop in painted brick with an earlier timber framed core, and a gable facing the street. There are two storeys and an attic, and two bays. In the ground floor is a modern shop front, and above are sash windows. The rear contains a three-light mullioned window.	II
10 and 12 North End; 53.08304°N 1.57155°W	—	Early 19th century	A pair of houses in red brick on a stone plinth with stone dressings. There are three storeys and three bays. In the left bay is a square-headed entry, the two doorways have plain surrounds, and the windows are sashes.	II
5 St Mary's Gate; 53.08149°N 1.57270°W	—	Early 19th century	A shop with a stuccoed exterior on an earlier timber framed core, the gable end facing the street. There are two storeys and an attic, and a single bay. In the ground floor is a 19th-century shop front including a recessed doorway with an architrave, and above are mullioned windows with casements.	II
10, 12 and 14 St John's Street; 53.08122°N 1.57334°W	—	Early 19th century	A row of three houses, No. 10 previously an inn (Tiger Inn), in stone with a tile roof. There are three storeys and four bays. The doorway of No. 10 has a round-arched head, a rusticated surround, and a fanlight with Gothic glazing bars, and the other doorways have flat heads and plain surrounds. Some windows are sashes and others are replacements.	II
31 St John's Street; 53.08135°N 1.57295°W	—	Early 19th century	A shop with a stuccoed exterior over an earlier timber framed core, the gable end facing the street. There are two storeys and a single bay. In the ground floor is a doorway and a bow window, the upper floor contains an inserted window, and in the left return are mullioned windows with three and four lights.	II
34 and 36 St John's Street; 53.08029°N 1.57357°W		Early 19th century	A pair of red brick houses on a stone plinth, with stone dressings, dentilled eaves and a tile roof. There are three storeys and three bays. In the right bay is a segmental-arched entrance, and to the left are two doorways. The doorways and the windows, which are sashes, have wedge lintels.	II
35 St John's Street; 53.08121°N 1.57293°W	—	Early 19th century	A stuccoed shop with a tile roof, two storeys and two bays. In the ground floor is a 19th-century shop front, a bow window and a doorway, and the upper floor contains two casement windows.	II
38 St John's Street; 53.08023°N 1.57356°W	—	Early 19th century	The house, possibly on an earlier core, is in red brick with stone dressings, corbelled eaves, and a slate roof with a coped gable on the left. There are two storeys and two bays, and the windows are sashes.	II
42 Wash Green; 53.08303°N 1.56523°W	—	Early 19th century	A red brick house with a slate roof, two storeys, three bays, and a small recessed bay on the left. The central doorway has pilasters and a cornice with false castellation, above which is a blind window. The other windows are small-paned with Gothic glazing bars, those in the ground floor with cornice hoods on small consoles.	II
Former Black's Head Inn; 53.08224°N 1.57449°W		Early 19th century	The public house is in red brick with a tile roof. There are two storeys and attics, and two bays. The doorway in the left bay has a moulded surround with pilasters and a cornice hood, and the windows are sashes with channelled lintels and keystones.	II
Bollards off Market Place; 53.08236°N 1.57338°W	—	Early 19th century	The group of four bollards is at the east end of passageway between Nos. 22 and 23 Market Place. They are in cast iron, cylindrical and tapered, and have cushion caps.	II
Bollards west of St Mary's Church; 53.08207°N 1.57329°W	—	Early 19th century	The two bollards to the right of the gate piers at the entry to the churchyard are in cast iron. They are cylindrical and tapered, and have cushion caps.	II
Bollards, St Mary's Gate; 53.08175°N 1.57234°W	—	Early 19th century	The group of four bollards is at the north end of St Mary's Gate. They are in cast iron, cylindrical and tapered, and have cushion caps.	II
Bollards south of Gell's Bedehouses; 53.08179°N 1.57172°W	—	Early 19th century	The group of four bollards is to the south of Gell's Bedehouses. They are in cast iron, cylindrical and tapered, and have cushion caps.	II
Bollards, Church Street; 53.08226°N 1.57208°W	—	Early 19th century	The group of eight bollards is at the south end of Church Street. They are in cast iron, cylindrical and tapered, and have cushion caps.	II
Hope and Anchor Hotel; 53.08206°N 1.57371°W		Early 19th century	The hotel, which incorporates 17th-century features, is in stone on a plinth, and has three storeys and seven bays. On the front is a stuccoed portico with Tuscan columns, and the windows are sashes. At the rear are gabled dormers, and on the front is a 19th-century cast iron inn sign.	II
Former Lloyd's Bank; 53.08165°N 1.57342°W		Early 19th century	The former bank, on a corner site, is stuccoed, with sill bands, moulded eaves and a roof of tile and slate The main block has three storeys, four bays on The Causeway, a splayed bay on the corner and two bays on St John's Street, beyond which is a wing with two storeys and one bay. The doorway in the corner bay has a segmental head, a moulded architrave and a fanlight, and above it are blind windows. The other windows are sashes.	II
Former Maternity Home; 53.08107°N 1.57339°W	—	Early 19th century	The maternity home, later used for other purposes, is in stone, with quoins, sill bands, a modillion eaves cornice, a blocking course, and coped gables. There are three storeys and three bays, flanked by two-storey wings. In the centre is a portico with paired Tuscan pillars, an entablature, and a cornice, and a doorway with a moulded surround and a rectangular fanlight. The windows are sashes, those in the ground floor with moulded architraves, and pediments on consoles.	II
Milepost 1 mile south of Wirksworth; 53.06594°N 1.57400°W		Early 19th century	The milepost is on the west side of Derby Road (B5023 road). It is in cast iron, and has a triangular plan and a plate with a rounded top. On the top plate is the name of the parish and the distance to London, and on the sides are the distances to Wirksworth and Derby.	II
Milepost, Town Hall; 53.08271°N 1.57333°W		Early 19th century	The milepost is on the northwest angle of the Town Hall. It is in cast iron, and has a triangular plan and a plate with a rounded top. On the top plate is the distance to London, and on the sides are the distances to Duffield, Derby, Newhaven, Buxton and Manchester.	II
Milestone 1 mile east of Wirksworth; 53.08571°N 1.54975°W		Early 19th century	The milestone is on the northwest side of the B5035 road. It consists of a stone with splayed sides inscribed with the distances to Alfreton, Ashbourne and Wirksworth.	II
Milestone 2 miles east of Wirksworth; 53.09219°N 1.53078°W		Early 19th century	The milestone is on the north side of the B5035 road. It consists of a stone with splayed sides inscribed with the distances to Alfreton, Ashbourne and Wirksworth.	II
Gate piers, The Gatehouse; 53.08147°N 1.57420°W	—	Early 19th century	The gate piers flanking the entrance to the drive are in rusticated stone. Each pier has a moulded cornice cap and a ball-head finial.	II
Former Grammar School; 53.08220°N 1.57175°W		1828	The former grammar school is in stone with two storeys and four bays, and in Tudor Gothic style. Between the floors is a band of diamond decoration, at the top is a decorated cornice, and an embattled parapet with crocketed finials. The doorway in the left bay has a chamfered surround and a square hood mould, and above it is a festooned plaque. The windows are casements with Gothic glazing and square hood moulds.	II*
13 West End; 53.08196°N 1.57464°W	—	1830	A red brick house with moulded stone eaves and a slate roof. There are two storeys and an attic, and a single bay. The doorway to the right has a moulded stone surround, the windows are sashes, and there is a dated rainwater head. In front of the forecourt is a low wall with railings.	II
Moor Cottage Farm; 53.08538°N 1.55281°W	—	c. 1830	A private house, later a farmhouse, in cottage orné style, it is in red brick with a tile roof and two storeys. Originally with a cruciform plan, the north angle was later infilled. The south front has three bays, the middle bay projecting and gabled. The windows have pointed heads, iron frames and small panes. To the right are altered French windows in a trellised verandah.	II
14, 15 and 15A The Causeway; 53.08167°N 1.57375°W	—	Early to mid 19th century	Three houses in gritstone, partly rendered, with slate roofs. They are in two and three storeys, and have a curved end. The main doorway has pilasters, a rectangular fanlight, and a small hood, and the windows are sashes.	II
12 The Causeway; 53.08152°N 1.57440°W	—	1837	A stone house with a moulded floor band, and a tile roof with coped gables. There are two storeys and three bays. The doorway and the windows, which are mullioned, have chamfered surrounds, and the windows have Gothic cast iron glazing bars.	II
6 St John's Street; 53.08149°N 1.57338°W		1843	The building, at one time a bank, is in stone, the ground floor rusticated, with quoins, floor and sill bands, a modillion cornice, and a blocking course. There are two storeys and three bays. In the right bay is a recessed doorway with coupled pilasters, an entablature, a rectangular fanlight, and a cornice hood. The windows are sashes, in the ground floor they have round-arched heads, and those in the upper floor have flat heads with cornice hoods on brackets. To the right is an arcade with three arches, the middle arch the largest, and the left arch blocked.	II
7 and 8 Market Place; 53.08248°N 1.57389°W		19th century	A pair of red brick shops on an earlier core with a tile roof. There are thee storeys and four bays. In the ground floor are 19th-century shop fronts, and in the third bay is a later bow window. Over the left three bays is a cornice with iron brattishing. The upper floors contain sash windows.	II
9 Market Place; 53.08254°N 1.57386°W		19th century	A shop, possibly with an earlier core, in red brick with moulded stone eaves, a blocking course and a tile roof. There are thee storeys and two bays. In the ground floor is a 19th-century shop front, the upper floors contain sash windows, and in the roof are two gabled dormers with spike finials.	II
Bracket lamp, 14 The Causeway; 53.08172°N 1.57381°W	—	19th century	The lamp, which is attached to the wall of a house, is in cast iron. It consists of a scrolled bracket and a six-sided lantern.	II
Railings, gates and gatepiers, Baptist Cemetery; 53.08472°N 1.57152°W	—	Mid 19th century	The gate piers flanking the entrance to the cemetery are square, in gritstone, and have moulded pyramidal caps and ball finials, and between them are gates. Flanking the piers are low curved walls with chamfered copings and railings, ending in smaller piers.	II
Warehouse, Haarlem Mill; 53.06982°N 1.57812°W		Mid 19th century	The warehouse, which was later extended, is stone and red brick with a slate roof. The main front has three storeys and 17 bays, it is faced with red brick, and has a plinth of stone and blue brick. There is a rectangular plan with a small two-storey block on the west side. The windows have segmental heads and small panes.	II
Meerbrook Sough Engine House; 53.08759°N 1.57088°W	—	Mid 19th century	The former engine house is in limestone with quoins and a tile roof. There are two storeys and a single bay. It contains various openings, some with round-arched heads, and a doorway with an arched head. External steps lead up to a first floor west doorway.	II
Infants School, railings and wall 53.08528°N 1.57182°W	—	1851–52	The school, designed by H. I. Stevens in Tudor style, is in sandstone, and has tile roofs with coped gables, kneelers and finials. There is a single storey and an attic, and three main gabled ranges with a projecting porch. Most of the windows are mullioned and transomed. Attached to the school is a stone boundary wall with triangular coping, railings, and two pairs of gate piers.	II
Sunday School; 53.08311°N 1.57243°W	—	1857	The Sunday school is in red brick on a plinth, with stone dressings, sill bands, corbelled eaves and a tile roof. There are three storeys and two bays. The central doorway, which has a fanlight, and the windows, which contain Gothic glazing bars, have semicircular heads, rusticated surrounds, and keystones.	II
Haarlem House; 53.06988°N 1.57770°W		c. 1858	Originally a manager's house in the grounds of Haarlem Mill, it is in stone with a Welsh slate roof. There are two storeys and three bays. The central doorway has a small hood on console brackets. The windows at the front are sashes, and at the rear they are casements.	II
Former Westminster Bank; 53.08228°N 1.57359°W	—	c. 1910	The former bank is in stone on a plinth, the ground floor rusticated, with a moulded cornice over the ground floor, a modillion eaves cornice, and an open balustrade. There are three storeys and an attic, and four bays. The doorway and ground floor windows have fanlights, in the upper floors are sash windows with moulded architraves, pulvinated friezes and cornice hoods, and in the attic are two gabled dormers.	II
Junior School; 53.08269°N 1.56770°W	—	19112	The school, designed by George H. Widdows in Arts and Crafts style, is in red brick, partly rendered, with tile dressings and roofs. There is a butterfly plan, consisting of a central octagonal hall and four radiating wings, each ending in a cross-wing. Most of the school has a single storey and attics, with hipped dormers in the attics.	II
Bolehill and Steeple Grange War Memorial; 53.09227°N 1.56937°W		1925	The war memorial consists of an alcove shelter built in concrete blocks. It has an arch with a pointed roof flanked by pilasters that have capitals with wreaths and dates, and above the arch is an inscription. Inside the alcove are three white Italian marble plaques, one with an inscription, and the others with the names of those lost in the two World Wars. Inside the shelter is a metal bench.	II
Telephone kiosk 53.08264°N 1.57337°W		1935	The K6 type telephone kiosk in Market Place was designed by Giles Gilbert Scott. Constructed in cast iron with a square plan and a dome, it has three unperforated crowns in the top panels.	II
