= Kirk Ireton =

Village in Derbyshire, England

Coordinates: 53.055°N 1.603°W

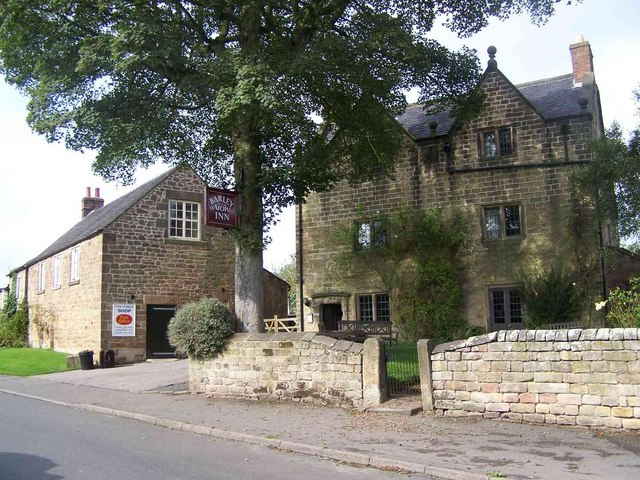
- The Barley Mow pub and community-run village shop

- Location within Derbyshire
- Population: 518 (2011)
- OS grid reference: SK267509
- District: Derbyshire Dales
- Shire county: Derbyshire
- Region: East Midlands
- Country: England
- Sovereign state: United Kingdom
- Post town: ASHBOURNE
- Postcode district: DE6
- Dialling code: 01335
- Police: Derbyshire
- Fire: Derbyshire
- Ambulance: East Midlands
- UK Parliament: Derbyshire Dales

Kirk Ireton is a village and civil parish in Derbyshire, England, 4 miles (6.4 km) southwest of Wirksworth on a hillside near Carsington Water, 700 feet (210 m) above sea level. The population at the 2011 Census was 518. Ireton is a corruption of the Saxon hyre-tun, meaning "Irishman's enclosure"; Kirk was added after the Norman invasion and the building of the church. The village dates back to at least the Bronze Age.

Kirk Ireton remains what it has always been, an agricultural village. Following the Second World War the number of working farms dropped from over thirty to half a dozen in the space of 40 years. The last cow was turned down Main Street in the late 1980s, but Fords, Matkins, Rowlands, Walkers and Wards still farm locally as they have done for many generations. Many of the former farm buildings have been adapted into houses. Much of the older part of the village dates back to the 17th century and is mostly built from sandstone, quarried locally.

One of the oldest buildings in the village is the Barley Mow pub, which was one of the last premises in the country to accept decimalization, as the 87-year-old landlady, Lillian Ford, did not hold with the new money. The parish previously housed at least four other public houses: The Wheatsheaf, Old Bull's Head, The Windmill and The Gate.

Holy Trinity Church is Norman, with the earliest parts being the three-bayed south and north arcades. The tower and the chancel are Perpendicular. It has an interesting custom known as roping for weddings, when the village children put a rope across the road and the bride and groom are not allowed to leave the church until a toll has been paid in silver by the groom.

The village still celebrates a Wakes week, which starts on Trinity Sunday, the church's patronal festival. A procession of villagers is led by a local brass band, from the Barley Mow pub to the church for thanksgiving. Various events take place during the week, with a major all-day event on Saturday.

The Post Office closed in 2008, before re-opening as a community shop. The premises were originally stables and the restored hay racks are still in place above shelving along one wall.

== Notable residents ==
- Anthony Blackwall – scholar was born here.
- George Turner (1841–1910), landscape artist, lived at the Barley Mow Inn from 1900 to his death in 1910.

== See also ==
- Listed buildings in Kirk Ireton
