= Listed buildings in Kirk Ireton =

Kirk Ireton is a civil parish in the Derbyshire Dales district of Derbyshire, England. The parish contains 27 listed buildings that are recorded in the National Heritage List for England. Of these, one is listed at Grade I, the highest of the three grades, one is at Grade II*, the middle grade, and the others are at Grade II, the lowest grade. The parish contains the village of Kirk Ireton and the surrounding countryside. Most of the listed buildings are houses, cottages and associated structures, farmhouses and farm buildings, and the others are churches and associated structures, and a public house.

== Key ==
Grade	Criteria
I	Buildings of exceptional interest, sometimes considered to be internationally important
II*	Particularly important buildings of more than special interest
II	Buildings of national importance and special interest

== Buildings ==
Name and location	Photograph	Date	Notes	Grade
Holy Trinity Church; 53.04853°N 1.60020°W		12th century	The church has been altered and extended during the centuries, and was restored in 1873. It is built in gritstone, and consists of a nave with a clerestory, north and south aisles, a south porch, a chancel with chapels and a vestry, and a west tower. The tower has two stages, a south lancet window, two-light bell openings, and an embattled parapet. The south doorway is Norman, and set within the arch is an Early English doorway. The chancel and chapels have embattled parapets.	I
The Barley Mow Inn; 53.04786°N 1.60419°W		1580s	The oldest part of the public house is the rear wing, the main block being added in 1683. The building is in gritstone, and has tile roofs with coped gables and kneelers. The rear wing has two storeys, and contains a doorway with a quoined surround and mullioned windows. The main range has three storeys, and a gabled front of two bays. The doorway has a cambered head and hood mould, and the windows are mullioned, containing casements, and with hood moulds.	II*
Church Farmhouse; 53.04864°N 1.59975°W		1618	The farmhouse is in gritstone on a chamfered plinth, and has a tile roof with coped gables. There are two storeys and is double-fronted at the south. The windows have chamfered moulded surrounds and are mullioned, some of them small. In the centre is a doorway with a wood surround.	II
Blackwall House; 53.04126°N 1.61819°W		Early 17th century	The house, which was refashioned in 1736 and later, is in gritstone, and has tile roofs with coped gables and kneelers. There are two storeys and attics and an irregular plan, basically a square with east and west wings. The south front has three gables, the middle gable shaped. In front of it are steps with a balustrade, and a gabled porch with a round-arched opening and a keystone. On this front are four Venetian windows, and between the upper floor windows and in the gables are round-headed windows. On the east and north fronts are mullioned windows.	II
Buxton Hall Farmhouse; 53.04821°N 1.60309°W		Early 17th century	The farmhouse, which was later altered, is in gritstone, and has a tile roof with coped gables and kneelers. There are two storeys and a front with irregular fenestration. Most of the windows are mullioned or mullioned and transomed, and inside, there is a cruck truss.	II
Rose Bank; 53.04781°N 1.60125°W		Early 17th century	The house, which was extended by two bays in the 19th century, is in gritstone with the remains of a plinth, quoins, and a coped gable with kneelers at the west end. The earlier windows are mullioned, some with hood moulds, and the later windows are casements.	II,
Stables northwest of Blackwall House; 53.04148°N 1.61862°W	—	1633	The stables are in gritstone, and have a tile roof with coped gables and kneelers. There are two storeys and two bays. There are two doorways with quoined surrounds, one with a dated lintel. The windows are mullioned, and on the gable end facing the road is a sundial.	II,
Blackwall Farmhouse; 53.04112°N 1.61664°W	—	Early to mid 17th century	The farmhouse is in gritstone on a chamfered plinth, and it has a blue tile roof. There are two storeys and attics, a front of three bays, a recessed lower single-storey single-bay wing on the left, and a lean-to at the rear. The main doorway has a moulded quoined surround, and a massive initialled lintel. The windows on the front are sliding sashes, and the ground floor openings have hood moulds. At the rear is a three-light mullioned window.	II
House southwest of Green Farm; 53.04830°N 1.60093°W		17th century	The house is in gritstone with the remains of a plinth, and a tile roof with coped gables and kneelers. There are two storeys and an attic, a front of three bays, and a lower north wing with a slate roof. The central doorway has a chamfered surround, the windows in the ground floor are sashes, and in the upper floor they are casements. In the east gable end is a blocked two-light mullioned window with a moulded surround.	II
Prospect House; 53.04740°N 1.60200°W		17th century	The house is in gritstone and has a tile roof with gables and kneelers. There are two storeys, rear outshuts, and a central doorway on the front. Some windows are mullioned with casements, some have a single light, and there is a sash window.	II
Cottage to the north of Townend Farm; 53.04803°N 1.60615°W		17th century	The cottage is in gritstone, partly rendered, with a tile roof. There are two storeys, and on the front is a porch. The windows on the front are casements with large lintels, and on the east gable end is a two-light recessed mullioned window with a hood mould.	II
Farmhouse and outbuildings south of Well Banks; 53.04619°N 1.60109°W		17th century	The farmhouse and attached outbuildings are under a continuous tile roof. They are in gritstone, with two storeys, and the house at the south end. The windows are casements with moulded surrounds.	II
Moorside Cottage; 53.05350°N 1.60228°W		Early 18th century	The cottage is in gritstone with a tile roof, two storeys and two bays. In the centre is a doorway with a stone lintel and a 17th-century door, and the windows have two lights and are chamfered and mullioned.	II
Northfield Farmhouse and wall 53.04821°N 1.60204°W		Early 18th century	The farmhouse is in gritstone, and has a tile roof with coped gables and kneelers. There are two storeys and attics, a double-fronted south front, and two gabled rear wings. The central doorway has a moulded surround, an entablature, a rectangular fanlight, and a canopy. The windows on the front are sashes, and in the rear wings are mullioned windows. In front of the garden is a low wall with moulded copings, cast iron railings, and square gate posts with moulded caps.	II
The Manor House; 53.04816°N 1.60222°W		Early 18th century	The house is in gritstone, and has a slate roof, two storeys and attics, and a symmetrical front of three bays. The central doorway has a quoined surround and a flat bracketed hood, and above it is a staircase window rising through two floors. In the outer bays are mullioned windows that contain two casements.	II
Topshill Farmhouse; 53.05341°N 1.59581°W		Early 18th century	The farmhouse, to which a bay was later added, is in gritstone, and has a tile roof with moulded kneelers. There are two storeys and four bays. The doorway has a massive surround, and the windows are mullioned, and contain casements.	II
Green Farmhouse; 53.04856°N 1.60067°W		18th century	The farmhouse is in red brick and gritstone, with quoins, and a tile roof with coped gables. The south front has two storeys and attics, and three bays. The doorway is in the centre, the windows in the lower two floors are sashes, and the top floor contains casements. At the rear is a projecting stair tower with a stair window.	II
Gate piers, Holy Trinity Church; 53.04830°N 1.60045°W		18th century	The gate piers, which were moved from another site, are in gritstone. Each pier has a square plan, two fluted faces, a frieze with rosettes, a moulded cornice, and a banded ball finial.	II
House southwest of churchyard gates 53.04818°N 1.60082°W		Mid 18th century	The house is in gritstone, with a chamfered eaves band, and a tile roof with coped gables and kneelers. There are two storeys and an attic, and a single bay. The doorway has a quoined surround, and the windows are sashes with voussoirs and keystones.	II
Outbuildings west of The Barley Mow Inn; 53.04779°N 1.60445°W		18th century	The outbuildings, later used for other purposes, are in gritstone with tile roofs. They are in three parts, the eastern part with two storeys, casement windows, and an external stone staircase. The middle part has quoins and mullioned windows, and the western part has been converted.	II
Topshill Barn; 53.05351°N 1.59613°W	—	18th century	The barn, originally a cowshed, is in gritstone, and has a tile roof with coped gables. There are two storeys, and it contains three doorways, two with massive lintels, and two of them converted into windows. Two of the lintels are dated, in the upper floor there are three window openings, and on the east end is an external staircase.	II
Upperfield Farmhouse and barn 53.05556°N 1.62256°W		Late 18th century	The farmhouse and barn are in gritstone, with coped gables, and two storeys under a continuous roof. The farmhouse has a tile roof with kneelers, and three bays. The doorway and the windows have massive lintels, and the windows are casements. The barn to the west has a slate roof, it contains three doorways with massive lintels, and an upper floor opening. Between the farmhouse and the barn is a full height opening.	II
Outbuildings, Mill Fields Farm; 53.04345°N 1.63332°W	—	18th or early 19th century	Originally probably a cowhouse with a loft, it is in gritstone, and has a tile roof with a coped gable. There are two storeys, and two doorways, one blocked and converted into a window. The windows have stone lintels and sills, and one has a mullion.	II
Cottage, wall, piers and gate north of Methodist Church; 53.04751°N 1.60129°W		Early 19th century	The cottage is in gritstone, and has a tile roof with coped gables and kneelers. There are two storeys and two bays. In the centre is a gabled porch, and the windows have Gothic glazing. The boundary wall has chamfered copings, the gate piers are in stone, and the gate is in Gothic style.	II
Well Banks; 53.04653°N 1.60116°W		Early 19th century	A school, later converted into a cottage, it is in gritstone, and has a tile roof with a coped gable on the west end. There are two storeys and four bays. All the openings have depressed arched heads. The fanlight and the windows contain Gothic glazing bars.	II
Methodist Sunday School; 53.04720°N 1.60168°W		1836	The building, now a chapel, is in gritstone, partly rendered, and a tile roof. There is a single storey and two [[bay a tile roof with coped gables and kneelers. There are two storeys bays]]. In the centre is a doorway, it is flanked by sash windows, and above it is an inscribed and dated plaque.	II
Mill Fields Farmhouse; 53.04334°N 1.63308°W	—	Early 19th century	The farmhouse is in rendered brick and has a tile roof with coped gables and kneelers. There are two storeys and attics, and the farmhouse is double fronted. The central doorway has a round head, and a semicircular fanlight with decorative glazing bars and a keystone. The windows are casements with depressed arches.	II
