= Haarlem Mill =

Cotton mill in Derbyshire, England

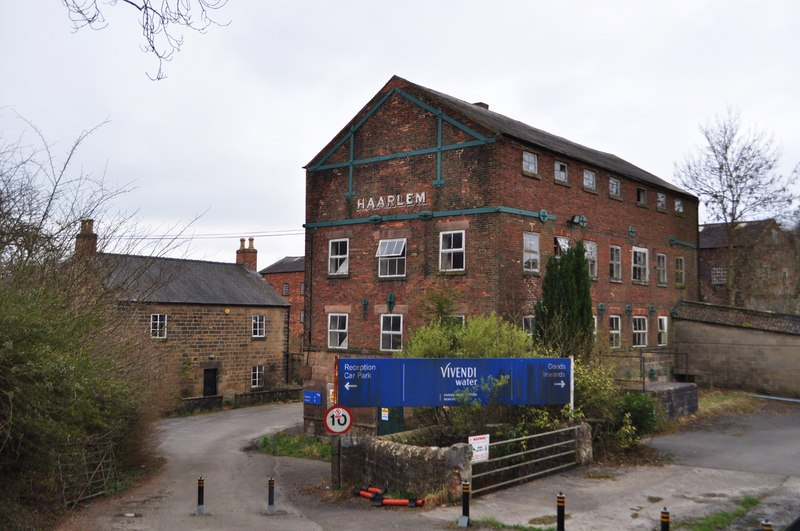
- The mill in 2011

- Location in Derbyshire

Spinning watermill
- Location: Wirksworth, Derbyshire, England
- Client: Richard Arkwright
- Coordinates: 53.069°N 1.577°W

Construction
- Built: 1777
- Completed: 1780
- Employees: 200 in 1789

Power
- Engine maker: Francis Thompson of Ashover
- Engine type: Supplementary atmospheric
- Cylinder diameter and throw: 5ft
- Flywheel diameter: 18ft

Water Power
- Wheels: Prime mover

Haarlem Mill, on the River Ecclesbourne in Wirksworth, Derbyshire, was an early cotton mill. Built by Richard Arkwright, it was the first cotton mill in the world to use a steam engine, though this was used to supplement the supply of water to the mill's water wheel, not to drive the machinery directly.

The site of the mill, including an older corn mill, was leased by Arkwright in 1777. Construction of the mill building in brick and stone was completed by June 1780, and the reported death of a young man attempting to climb on the water wheel suggests that it was operational at this date. After initially investigating the purchase of a steam engine from the Birmingham firm of Boulton and Watt, Arkwright installed a reciprocating steam engine, probably manufactured by Francis Thompson of Ashover, to supplement the occasionally inadequate water supply. This was a medium-sized engine with a 26-foot-long (7.9 m) beam, an 18-foot-diameter (5.5 m) flywheel a 30-inch-diameter (760 mm) cylinder and a stroke of 5 feet (1.5 m). Similar to engines commonly used at the time to pump out nearby mines, it operated 24 hours a day, powering two pumps.

By 1789 the mill was employing almost 200 people, but it was sold by Arkwright three years later. The base of the original building survives, but the upper three floors have since been rebuilt. The empty grade II* listed building was listed on Historic England's Heritage at Risk Register but in 2018 was noted that a major phase of repair and conversion work had been completed.

== See also ==
- Grade II* listed buildings in Derbyshire Dales
- Listed buildings in Wirksworth

== Bibliography ==
- Fitton, R. S. (1989), The Arkwrights: spinners of fortune, Manchester: Manchester University Press, ISBN 978-0-7190-2646-1
- Tann, Jennifer (July 1979), "Arkwright's Employment of Steam Power", Business History, 21 (2): 247–250, doi:10.1080/00076797900000030
