= Holy Trinity Church, Kirk Ireton =

Coordinates: 53°2′55.18″N 1°35′59.57″W

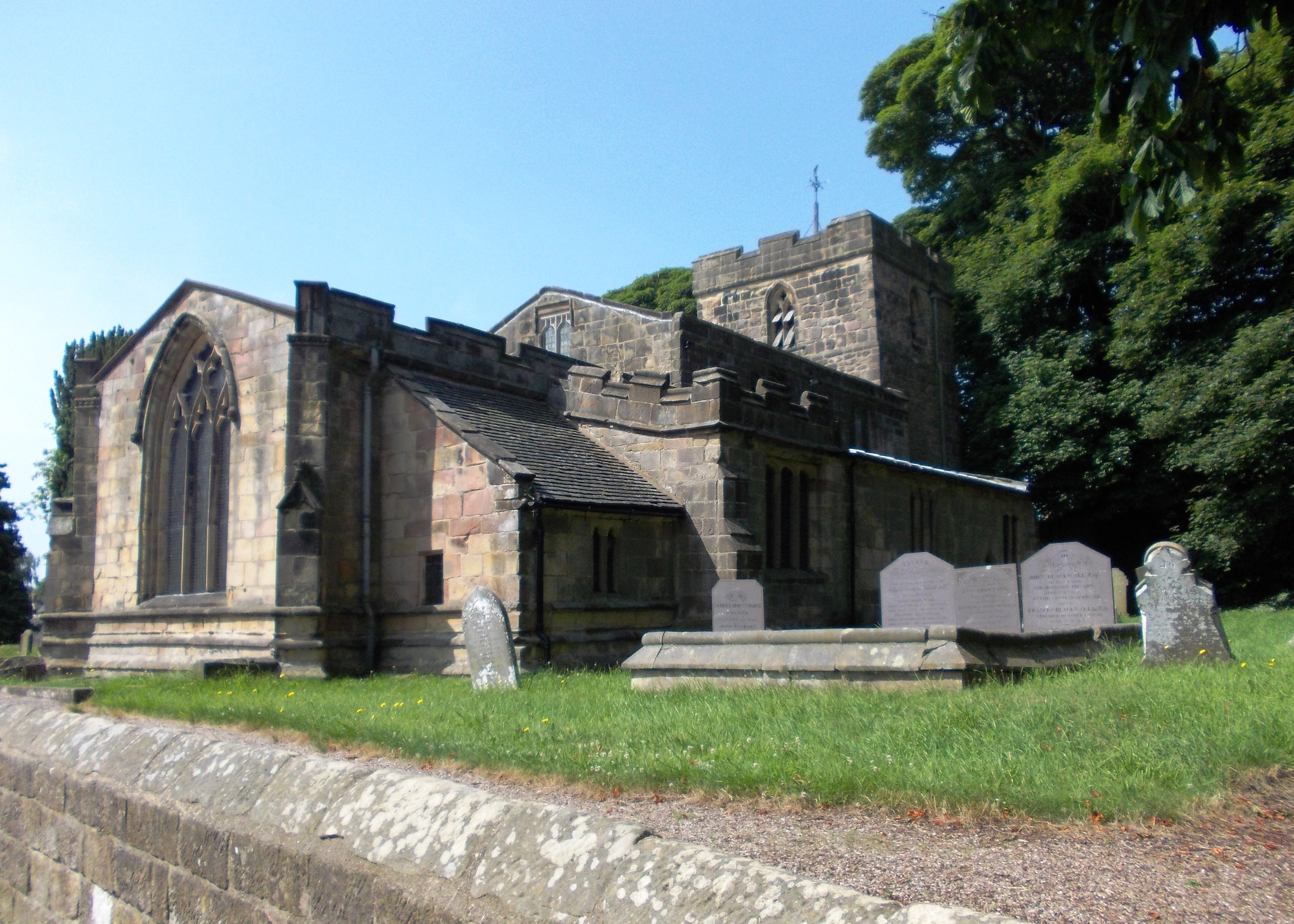
- Holy Trinity Church, Kirk Ireton
- Holy Trinity Church, Kirk Ireton
- Location: Kirk Ireton
- Country: England
- Denomination: Church of England

History
- Dedication: Holy Trinity

Architecture
- Heritage designation: Grade I listed

Administration
- Diocese: Diocese of Derby
- Archdeaconry: Chesterfield
- Deanery: Wirksworth
- Parish: Kirk Ireton

Holy Trinity Church, Kirk Ireton, is a Grade I listed parish church in the Church of England in Kirk Ireton, Derbyshire.

== History ==
The church dates from the 12th century. It comprises a west tower, nave, aisles and clerestory, a south porch and chancel with one bay, chapels and a vestry.

It was restored in 1873 by Evans and Jolley from Nottingham, with the masonry work being carried out by William and Benjamin Doxey.

== Parish status ==
The church is in a joint parish with

- All Saints' Church, Alderwasley
- St James the Apostle's Church, Bonsall
- All Saints' Church, Bradbourne
- All Saints’ Church, Ballidon
- St James’ Church, Brassington
- St Margaret's Church, Carsington
- All Saints’ Church, Elton
- St James’ Church, Idridgehay
- Holy Trinity Church, Middleton-by-Wirksworth
- St Mary's Church, Wirksworth

== Organ ==
The pipe organ was built by Henry Willis in 1859. A specification of the organ can be found on the National Pipe Organ Register.

== See also ==
- Grade I listed churches in Derbyshire
- Grade I listed buildings in Derbyshire
- Listed buildings in Kirk Ireton
