= St Mary's Church, Wirksworth =

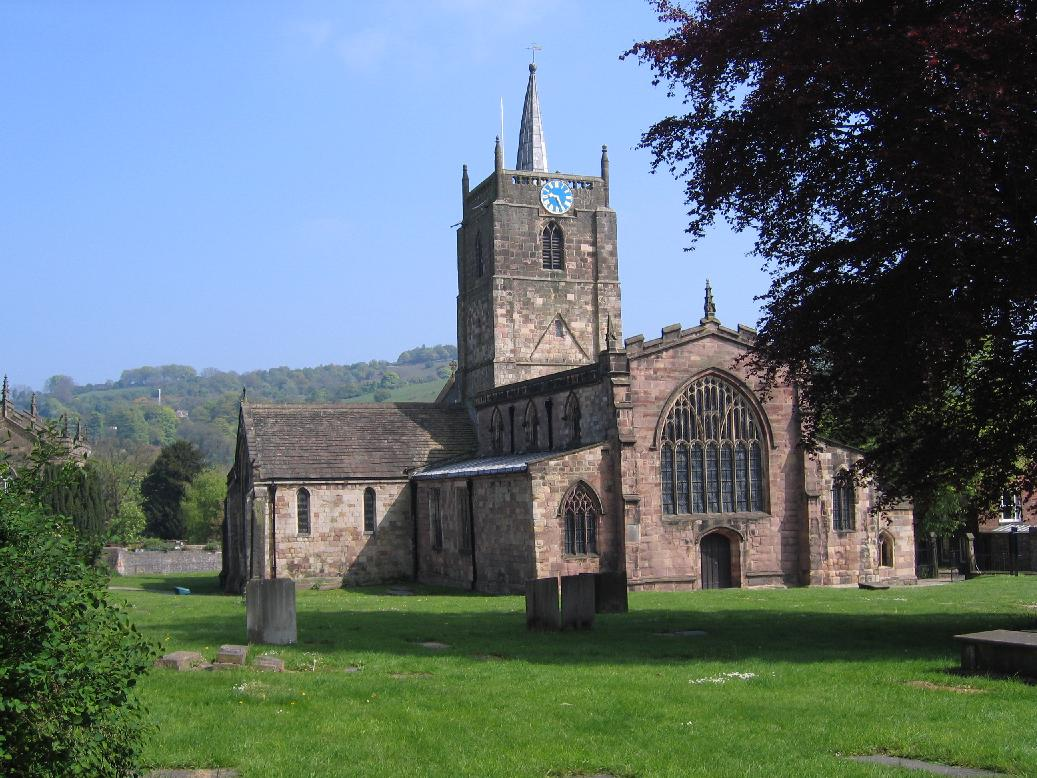
- St Mary's Church, Wirksworth
- 53.08221°N 1.57404°W
- OS grid reference: SK 28748 53942
- Country: England
- Denomination: Church of England
- Churchmanship: Broad Church
- Website: www.wirksworthteamministry.co.uk

History
- Dedication: St Mary the Virgin

Architecture
- Heritage designation: Grade I listed building
- Designated: 24 October 1950
- Architectural type: Perpendicular Gothic

Specifications
- Length: 142ft
- Width: 102ft

Administration
- Province: Canterbury
- Diocese: Diocese of Derby
- Parish: Wirksworth

Clergy
- Rector: Canon David Truby

St Mary the Virgin is a parish church in the Church of England in Wirksworth, Derbyshire. It is a Grade I listed building. The existing building dates mostly from the 13th–15th centuries, but notable survivals from the Anglo-Saxon period indicate a church has stood on this site since at least the 8th century AD. It was restored in 1820, then in 1870 by Sir Gilbert Scott.

== Description ==
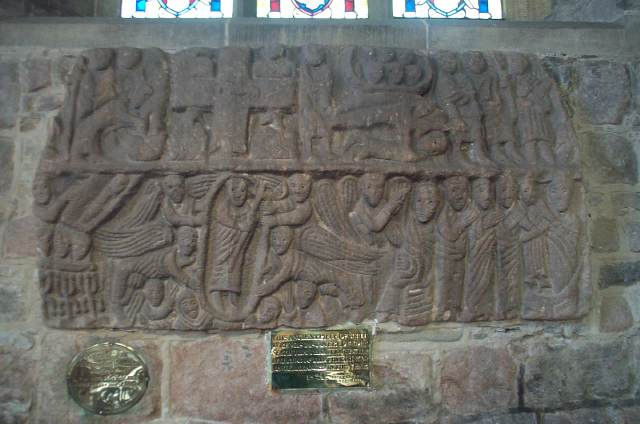
Anglo-Saxon coffin lid on the north wall

The church is notable for its Anglo-Saxon carvings, and a large Anglo-Saxon coffin lid which was discovered under the chancel floor near the sanctuary in 1820. It is now mounted on the north wall of the nave. It appears to date from the second half of the 7th century. The church is also noted for containing an Anglo-Saxon carving of a lead miner, "T'owd Man", the oldest representation of a miner anywhere in the world. It was moved here in 1863 from Bonsall church for safe-keeping and has never been returned. The parishioners of Bonsall have had a replica carved for their church. The church also contains numerous early medieval and medieval carvings, many fragments of larger pieces, that have been grouped together and inserted for display in the transept walls. These include fragments of early medieval stone crosses and medieval grave slabs, figures of a wise man and shepherd, and the face of a bearded man.

It is one of the few remaining churches in Britain which still performs the ancient custom of clipping the church. This takes place on the first Sunday after 8 September, the Sunday after the Feast of the Nativity of the Blessed Virgin Mary.

The nave roof was replaced in 2020, following leaks which threatened to damage the church interior. A traditional topping out ceremony was held with the Bishop of Derby on 18 August 2020.

The church has commissioned a new poem about the tower and bells of St Mary's.

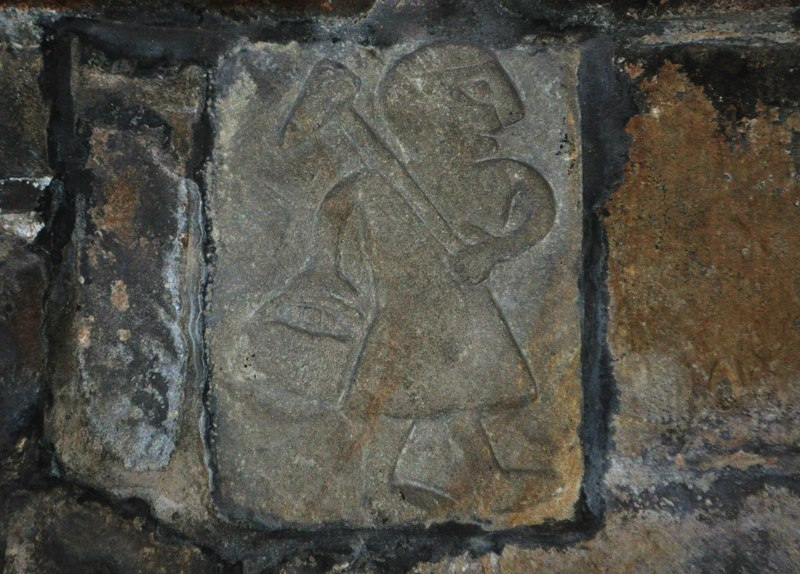
Th' owd Man, the oldest known representation of a miner

== Memorials ==
In the north aisle are the tombs of the Gell family. Sir Anthony Gell (d. 1583) has his statue on his tomb. Alongside is the simpler tomb of his father, Sir Ralph Gell.

The chancel contains the tomb of Sir Anthony Lowe, a Gentleman of the Bedchamber who served Henry VII, Henry VIII, Edward VI and Mary I and died in 1555.

Abraham Bennet, the inventor of the gold-leaf electroscope and developer of an improved magnetometer.

The churchyard contains the tomb of Matthew Peat of Alderwasley, who died 11 December 1751, at an alleged age of 109 years and 10 months.

== Parish status ==
The church is in a joint parish with

- All Saints' Church, Alderwasley
- St James the Apostle's Church, Bonsall
- All Saints' Church, Bradbourne
- All Saints' Church, Ballidon
- St James' Church, Brassington
- St Margaret's Church, Carsington
- All Saints' Church, Elton
- St James' Church, Idridgehay
- Holy Trinity Church, Kirk Ireton
- Holy Trinity Church, Middleton-by-Wirksworth

== Vicars ==
This list is taken from the list displayed by the South Porch door inside the church, except where noted otherwise.

- 1270 Nicholas de Oxton
- 1272 Richard de Middleton
- 1275 William Godman
- 1287 Appointment made but name not recorded
- 1295 Appointment made but name not recorded
- 1299 Robert de Bradborn
- 1313 Milo de Leicester
- 1326 John de Hale
- 1349 Robert de Darbi
- ???? Robert de Irton
- 1362 Robert Spondai
- ???? Thomas Chastelton
- 1397 John Sotheren
- ???? John Howes
- 1410 Bartholomew Lyburgh
- ???? John Masson
- 1422 John Rolf
- 1432 Thomas Eyton
- 1487 Richard Smyth
- 1504 James Baresforthe
- 1520 Anthony Draycott
- 1560 John Hyron
- 1577 Michael Harrison DD
- 1600 Tobias Stoyte
- 1615 William Parker
- 1619 Richard Caryer
- 1633 Robert Topham
- 1650 Martin Topham
- 1660 Peter Wilkinson
- 1667 Thomas Brown (or Browne; Archdeacon)
- 1689 William Browne
- 1705 Richard Willis
- 1714 John Inett
- 1718 Thomas Inett
- 1746 Thomas Harris
- 1778 Richard Tillard
- 1787 Richard Kaye
- 1790 John Chaloner
- 1815 George de Smith Kelley
- 1824 Henry Gordon
- 1831 William Edward Nassau Molesworth
- 1831 John Harward
- 1851 Thomas Tunstall Smith
- 1893 William Harry Arkwright
- 1902 Hubert Arnold Gem (previously vicar of All Saints' Church, Nottingham)
- 1913 Thomas Beedham Charlesworth
- 1917 Herbert Ham
- 1925 Arthur Lionel Edwards
- 1935 Stephen Langrish Caiger
- 1951 Geoffrey Busby
- 1984 Robert S. Caney (Rector)
- 2004 David C. Truby (Rector)
- 2023 Neil T. Griffiths (Rector)

== Organ ==
In 1826 a two-manual organ was installed by Thomas Elliot. It cost £400 (equivalent to £34,305 as of 2025), raised by subscriptions, and was placed in the tower of the church, but it was removed in 1853 to a more convenient location in the nave.

The church had a three-manual 26-speaking-stop tubular pneumatic-action pipe organ installed in the north transept in 1899 by Brindley & Foster. It was rebuilt in 1955 by Kingsgate Davidson with electric action.

This organ was replaced in 1987 by a three-manual 48-speaking-stop Makin electronic digital organ.

=== Organists ===
- George Frederick Simms ????–1832 (afterwards organist of St Oswald's Church, Ashbourne)
- Thomas Reeves 1832–60
- Edward Birch 1860–78
- Nicholas Mason Day 1878–98
- Carl Ashover 1899–1916
- F. Isherwood-Plummer 1920–1922 (previously organist of St Alkmund's Church, Derby)
- Edward S. Jones c. 1923–36
- Hingley James 1936–????
- Harold Udall Ogdon
- Christopher Dixon 1980–2023

== See also ==
- Grade I listed churches in Derbyshire
- Grade I listed buildings in Derbyshire
- Listed buildings in Wirksworth
