= William Craven =

William Craven may refer to:

- William Craven (Lord Mayor of London) (died 1618), founder of Burnsall school
- William Craven, 1st Earl of Craven (1608–1697), son of the Lord Mayor of London
- William Craven, 2nd Baron Craven (1668–1711), English nobleman
- William Craven, 3rd Baron Craven (1700–1739), English nobleman
- William Craven, 5th Baron Craven (1705–1769), English nobleman
- William Craven (priest) (1730–1815), priest and master of St John's College, Cambridge
- William Craven, 6th Baron Craven (1738–1791), English nobleman
- William Craven, 1st Earl of Craven (British Army officer) (1770–1825) (the title having been re-created), British soldier
- William Craven, 2nd Earl of Craven (1809–1866), British peer
- William Craven, 4th Earl of Craven (1868–1921), British peer and Liberal politician
- William Craven-Ellis (1880–1959), member of UK parliament for Southampton
- William Craven, 5th Earl of Craven (1897–1932), British peer
- William Craven, 6th Earl of Craven (1917–1965), British peer
- William A. Craven, member of the California legislature
- Bill Craven (born 1951), American football player

== See also ==
- William Craven, 1st Earl of Craven (disambiguation)
- William Cravens (disambiguation)
- Earl of Craven
