= Cornelia Craven, Countess of Craven =

American-born heiress who married into the British aristocracy

The Right Honourable The Countess of Craven
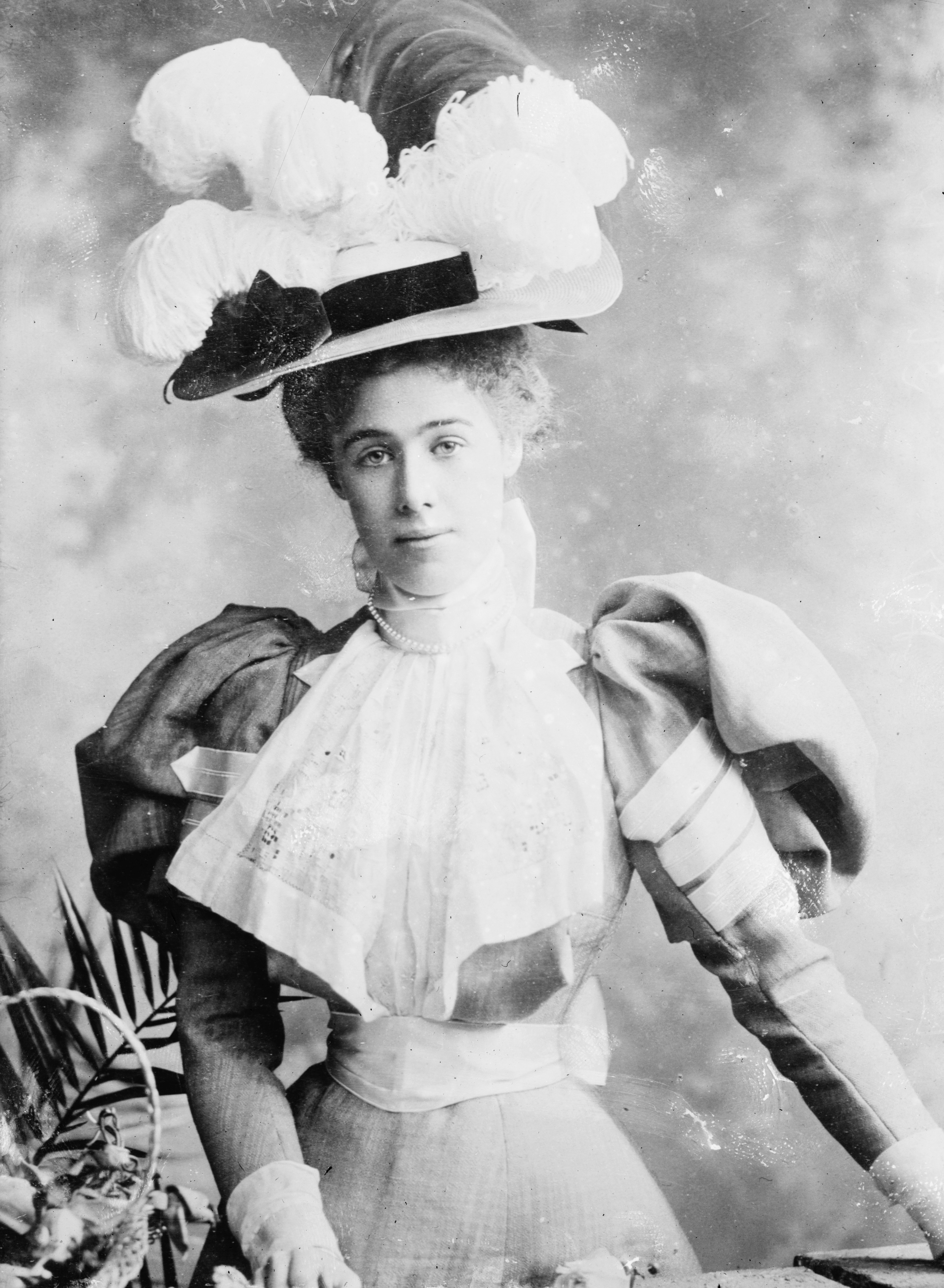
- The Countess of Craven, 1900
- Born: Cornelia Martin; September 22, 1877; New York City, US
- Died: May 24, 1961 (aged 84); Newbury, Berkshire, England
- Spouse: William Craven, 4th Earl of Craven (m. 1893; died 1921)
- Children: William Craven, 5th Earl of Craven
- Parent(s): Bradley Martin; Cornelia Sherman Martin
- Relatives: Frederick Townsend Martin (uncle); William Craven, 6th Earl of Craven (grandson)

Cornelia Craven, Countess of Craven (née Martin; September 22, 1877 – May 24, 1961) was an American-born heiress who married into the British aristocracy and was known as one of the "Dollar Princesses". She was also a prominent art collector.

== Early life ==
Cornelia Martin was born in New York City on September 22, 1877. She was the only daughter of the socially ambitious Bradley Martin and Cornelia Sherman Martin. She had two brothers, Sherman Martin and Bradley Martin Jr., who became president of the Nineteenth Ward Bank.

Her mother threw the infamous society costume party, the Bradley-Martin Ball, at the Waldorf Hotel in 1897. Despite her intentions of creating an economic stimulus during the recession, the event was criticised for its excessive consumption and is today best remembered as among the most extravagant of the Gilded Age excesses.

Her paternal grandparents were Henry Hull Martin and Anna (née Townsend) Martin. Her paternal uncle was Frederick Townsend Martin. Cornelia's mother was the only child and heir of Isaac Sherman, a retired merchant of Buffalo and New York who lived on West Twentieth Street in New York City and was close friends with Abraham Lincoln.

== Personal life ==
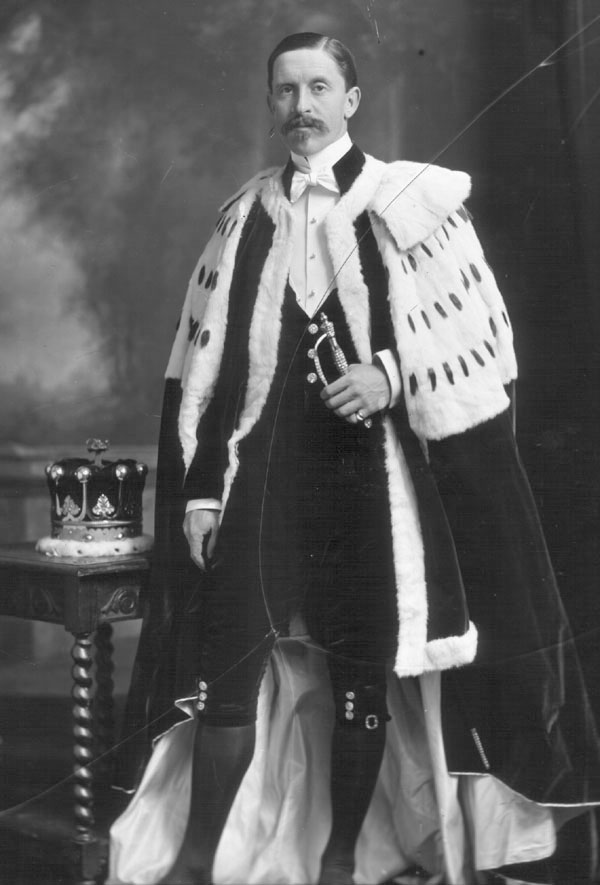
Lady Craven's husband, William Craven, 4th Earl of Craven, in his coronation robe in 1902

While her family was renting Balmacaan, a Scottish highland estate, from Lady Seafield, Cornelia met William Craven, 4th Earl of Craven. Lord Craven, later a Captain of the Yeomen of the Guard and Lord Lieutenant of Warwickshire, had become the Earl of Craven in 1883, at the age of fourteen. William was the eldest son of the late George Craven, 3rd Earl of Craven, and his wife, the former Hon. Evelyn Laura Barrington (second daughter of George Barrington, 7th Viscount Barrington, who was a Member of Parliament for Eye). Cornelia, who was then only sixteen years old, and William, who was twenty-four, were married on April 18, 1893, at Grace Church, New York City. The marriage gave Cornelia a $75,000 a year allowance, and bought the Earl property in Mayfair and paid for the renovation of Coombe Abbey, his family estate in Warwickshire which got a new roof, structural repairs, and its first electric lights. Together, Cornelia and William were the parents of one child, a son and heir born in 1897:

- William George Bradley Craven, 5th Earl of Craven (1897–1932), who married Mary Williamina George, daughter of William George OBE, Town Clerk of Invergordon, on 14 October 1916.

On July 10, 1921, whilst racing at Cowes Week, Lord Craven fell overboard and drowned at age 52, with his body washing ashore two days later.

=== Later life ===
After his death, Cornelia sold Coombe Abbey to a builder named John Grey in 1923 and moved to another Craven estate, Hamstead Lodge in Hamstead Marshall. At Hamstead Marshall, Cornelia often hosted Princess Marie-Louise, a granddaughter of Queen Victoria, who divorced her husband Prince Aribert in 1900 at age 28, and never remarried. Her only child, the 5th Earl, died on September 15, 1932, and was succeeded in the titles by Cornelia's grandson, William Craven, 6th Earl of Craven (1917–1965).

In 1956, she donated Ashdown House, Oxfordshire, which had been requisitioned for use by the British Army during World War II, to the National Trust. The Dowager Countess of Craven died at her home in Newbury, Berkshire on May 24, 1961. After her death, she bequeathed Prince Charles Louis, Count Palatine, by Anthony van Dyck, c. 1637, to the National Portrait Gallery.

== In popular culture ==
Between 1910 and 1914, she was photographed by H. Walter Barnett, which is held by the National Portrait Gallery, London.

During the 2014-2015 exhibition at London's National Portrait Gallery, she was featured among the high-profile American heiresses to marry into British aristocracy. Also included in the exhibition were Margaret Leiter (married to the 19th Earl of Suffolk), Jennie Jerome (married to Lord Randolph Churchill), Mary Leiter (married to the 1st Marquess Curzon of Kedleston), May Cuyler (married to Sir Philip Grey Egerton, 12th Bt), Consuelo Yznaga (married to the 8th Duke of Manchester), Consuelo Vanderbilt (married to the 9th Duke of Marlborough and to Jacques Balsan) and Laura Charteris (married to the 10th Duke of Marlborough).

== Gallery ==
Prominent works of art owned by the Countess of Craven:

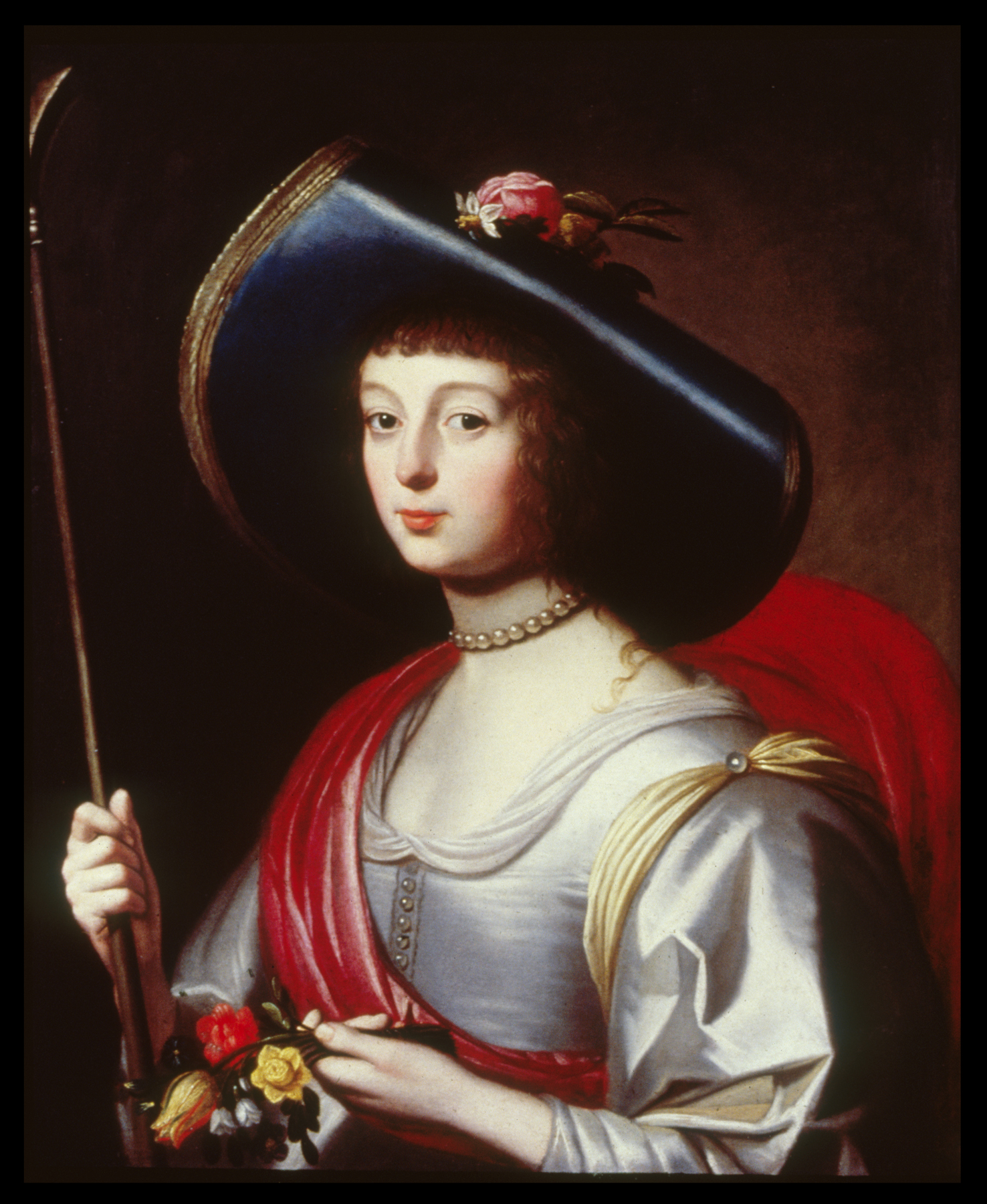
Portrait of a Lady of the Court as a Shepherdess, by Gerard van Honthorst and workshop, c. 1628.

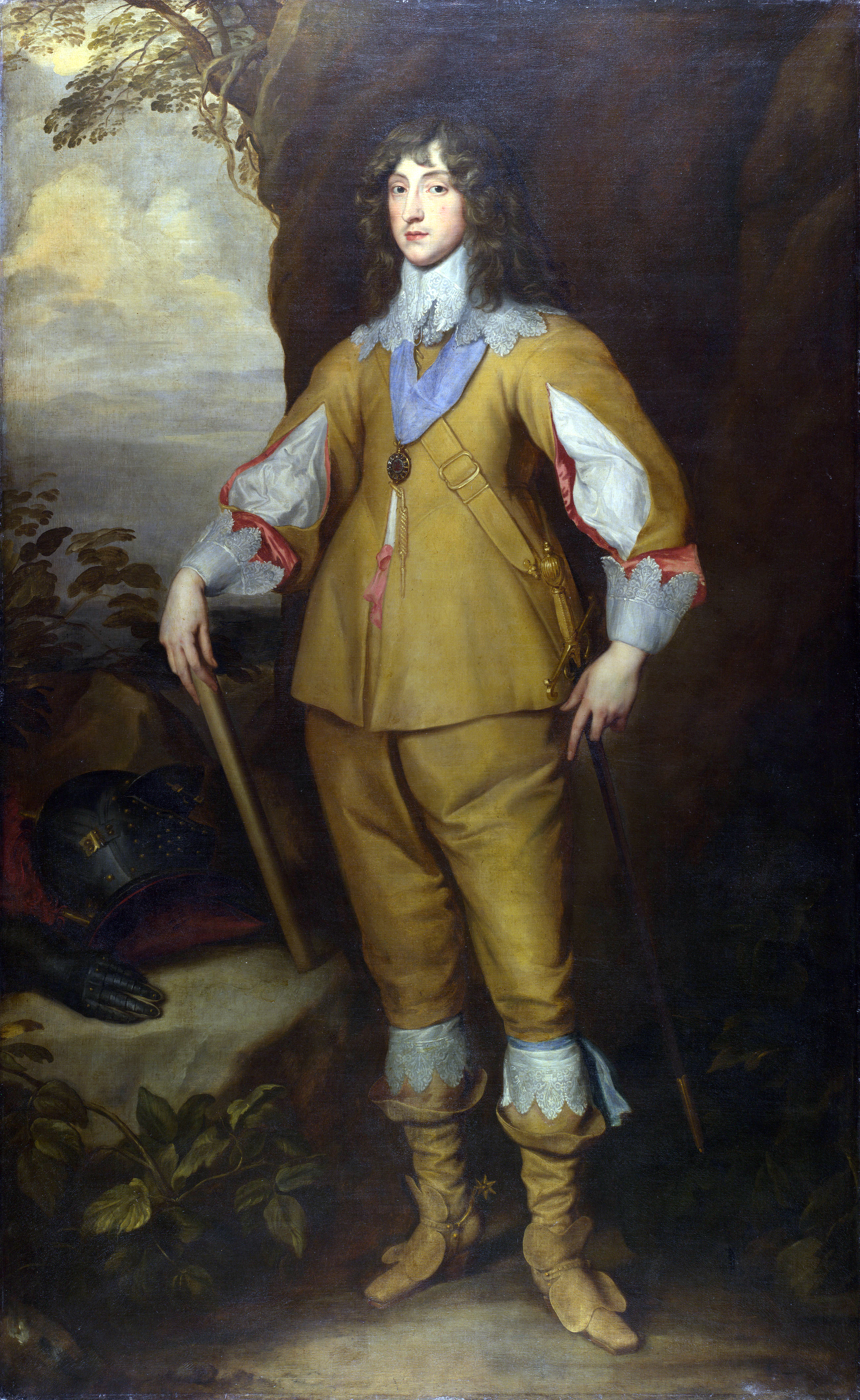
Prince Charles Louis, Count Palatine, by Anthony van Dyck, c. 1637.

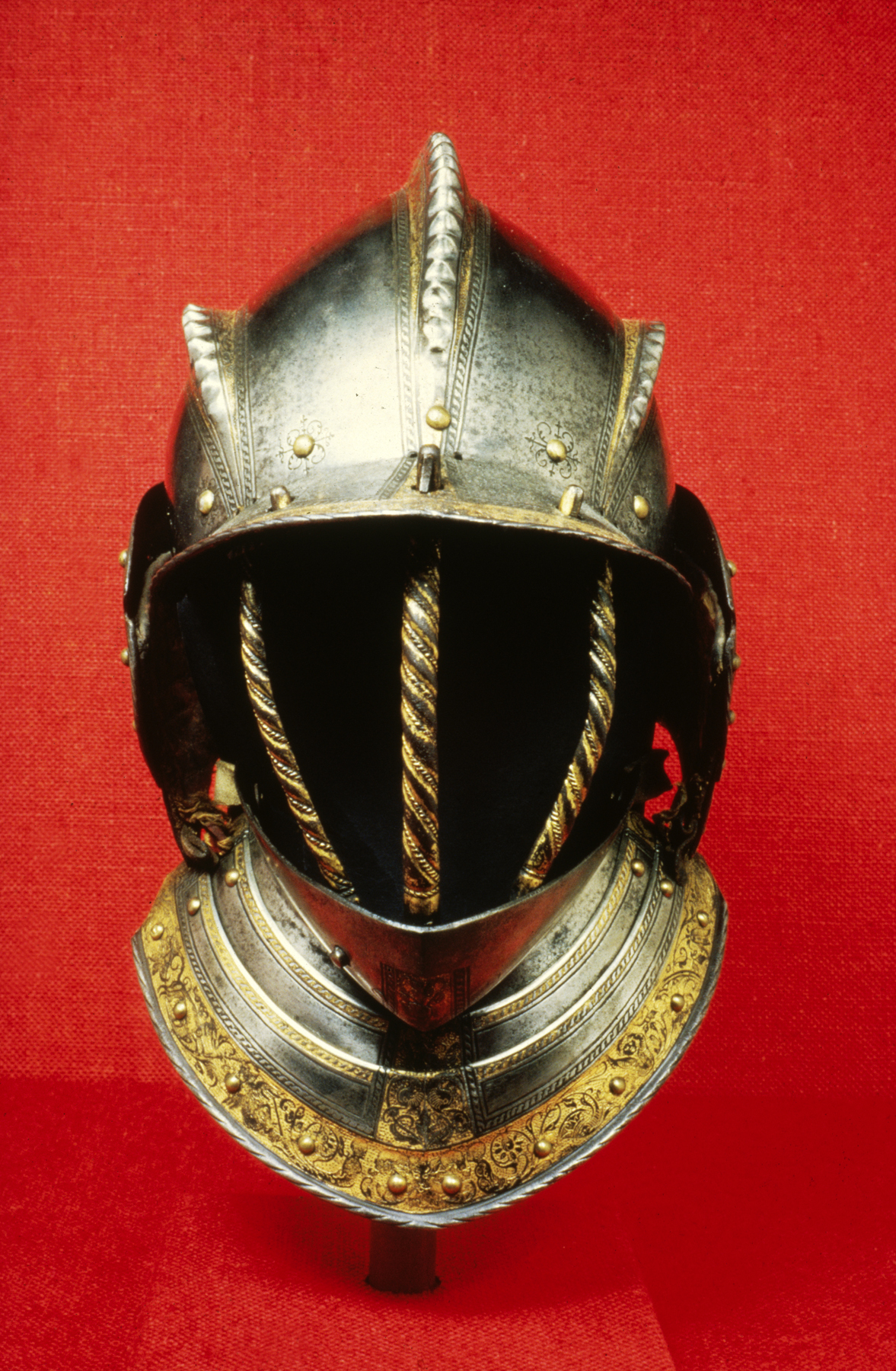
Buronet Helmet and Reinforce for a Field Breastplate of Emperor Maximilian II, c. 1549.

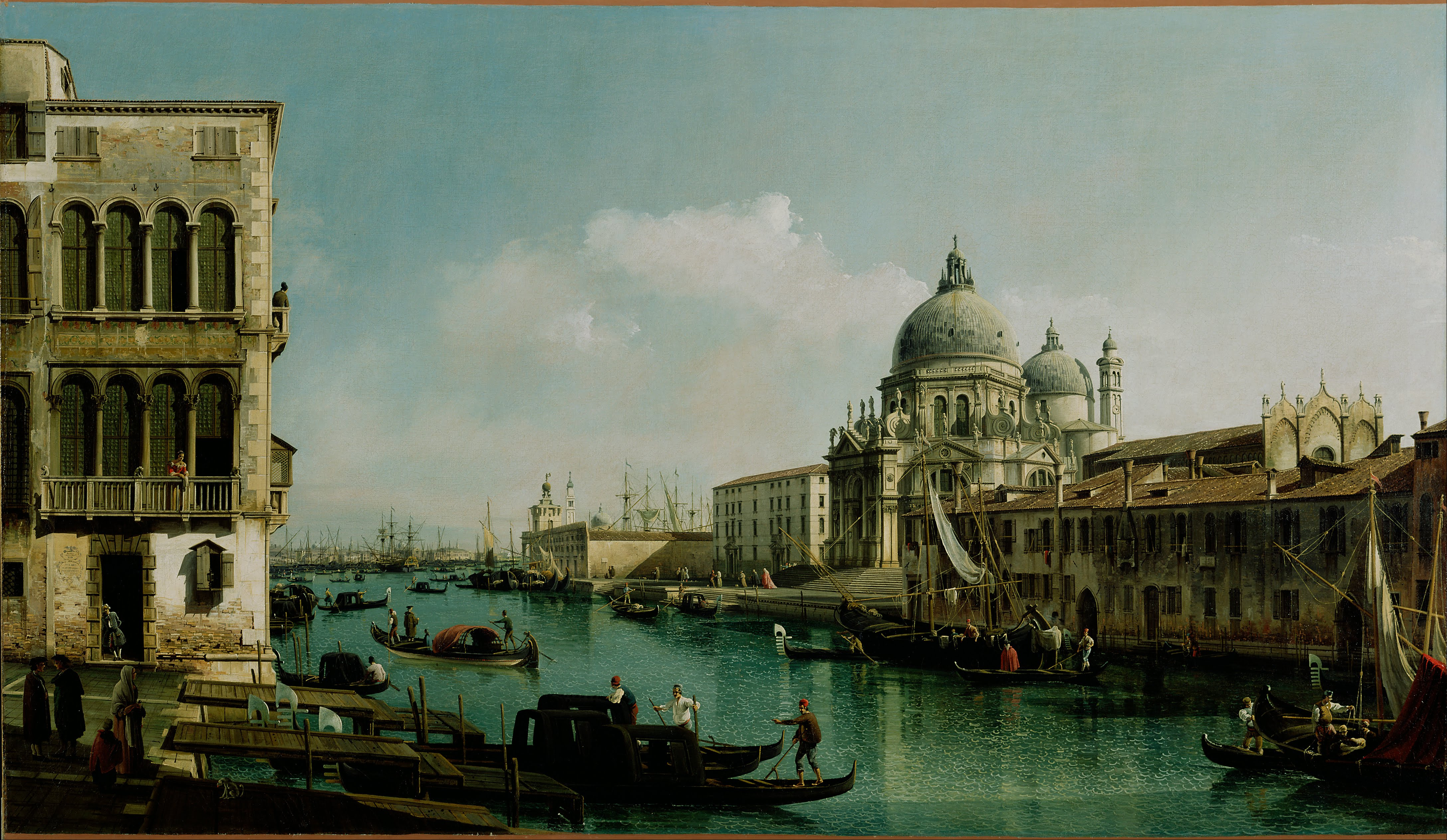
View of the Grand Canal: Santa Maria della Salute and the Dogana from Campo Santa Maria Zobenigo, by Bernardo Bellotto, c. 1743.

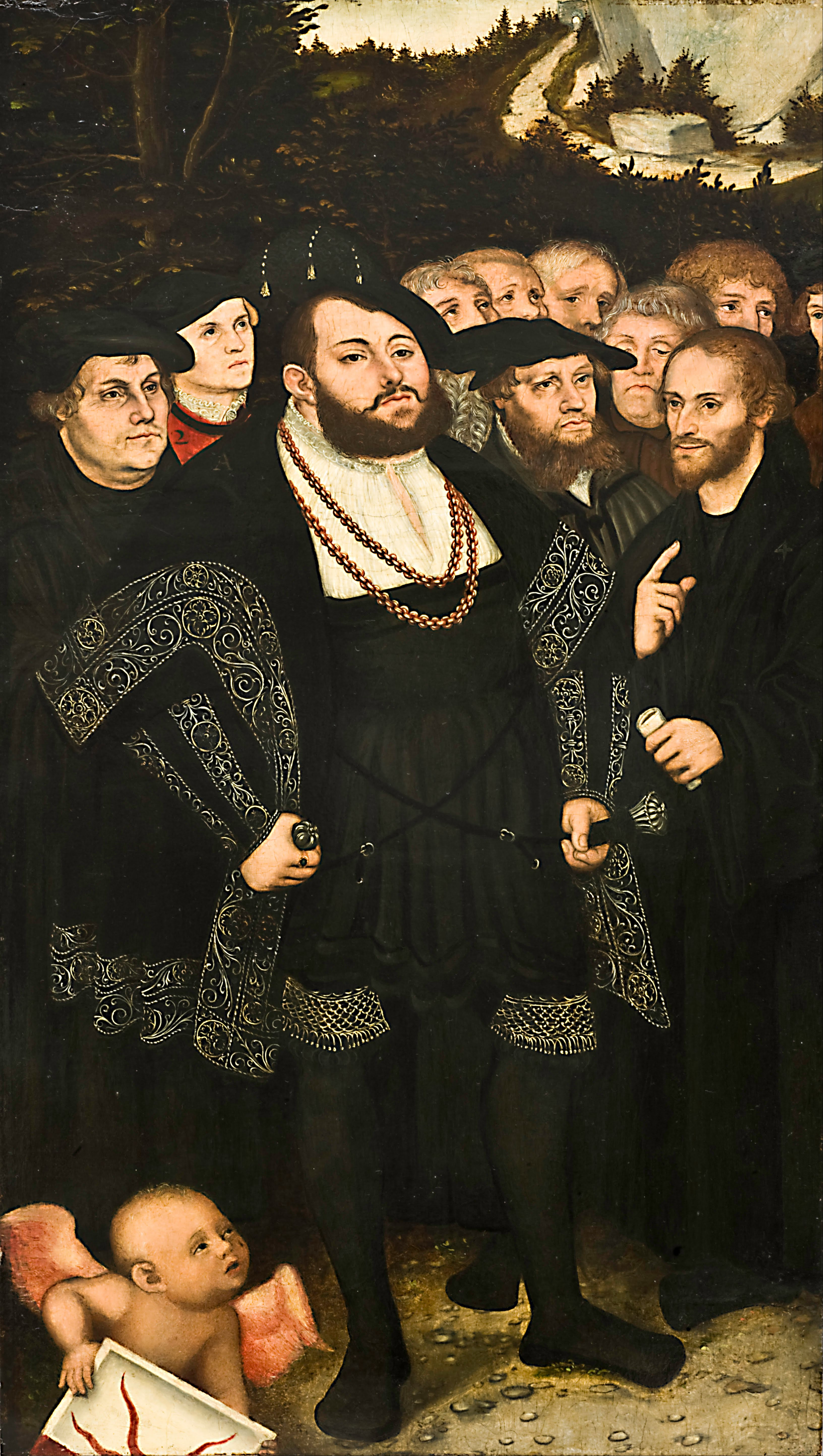
Martin Luther and the Wittenberg Reformers by Lucas Cranach the Younger, c. 1543.
