= William Craven, 1st Earl of Craven =

William Craven, 1st Earl of Craven may refer to:

- William Craven, 1st Earl of Craven (1608–1697), 1st Baron Craven, created Earl in 1664
- William Craven, 1st Earl of Craven (1770–1825), 7th Baron Craven, created Earl in 1801

See also

- William Craven (disambiguation)
