= William Craven, 6th Earl of Craven =

British peer

Lieutenant The Right Honourable The Earl of Craven
- Born: William Robert Bradley Craven; 8 September 1917
- Died: 27 January 1965 (aged 47)
- Education: Downside School; Northamptonshire Institute of Agriculture
- Spouses: Irene Meyrick (m. 1939; div. 1954) Elizabeth Johnstone-Douglas (m. 1954)
- Children: 4
- Parent: William Craven, 5th Earl of Craven
- Relatives: William Craven, 4th Earl of Craven (grandfather); Cornelia, Countess of Craven (grandmother)

William Robert Bradley Craven, 6th Earl of Craven (8 September 1917 – 27 January 1965) was a British peer.

== Early life ==
Craven was born on 8 September 1917 and was the only child of William Craven, 5th Earl of Craven and the former Mary Williamina George, who married in 1916. (Note: In 1922, shortly after his father inherited the earldom following his grandfather's 1921 drowning, the 5th Earl was named in the divorce suit between George Cathcart, 5th Earl Cathcart and Lady Cathcart, the former Vera Estelle (née Fraser) Warter. The Earl obtained a "decree dissolving his marriage with Lady Cathcart, upon proof being given of her indiscretions with the Earl of Craven".) His parents later separated and, in 1925, his mother sued his father for divorce citing the latter's relationship with Vera, Countess of Cathcart. His father died of peritonitis at the age of thirty-five in 1932. His maternal grandfather was William George, the town clerk of Invergordon. His paternal grandparents were William Craven, 4th Earl of Craven and his American wife, the former Cornelia Martin. His grandmother was the only daughter of Bradley Martin and his wife Cornelia, who were famed as the hosts of the Bradley-Martin Ball.

Lord Craven was educated at Downside School and at the Northamptonshire Institute of Agriculture.

== Career ==
Upon the death of his father on 15 September 1932 at the age of thirty-five, he inherited the earldom of Craven as well as the subsidiary titles Baron Craven of Hamstead Marshall and Viscount Uffington.

He served as a second lieutenant in the Coldstream Guards and then as a lieutenant in the Royal Naval Reserve during World War II. Lord Craven was a member of the East Sussex County Council in 1957 and was created a Knight of the Sovereign Military Order of Malta in 1959.

== Personal life ==
On 3 May 1939, Lord Craven married Gwendoline Irene Meyrick, a daughter of Dr. Ferdinand Richard Holmes Meyrick and the former Katherine Evelyn Nason, the infamous owner of the 43 Club. Two of Irene's sisters also married into the British nobility, Mary Meyrick, to the 14th Earl of Kinnoull, and Dorothy Meyrick to the 26th Baron de Clifford. Before their divorce in 1954, they were the parents of one daughter:

- Lady Sarah Jane Craven (b. 1940), who married South African David Thomson Glover, a son of Col. John William Thomson-Glover, in 1961.

After his divorce, Lord Craven married Elizabeth Gwendolen Teresa Johnstone-Douglas (1916–2011), a daughter of Sholto Johnstone Douglas, on 25 September 1954. A granddaughter of Arthur Johnstone-Douglas, she was a direct descendant of Charles Douglas, 6th Marquess of Queensberry. Together, they were the parents of three children:

- Thomas Robert Douglas Craven, 7th Earl of Craven (1957–1983), who did not marry but left natural issue; he died by suicide.
- Lady Ann Mary Elizabeth Craven (born 9 April 1959), who married Professor Lionel Tarassenko, in 1978.
- Simon George Craven, 8th Earl of Craven (1961–1990), who married Teresa Downes in 1988; he was killed in a road accident at Eastbourne.

Lord Craven died in 1965 and was succeeded in the earldom by his elder son, Thomas.

=== Descendants ===
Through his youngest son Simon, he was a grandfather of Benjamin Robert Joseph Craven (b. 1989), who became the 9th Earl of Craven as an infant upon his father's death in 1990.

Coat of arms of William Craven, 6th Earl of Craven
| Coronet A Coronet of an Earl Crest On a Chapeau Gules turned up Ermine a Griffin statant wings elevated Ermine beaked and foremembered Or Escutcheon Argent a Fess between six Cross Crosslets fitchée Gules Supporters On either side a Griffin wings elevated Ermine beaked and foremembered Or Motto Virtus In Actione Consistit (Virtue consists in action) |

Peerage of the United Kingdom
| Preceded by William Craven | Earl of Craven; 1932–1965 | Succeeded by Thomas Craven |
