= Fulwar Craven, 4th Baron Craven =

English nobleman and sportsman

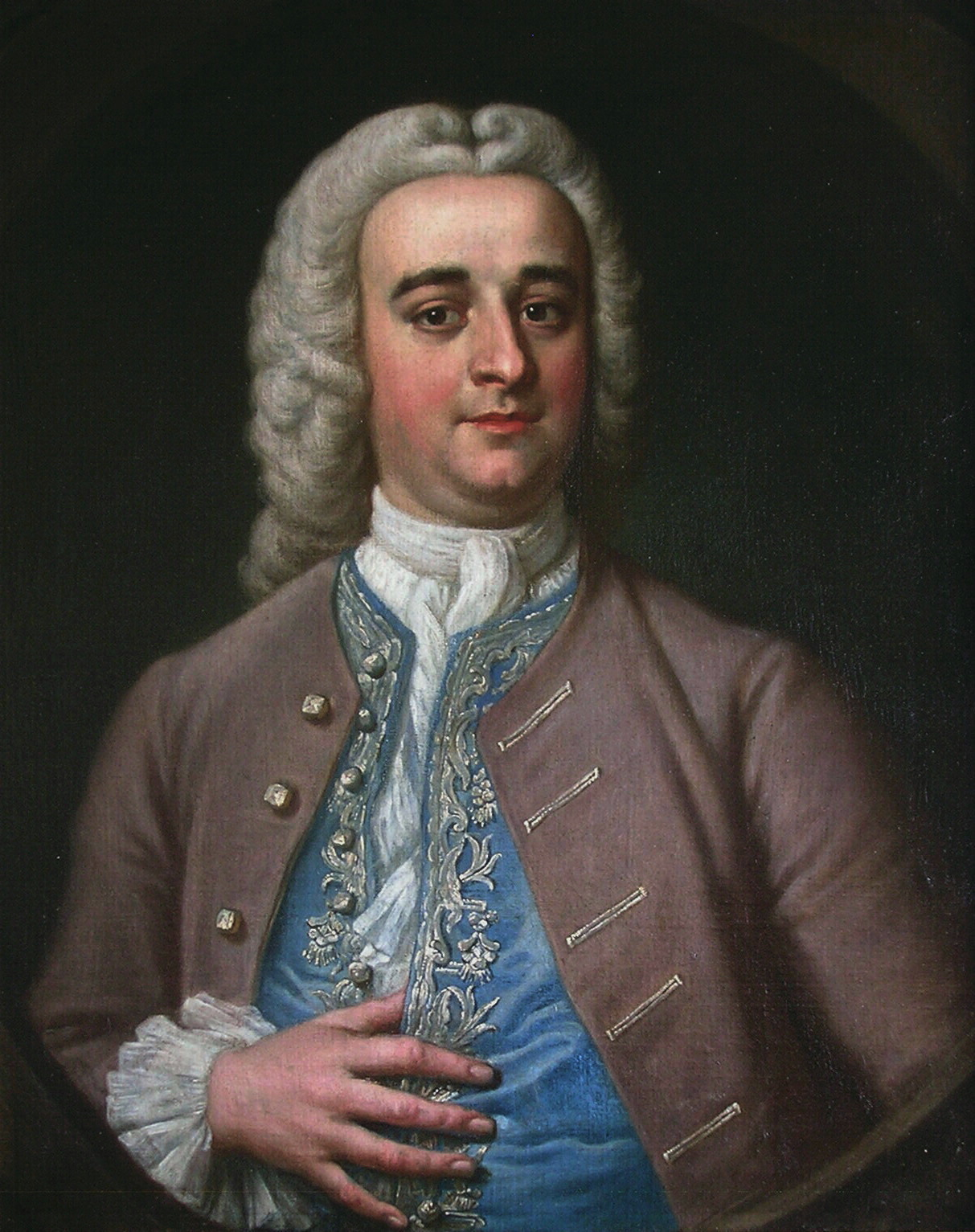
- portrait by James Latham
- Born: 25 June 1782
- Died: 14 April 1860 (aged 77)
- Spouse(s): Laura Vansittart

Fulwar Craven, 4th Baron Craven (died 10 November 1764) was an English nobleman and sportsman.

He was educated at Rugby School and Magdalen College, Oxford. He became High Steward of Newbury, and was about to stand for Parliament for Berkshire when his brother William's death in 1739 brought him the Barony of Craven.

He was famously fond of racing and hunting, hunting on his Berkshire estates at Hamstead Marshall and Ashdown Park, keeping his own stud of racehorses and founding a racecourse at Lambourn. He and his brother William founded the Craven Hunt, and he appears in James Seymour's 1743 A Kill at Ashdown Park, a picture owned by the Craven family until 1968.

When not hunting, Craven resided at Coombe Abbey, near Coventry in Warwickshire. He continued to hunt until his death at old Benham Park in 1764 after a long illness. He was buried at Hamstead Marshall, and being unmarried and childless, was succeeded by his nephew William.

Peerage of England
Preceded by William Craven	Baron Craven; 1739–1764	Succeeded by William Craven
