= George Craven, 3rd Earl of Craven =

British peer (1841–1883)

The Right Honourable The Earl of Craven

Lord Lieutenant of Berkshire
- In office 1881–1883
- Preceded by: The Earl of Abingdon
- Succeeded by: The Marquess of Ailesbury

Personal details
- Born: George Grimston Craven; 16 March 1841
- Died: 7 December 1883 (aged 42)
- Spouse: Hon. Evelyn Barrington (m. 1867)
- Children: William Craven, 4th Earl of Craven
- Parents: William Craven, 2nd Earl of Craven; Lady Emily Mary Grimston

George Grimston Craven, 3rd Earl of Craven (16 March 1841 – 7 December 1883) was a British peer.

== Early life ==
Craven was born on 16 March 1841. He was the eldest surviving son born to William Craven, 2nd Earl of Craven and his wife, the former Lady Emily Mary Grimston (1815–1901).

His paternal grandparents were William Craven, 1st Earl of Craven (the eldest son of William Craven, 6th Baron Craven, and his wife Lady Elizabeth Berkeley, who married Charles Alexander, Margrave of Brandenburg-Ansbach after Baron Craven's death) and his wife, Louisa, Countess of Craven, an English former actress. His maternal grandparents were James Grimston, 1st Earl of Verulam and Lady Charlotte Jenkinson (the daughter of Charles Jenkinson, 1st Earl of Liverpool).

== Career ==
He inherited the earldom on 25 August 1866 following the death of his father. His mother survived her husband, and George, by more than 30 years, living until her death in London on 21 May 1901.

Lord Craven served as Lord Lieutenant of Berkshire between 1881 and 1883.

== Personal life ==
On 17 January 1867, Lord Craven married Hon. Evelyn Laura Barrington (1848–1924), the second daughter and co-heiress of George Barrington, 7th Viscount Barrington and the former Isabel Elizabeth Morritt (only child of John Morritt of Rokeby Park). Together, they were the parents of six children, including:

- Lady Mary Beatrix Craven (1867–1881), who died unmarried.
- William Craven, 4th Earl of Craven (1868–1921), who married the American heiress, Cornelia Martin, daughter of banker Bradley Martin, in 1893.
- The Hon. Rupert Cecil Craven OBE (1870–1959), who married Inez Morton Broom, daughter of George Broom in 1899. They divorced in 1908 and he married Josephine Margueritte Banbury (née Reixach y Gisbert) in 1925. Josephine, the widow of Capt. Charles William Banbury, was a daughter of Don José Reixach y Gisbert.
- The Hon. Charles Frederick Craven (1873–1873), who died in infancy.
- Lady Helen Emily Craven (1874–1926), who married Lt. Col. Ian Rose Innes Forbes of Rothiemay Castle in 1901.
- The Hon. Charles Eric Craven (1879–1909), who married Amalia Kolowratek in 1901.

Lord Craven died on 7 December 1883. He was succeeded by his eldest son, who was only fourteen years old.

=== Descendants ===
Through his eldest son, he was a grandfather of William Craven, 5th Earl of Craven.

Through his second son, an electrical engineer who eventually cut timber in Uganda before a 1912 bankruptcy, he was a grandfather of Lt. Commander Rupert José Evelyn Craven RN (b. 1926), the current heir presumptive to the Earldom of Craven.

== Coat of arms ==
Coat of arms of George Craven, 3rd Earl of Craven
Coronet A Coronet of an Earl Crest On a Chapeau Gules turned up Ermine a Griffin statant wings elevated Ermine beaked and foremembered Or Escutcheon Argent a Fess between six Cross Crosslets fitchée Gules Supporters On either side a Griffin wings elevated Ermine beaked and foremembered Or Motto Virtus In Actione Consistit (Virtue consists in action)

Honorary titles
Preceded by The Earl of Abingdon	Lord Lieutenant of Berkshire; 1881–1883	Succeeded by The Marquess of Ailesbury
Peerage of the United Kingdom
Preceded by William Craven	Earl of Craven; 1866–1883	Succeeded by William Craven
