= William Craven, 5th Earl of Craven =

British peer

The Right Honourable The Earl of Craven
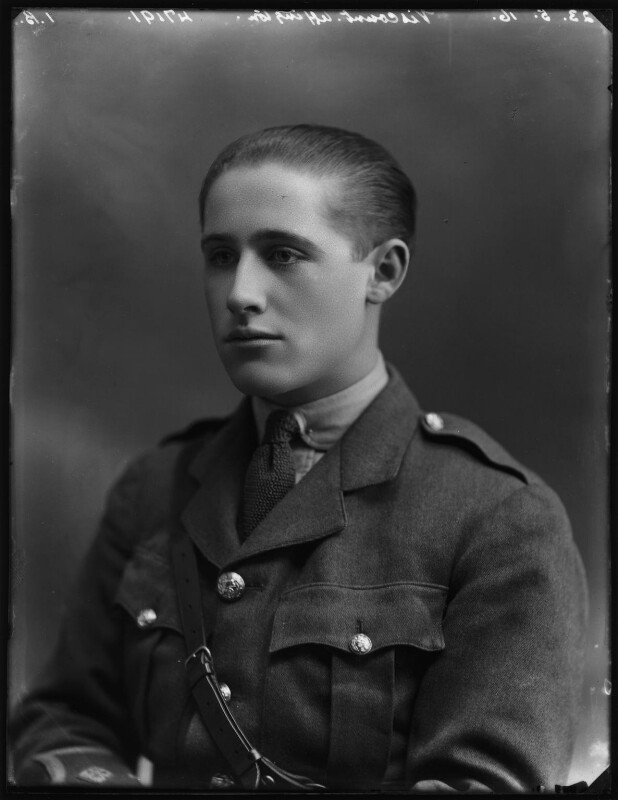
- Craven in 1916
- Born: William George Bradley Craven; 31 July 1897; Combe Abbey, Warwickshire
- Died: 15 September 1932 (aged 35); Pau, France
- Education: Eton College
- Spouse: Mary Williamina George (m. 1916)
- Children: 6th Earl of Craven
- Parent(s): 4th Earl of Craven; Cornelia Martin
- Relatives: Bradley Martin (grandfather)

William George Bradley Craven, 5th Earl of Craven (31 July 1897 – 15 September 1932) was a British peer.

== Early life ==
Craven was born on 31 July 1897 at Combe Abbey, Warwickshire and was baptized by the Archbishop of York on 27 August 1897. He was the only child of William Craven, 4th Earl of Craven (1868–1921), and his American wife, Cornelia Martin (1877–1961).

His paternal grandparents were George Craven, 3rd Earl of Craven and Lady Evelyn Barrington (the second daughter and co-heiress of George Barrington, 7th Viscount Barrington). His mother was the only daughter of Bradley Martin and his wife Cornelia, who were famed as the hosts of the Bradley-Martin Ball.

Craven was educated at Eton College.

== Career ==
Craven "attained his majority in 1918, when his father paid all of his then existing debts", but by September 1919 he was bankrupt with "unsecured liabilities" of £13,610 to assets of only £302. He inherited the earldom at age 23 upon the accidental drowning of his father William Craven, 4th Earl of Craven on 9 July 1921.

The 5th Earl served during the World War I as a Lieutenant with the 3rd Bn. Royal Hampshire Regiment and was wounded in action, losing a leg and sustaining a serious arm injury.

At one time, Lord Craven was mentioned as a possible successor to Lord Byng as Governor General of Canada.

== Personal life ==
On 14 October 1916, when known by the courtesy title Viscount Uffington, he married Mary Williamina George, daughter of William George, the town clerk of Invergordon. Together they had one son:

- William Robert Bradley Craven (1917–1965).

In 1922, shortly after inheriting the earldom, Lord Craven was named in the divorce suit between George Cathcart, 5th Earl Cathcart and Lady Cathcart, the former Vera Estelle Warter. Lord Cathcart obtained a "decree dissolving his marriage with Lady Cathcart, upon proof being given of her indiscretions with the Earl of Craven". Eighteen months after the Cathcart divorce, the Countess eloped to South Africa with Lord Craven. In 1925, Lady Craven sued the Earl for divorce and named Vera, Countess Cathcart, as the woman in the case. In 1926, Lord Craven and Lady Cathcart were again the centre of controversy when arriving to the United States. "While the Countess was held at Ellis Island, a writ for his arrest was issued, but he departed for Canada in time to prevent its being served. His wife joined him in Canada, and they left together for Bermuda," with Lord Craven denying he was ever "guilty of any moral turpitude".

=== Death ===
Lord Craven died on 15 September 1932 of peritonitis at Pau, France, at the age of 35. He was succeeded by his son, William Robert Bradley Craven, 6th Earl of Craven, upon his death on 15 September 1932. The Earl and Countess stayed married and she survived him by 42 years, dying in 1974.

== Coat of arms ==
Coat of arms of William Craven, 5th Earl of Craven
Coronet A Coronet of an Earl Crest On a Chapeau Gules turned up Ermine a Griffin statant wings elevated Ermine beaked and foremembered Or Escutcheon Argent a Fess between six Cross Crosslets fitchée Gules Supporters On either side a Griffin wings elevated Ermine beaked and foremembered Or Motto Virtus In Actione Consistit (Virtue consists in action)

Peerage of the United Kingdom
Preceded by William Craven	Earl of Craven; 1921–1932	Succeeded by William Craven
