= Custos Rotulorum of Berkshire =

Highest Civil Post per County

This is a list of people who have served as Custos Rotulorum of Berkshire.

- Sir William Essex bef. 1544–1548
- Robert Keilway 1549–1581
- Sir Henry Neville bef. 1584–1593
- Sir Edward Norreys 1601–1603
- Sir Henry Neville bef. 1605–1615
- Sir Francis Moore 1615–1621
- Richard Lovelace, 1st Baron Lovelace 1621–1634
- William Craven, 1st Earl of Craven 1634–1689
- Henry Howard, 7th Duke of Norfolk 1689–1701

Since 1689, the position was held by the Lord Lieutenant of Berkshire. See that list for more modern post-holders.
