= William Cravens =

William Cravens may refer to:

- William B. Cravens (1872–1939), US Congressman from Arkansas
- William Fadjo Cravens (1899–1974), US Congressman from Arkansas, son of the above

See also

- William Craven (disambiguation) (similar name)
