= William Craven, 3rd Baron Craven =

English nobleman

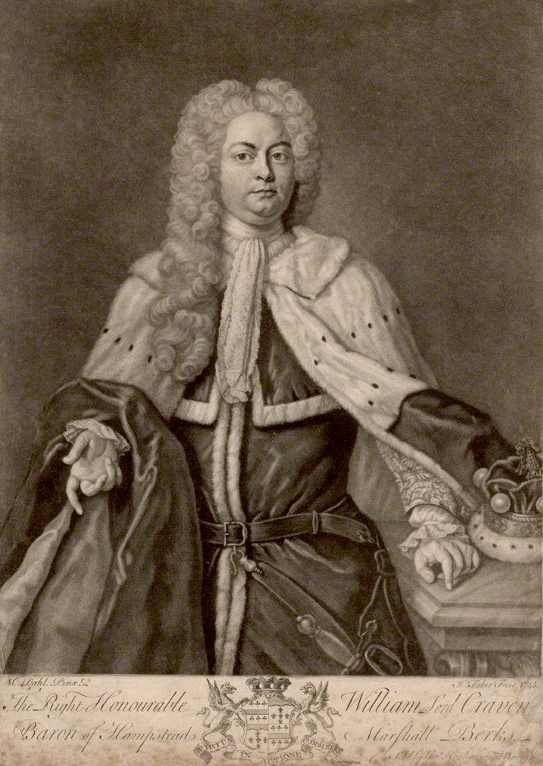
Lord Craven

William Craven, 3rd Baron Craven (1700 – 10 August 1739) was an English nobleman.

He inherited his father's title and estates at age eleven and made his home at Hamstead Marshall in Berkshire. He was educated in 1716 at St. John's College, Cambridge, Cambridgeshire, England. His great palace burnt down in 1718 and his dreams of rebuilding it came to nothing. He subsequently lived at Coombe Abbey, Coventry in Warwickshire. Lord Craven was involved in the formation of England's first charitable institution dedicated to the care of unwanted children, the Foundling Hospital. Although Craven never witnessed its formal beginnings, the charity was created through royal charter granted two months and one week after Craven's death, Craven is still listed on the charter as a founding Governor.

Peerage of England
Preceded by William Craven	Baron Craven; 1711–1739	Succeeded by Fulwar Craven
