= William Craven, 4th Earl of Craven =

British peer and Liberal politician (1868–1921)

The Right Honourable The Earl of Craven OBE
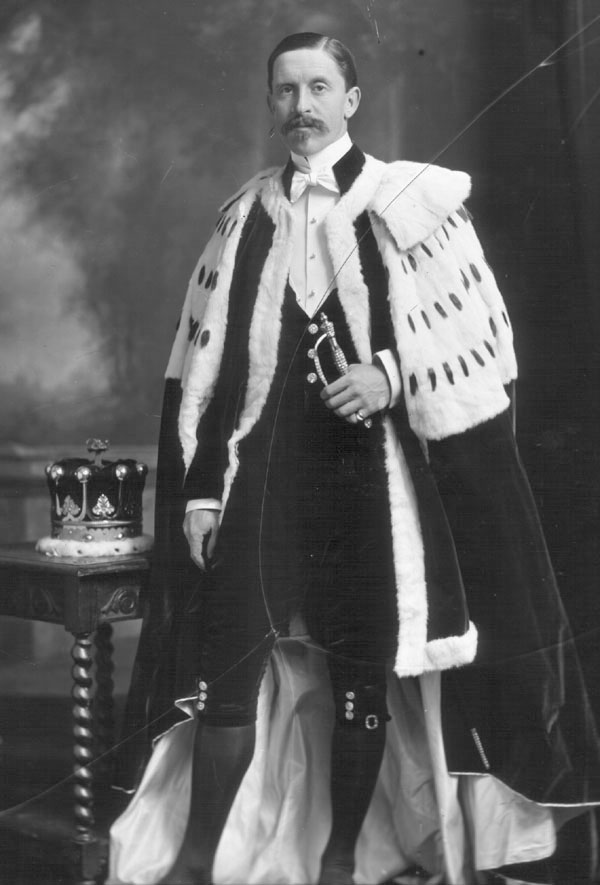
- Photograph of the Earl of Craven, 1902.

Lord Lieutenant of Warwickshire
- In office 1913–1921
- Preceded by: Marquess of Northampton
- Succeeded by: The Lord Leigh

Deputy Chief Whip of the House of Lords Captain of the Yeomen of the Guard
- In office 1911–1915
- Preceded by: The Lord Allendale
- Succeeded by: The Lord Suffield

Personal details
- Born: William George Robert Craven; 16 December 1868
- Died: 10 July 1921 (aged 52) Isle of Wight
- Cause of death: Drowning
- Spouse: Cornelia Martin (m. 1893)
- Relations: George Barrington, 7th Viscount Barrington (grandfather)
- Children: William Craven, 5th Earl of Craven
- Parent(s): George Craven; Evelyn Laura Barrington
- Education: Eton College

William George Robert Craven, 4th Earl of Craven OBE (16 December 1868 – 10 July 1921), styled Viscount Uffington from 1868 to 1883, was a British peer and Liberal politician.

== Early life ==
Craven was the eldest son of the George Craven, 3rd Earl of Craven (1841–1883), who served as Lord Lieutenant of Berkshire between 1881 and 1883, and his wife Hon. Evelyn Laura Barrington (1848–1924).

His father was the second son of nine children born to William Craven, 2nd Earl of Craven and Lady Emily Mary Grimston, herself the daughter of James Grimston, 1st Earl of Verulam. His grandfather also served as Lord Lieutenant of Warwickshire from 1853 to 1856. His paternal aunt, Lady Elizabeth Craven, married Arthur Egerton, 3rd Earl of Wilton, and another, Lady Blanche Craven, married George Coventry, 9th Earl of Coventry, and another, Lady Beatrix Jane Craven, married George Cadogan, 5th Earl Cadogan. His mother was the second daughter of George Barrington, 7th Viscount Barrington, who was a Member of Parliament for Eye and served as Captain of the Honourable Corps of Gentlemen-at-Arms and Captain of the Yeomen of the Guard under Queen Victoria in the 1880s. His maternal aunt, Constance Mary Barrington, was married to Lawrence Palk, 2nd Baron Haldon.

== Career ==
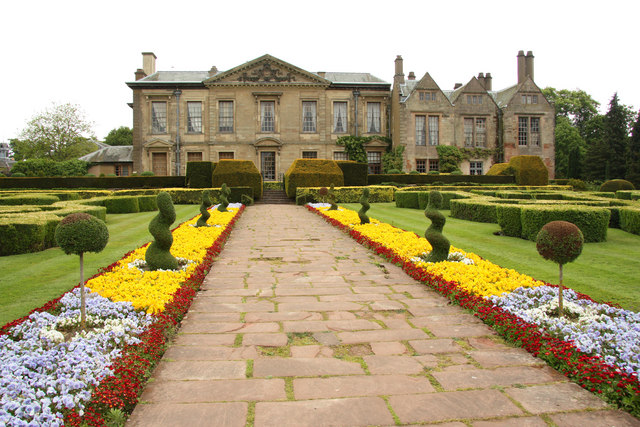
The Craven estate, Coombe Abbey

In 1883, at the age of fourteen, he succeeded his father as fourth Earl of Craven, the 5th Viscount Uffington, and the 10th Baron Craven of Hampsted Marshall. He was educated between 1882 and 1884 at Eton College in Eton near Windsor, England. He later took his seat on the Liberal benches in the House of Lords, and from 1890 and 1892, he served as aide-de-camp to the Viceroy of Ireland.

In 1911, he was appointed Captain of the Yeomen of the Guard in the Liberal administration of Prime Minister H. H. Asquith, a post he held until 1915. He was awarded the Order of the Crown of Belgium, the Chevalier, Ordre national de la Légion d'honneur, and in 1919, he was appointed Officer, Order of the British Empire.

From 1913 until his death in 1921, he was also Lord Lieutenant of Warwickshire.

== Personal life ==
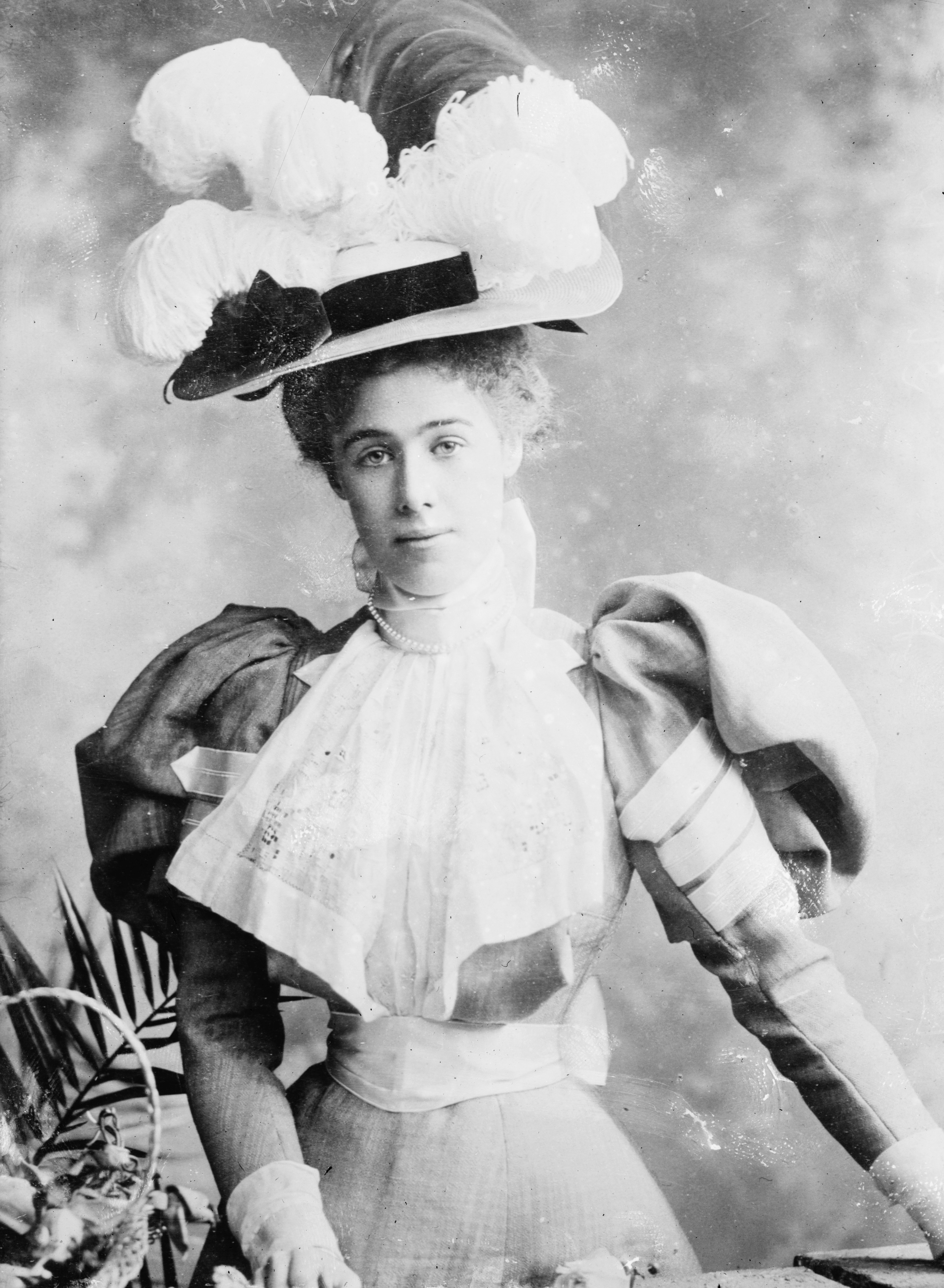
His wife, Cornelia, Countess of Craven.

On 18 April 1893, Lord Craven, then twenty-four years old, married sixteen-year-old Cornelia Martin (1877–1961) at Grace Church, New York City. Cornelia, who was the only daughter of Bradley Martin, a wealthy American banker, and his wife, Cornelia Sherman Martin, met Craven while her family was renting a Scottish highland estate, Balmacaan. The marriage brought him property in Mayfair and paid for the renovation of Coombe Abbey, his family estate in Warwickshire which got a new roof, structural repairs, and its first electric lights. Together, they were the parents of:

- William Craven, 5th Earl of Craven (1897–1932), who married Mary Williamina George, daughter of William George OBE, Town Clerk of Invergordon, on 14 October 1916.

In 1921, whilst racing at Cowes Week, and although a strong swimmer, Lord Craven fell overboard from his yacht Sylvia off the Isle of Wight and drowned at age 52. His body was washed ashore on 12 July 1921. He was succeeded in his titles by his son, William, Viscount Uffington upon his death in 1921.

After his death, his widow sold Coombe Abbey to a builder named John Grey in 1923, and died in 1961.

== Coat of arms ==
Coat of arms of William Craven, 4th Earl of Craven
Coronet A Coronet of an Earl Crest On a Chapeau Gules turned up Ermine a Griffin statant wings elevated Ermine beaked and foremembered Or Escutcheon Argent a Fess between six Cross Crosslets fitchée Gules Supporters On either side a Griffin wings elevated Ermine beaked and foremembered Or Motto Virtus in Actione Consistit (Virtue consists in action)

Political offices
Preceded by The Lord Allendale	Captain of the Yeomen of the Guard; 1911 – 1915	Succeeded by The Lord Suffield
Honorary titles
Preceded by The Marquess of Northampton	Lord Lieutenant of Warwickshire; 1913 – 1921	Succeeded by The Lord Leigh
Peerage of the United Kingdom
Preceded by George Craven	Earl of Craven; 1883 – 1921	Succeeded by William Craven
