= Bradley Martin =

American socialite (1841–1913)

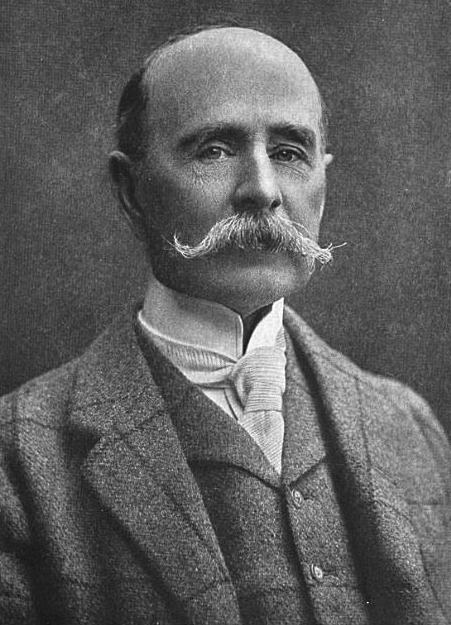
- Born: December 18, 1841; Albany, New York
- Died: February 5, 1913 (aged 71); London, England
- Education: Union University
- Spouse: Cornelia Sherman
- Children: 3
- Parent(s): Henry Hull Martin; Anna Townsend
- Relatives: Frederick Townsend Martin (brother); 4th Earl of Craven (son-in-law); 5th Earl of Craven (grandson)

Bradley Martin (December 18, 1841 – February 5, 1913) was an American socialite known for giving the Bradley-Martin costume ball at the Waldorf Hotel in New York City on the night of February 10, 1897.

== Early life ==
Martin was born on December 18, 1841, in Albany, New York. He was the son of Henry Hull Martin (1809–1886) and Anna Townsend Martin (1815–1866). His siblings included Frederick Townsend Martin (1849–1914), writer and advocate for the poor, and Henry Townsend Martin (d. 1915).

His maternal grandfather was Solomon Townsend, a prominent merchant who was from an old Albany family that was related to the Long Island Townsends. His father was a prominent banker and merchant and the family was involved in Albany society. His ancestor, John Martin, accompanied Sir Francis Drake in his famous voyage around the world in 1580.

Martin was educated at Union University and was a First lieutenant in the 93rd Regiment, National Guard of New York, part of the Union Army during the American Civil War. He later served as aide-de-camp to Gov. Reuben Fenton.

== Society life ==
In 1884, Martin leased Balmacaan, a well known game preserve in parish of Urguhart, Inverness-shire Scotland, a mile from Drumnadrochit, from Lady Seafield. From that point on, they generally lived there except for the few months, generally during the Winters, they spent in New York. Martin was a member of the Union Club.

In January 1885, the Martins gave a ball for the "Four Hundred" invited guests at their residence, which was considered, with the exception of the Vanderbilt "fancy dress ball of 1883", the most unique and beautiful entertainment ever enjoyed by the members of New York Society. They gave another ball, on February 8, 1890, for 300 friends at Delmonico's followed by a cotillion.

When his daughter married the Earl of Craven in 1893, the press reported that: "The British lion captured another American prize yesterday, and $1,000,000 more of Yankee money has gone to swell English exchequers."

=== Bradley-Martin Ball ===
On February 10, 1897, the Bradley Martins threw their most famous ball, the Bradley-Martin costume ball at the Waldorf Hotel. His wife organized the ball, intending it to be "the greatest party in the history of the city". 800 of New York's elite Society spent about $400,000 imitating kings and queens. It has been called "The most ostentatious party in US history."

The Bradley-Martins stated that their goal was to create an economic stimulus for New York City, which was at the end of an economic slump which began in 1873 and included the Panic of 1893. Many prominent preachers and writers argued over the propriety of a party that would cost hundreds of thousands of dollars. In the end, the ball was judged a social triumph but negative publicity.

== Personal life ==
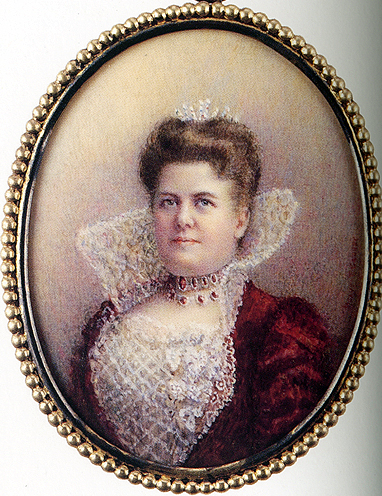
A Cameo of Cornelia Sherman Martin dressed as Mary Stuart, Queen of Scots, for the Ball.

Martin met his future wife, Cornelia Sherman (1843–1920), at the wedding of Emily Vanderbilt, second daughter of William H. Vanderbilt, to William Sloane, where she was one of Vanderbilt's bridesmaids. The couple courted, were soon engaged, and were married about a year later. Cornelia was the only child and heir of Isaac Sherman (d. 1881), a retired merchant who lived on West Twentieth Street in New York and was close friends with Abraham Lincoln. Together, they were the parents of three children:

- Sherman Martin (1869–1894), who died aged 25 in New York of apoplexy, but rumors at the time indicated it was suicide. He was married to Annie Nunn, an English girl.
- Bradley Martin, Jr. (1873–1963), who married Helen Margaret Phipps (1876–1934), a daughter of Henry Phipps, Jr., in 1904.
- Cornelia Martin (1877–1961), who married William Craven, 4th Earl of Craven (1868–1921), son of George Craven, 3rd Earl of Craven and grandson of George Barrington, 7th Viscount Barrington, in 1893.

Martin died of influenza, which developed into pneumonia, on February 5, 1913, in London, England. At his death, his New York estate was valued at $1,277,341. The foreign estate was not valued as Martin took up permanent residence in England in 1899. His widow died at her country residence at Hamstead Marshall, England on October 24, 1920. The Martin estate, which was left equally to his daughter and living son, was valued at $4,412,404 upon his wife's death in 1920.

=== Descendants ===
Through his daughter, he was the maternal grandfather of William George Bradley Craven, 5th Earl of Craven (1897–1932).
