= Earl of Craven =

Earldom in the Peerage of the United Kingdom

Earl of Craven 2nd Creation
- Arms of Craven, Earls of Craven: Argent, a Fess between six Crosses-Crosslet fitchée Gules. Crest: On a Chapeau Gules, turned up Ermine, a Griffin statant wings elevated Ermine, beaked and fore-membered Or. Supporters: On either side a Griffin wings elevated Ermine, beaked and fore-membered Or.
- Creation date: 18 June 1801
- Creation: Second
- Created by: King George III
- First holder: William Craven, 1st Earl of Craven
- Present holder: Benjamin Craven, 9th Earl of Craven
- Subsidiary titles: Viscount Uffington; Baron Craven
- Status: Extant
- Former seats: Ashdown Park; Coombe Abbey
- Motto: VIRTUS IN ACTIONE CONSISTIT (Virtue consists in action)

Earl of Craven 1st Creation
- Creation date: 16 March 1664/5
- Creation: First
- Created by: Charles II
- First holder: William Craven, 1st Earl of Craven
- Last holder: William Craven, 1st Earl of Craven
- Subsidiary titles: Viscount Craven; Baron Craven (1626/7); Baron Craven (1666)
- Status: Extinct
- Extinction date: 9 April 1697
- Arms as 2nd Creation

Earl of Craven, in the County of York, is a title that has been created twice, once in the Peerage of England and once in the Peerage of the United Kingdom.

== History ==
The first creation came in the Peerage of England in 1664 in favour of the soldier William Craven, 1st Baron Craven, the eldest son of Sir William Craven, who served as Lord Mayor of London in 1610. He was made Viscount Craven, of Uffington in the County of Berkshire, at the same time. Both titles were created with remainder to his kinsmen Sir William Craven and Sir Anthony Craven. Craven had already in 1627 been created Baron Craven, of Hamstead Marshall in the County of Berkshire, with remainder to his brothers John (later Baron Craven of Ryton) and Thomas. In 1665 he was also created Baron Craven, of Hamstead Marshall in the County of Berkshire, with remainder to his kinsman Sir William Craven, the son of Thomas Craven, who was the brother of the aforementioned Sir Anthony Craven. Thomas Craven was the grandson of Henry Craven, brother of the aforementioned Sir William Craven, father of the first Earl.

=== Baron Craven ===
On the Earl of Craven's death in 1697, the barony of 1627 and the viscountcy and earldom became extinct. However, he was succeeded in the barony of 1665 according to the special remainder by his kinsman William Craven, the second Baron. He was the son of the aforesaid Sir William Craven, son of Thomas Craven. Lord Craven notably served as Lord Lieutenant of Berkshire. On the death of his younger son, the fourth Baron, the line of the second Baron failed. The late Baron was succeeded by his first cousin, the fifth Baron. He was the son of the Honourable John Craven, the younger brother of the second Baron. Lord Craven had earlier represented Warwickshire in the House of Commons. On his death, the title passed to his nephew, the sixth Baron, the son of Reverend John Craven. He served as Lord Lieutenant of Berkshire.

=== Earl of Craven, 2nd Creation ===
His eldest son, the seventh Baron and first Earl, was a Major-General in the Army, and also served as Lord Lieutenant of Berkshire. In 1801, he was created Viscount Uffington, in the County of Berkshire, and Earl of Craven, in the County of York, in the Peerage of the United Kingdom. This first Earl is not entirely forgotten – Harriette Wilson begins her famous memoir, "I shall not say why and how I became, at the age of fifteen, the mistress of the Earl of Craven." He was succeeded by his son, the second Earl. He was Lord Lieutenant of Warwickshire. His son, the third Earl, was briefly Lord Lieutenant of Berkshire. His son, the fourth Earl, was a Liberal politician and served as Captain of the Yeomen of the Guard in the Liberal administration of H. H. Asquith. As of 2010 the titles are held by his great-great-grandson, the ninth Earl, who succeeded his father in 1990 (who in his turn had succeeded his elder brother in 1983).

The courtesy title of the Earl's eldest son is Viscount Uffington.

=== Other family members ===
Another member of the Craven family was the traveller Keppel Richard Craven (1779–1851). He was the third and youngest son of the sixth Baron Craven. Also, Louisa, Countess of Craven (1785–1860), wife of the first Earl of the 1801 creation, was a well-known actress.

=== Family seat ===
The current family seat is Hawkwood House near Waldron, East Sussex. Previous family seats have included Hamstead Marshall Park and Lodge and Ashdown Park in Berkshire, and Coombe Abbey in Warwickshire. William Craven, 6th Baron Craven built Craven Cottage in 1780, later to become the home of Fulham F.C. In Italy, in Varese, they lived at Villa Craven di Seyssel d'Aix starting from the mid-19th century.

== Earls of Craven, first creation (1664) ==
- William Craven, 1st Earl of Craven, 1st Baron Craven (1608–1697)

== Barons Craven (1626; reverted) ==
- William Craven, 2nd Baron Craven (1668–1711)
- William Craven, 3rd Baron Craven (1700–1739)
- Fulwar Craven, 4th Baron Craven (died 1764)
- William Craven, 5th Baron Craven (1705–1769)
- William Craven, 6th Baron Craven (1738–1791)
- William Craven, 7th Baron Craven (1770–1825) (created Earl of Craven in 1801)

== Earls of Craven, second creation (1801) ==
- William Craven, 1st Earl of Craven (1770–1825)
- William Craven, 2nd Earl of Craven (1809–1866)
- George Grimston Craven, 3rd Earl of Craven (1841–1883)
- William George Robert Craven, 4th Earl of Craven (1868–1921)
- William George Bradley Craven, 5th Earl of Craven (1897–1932)
- William Robert Bradley Craven, 6th Earl of Craven (1917–1965)
- Thomas Robert Douglas Craven, 7th Earl of Craven (24 August 1957 – 22 October 1983). Craven was the eldest son of the 6th Earl. He was styled Viscount Uffington until 1965. He succeeded his father in the earldom in 1965. He committed suicide in his mother's house in 1983. He left a legacy to his illegitimate son Thomas Roderick Craven, while his title passed to his brother Simon Craven, 8th Earl of Craven. The Craven estate at Hamstead Marshall was sold after his death.
- Simon George Craven, 8th Earl of Craven (1961–1990). Craven was the second son of the 6th Earl and the younger brother of the 7th Earl. He was a student nurse who died in a road accident in 1990.
- Benjamin Robert Joseph Craven, 9th Earl of Craven (born 1989)

== Present peer ==
Benjamin Robert Joseph Craven, 9th Earl of Craven (born 13 June 1989) is the only son of the 8th Earl and his wife Teresa Maria Bernadette Downes, a daughter of Arthur John Downes, of Black Hall, Clane, County Kildare, Ireland. On 30 August 1990 he succeeded his father as Earl of Craven, Viscount Uffington, and Baron Craven. In 2003 he was living with his mother at Hawkwood House, Waldron, East Sussex.

The heir presumptive, the only person who was in the line of succession to the earldom, was the present holder's first cousin three times removed, Lt.-Cdr. Rupert José Evelyn Craven (22 March 1926 – 11 May 2025), only son of Rupert Cecil Craven (1870–1959), the second son of the third earl. He was married, but had no issue; after him, the sole remaining heir to the Craven barony is the present Earl's seventh cousin thrice removed, John Edmund Craven (born 1946), a fifth-great-grandson of Charles Craven, the youngest brother of the second Baron.

== Coat of arms ==
Coat of arms of Earl of Craven
Coronet A Coronet of an Earl Crest On a Chapeau Gules turned up Ermine a Griffin statant wings elevated Ermine beaked and foremembered Or Escutcheon Argent a Fess between six Cross Crosslets fitchée Gules Supporters On either side a Griffin wings elevated Ermine beaked and foremembered Or Motto Virtus In Actione Consistit (Virtue consists in action)

== See also ==
- Baron Craven of Ryton
