= William Craven, 2nd Baron Craven =

English nobleman (1668–1711)

William Craven, 2nd Baron Craven (24 October 1668 – 9 October 1711) was an English nobleman.

He was born in the old house at Benham Park at Speen in Berkshire, the son of Sir William Craven, a grandson of a cousin of William Craven, 1st Earl of Craven. He was appointed Lord Lieutenant of Berkshire in 1702, a position he held until his death in 1711. He sat as a Tory in the House of Lords and was a founding member of the Loyal Brotherhood in 1709. His main residence was Coombe Abbey, near Coventry in Warwickshire.

Craven was Lord Palatine of the province of Carolina from 1708–1711. On his death, Craven was succeeded by his son William, as third Baron Craven.

Honorary titles
| Preceded by The Earl of Abingdon | Lord Lieutenant of Berkshire; 1702–1711 | Succeeded by The Duke of Northumberland |
Peerage of England
| Preceded by William Craven | Baron Craven; 1697–1711 | Succeeded by William Craven |
