= William Craven, 1st Earl of Craven (British Army officer) =

British soldier (1770–1825)

Lieutenant-General The Right Honourable The Earl of Craven
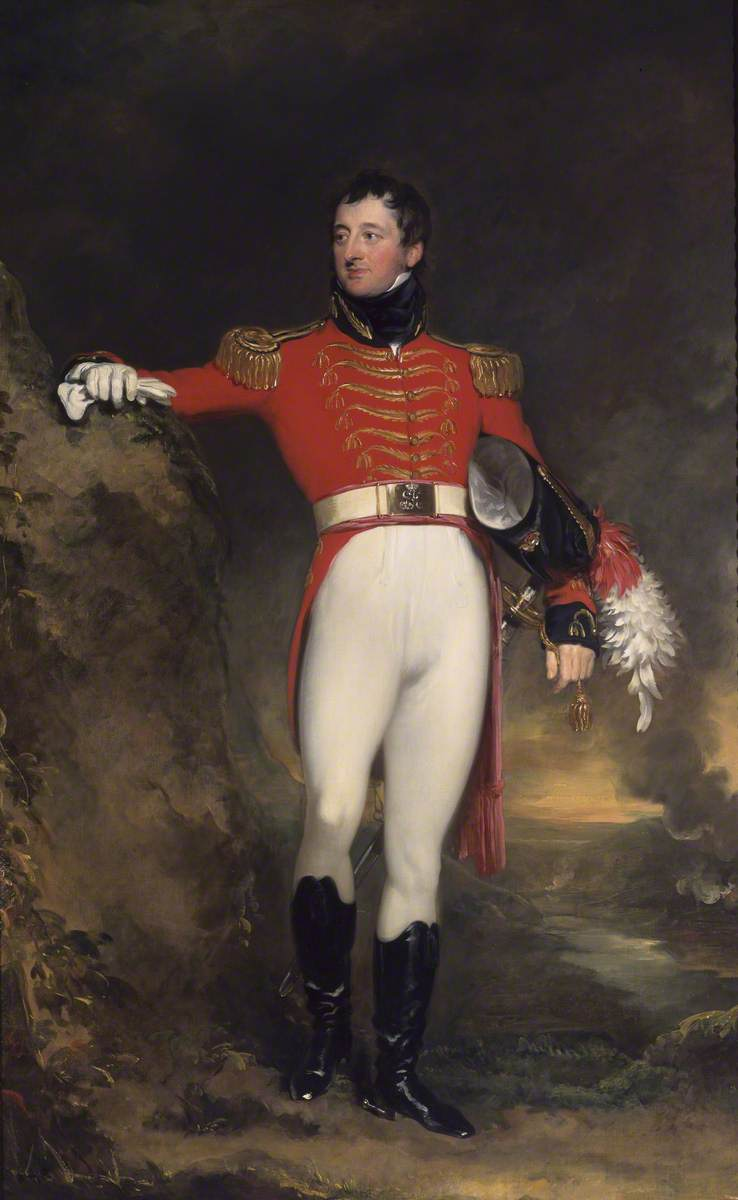
- Portrait by Sir Thomas Lawrence, c. 1815

Lord Lieutenant of Berkshire
- In office 1819–1825
- Preceded by: The Earl of Radnor
- Succeeded by: The Earl of Abingdon

Personal details
- Born: William Craven; 28 September 1770 London
- Died: 30 July 1825 (aged 54) Cowes, Isle of Wight
- Spouse: Louisa Brunton (m. 1807)
- Children: 4
- Parent(s): William Craven, 6th Baron Craven; Lady Elizabeth Berkeley

Military service
- Years of service: 1793–1825
- Rank: Lieutenant-General
- Battles/wars: French Revolutionary Wars; Flanders Campaign; Siege of Nijmegan; West Indies Campaign; Capture of Trinidad; Anglo-Russian Invasion of Holland; Napoleonic Wars

Lieutenant-General William Craven, 1st Earl of Craven (28 September 1770 – 30 July 1825) was a British Army officer, courtier, and Lord Lieutenant of Berkshire.

== Early life ==
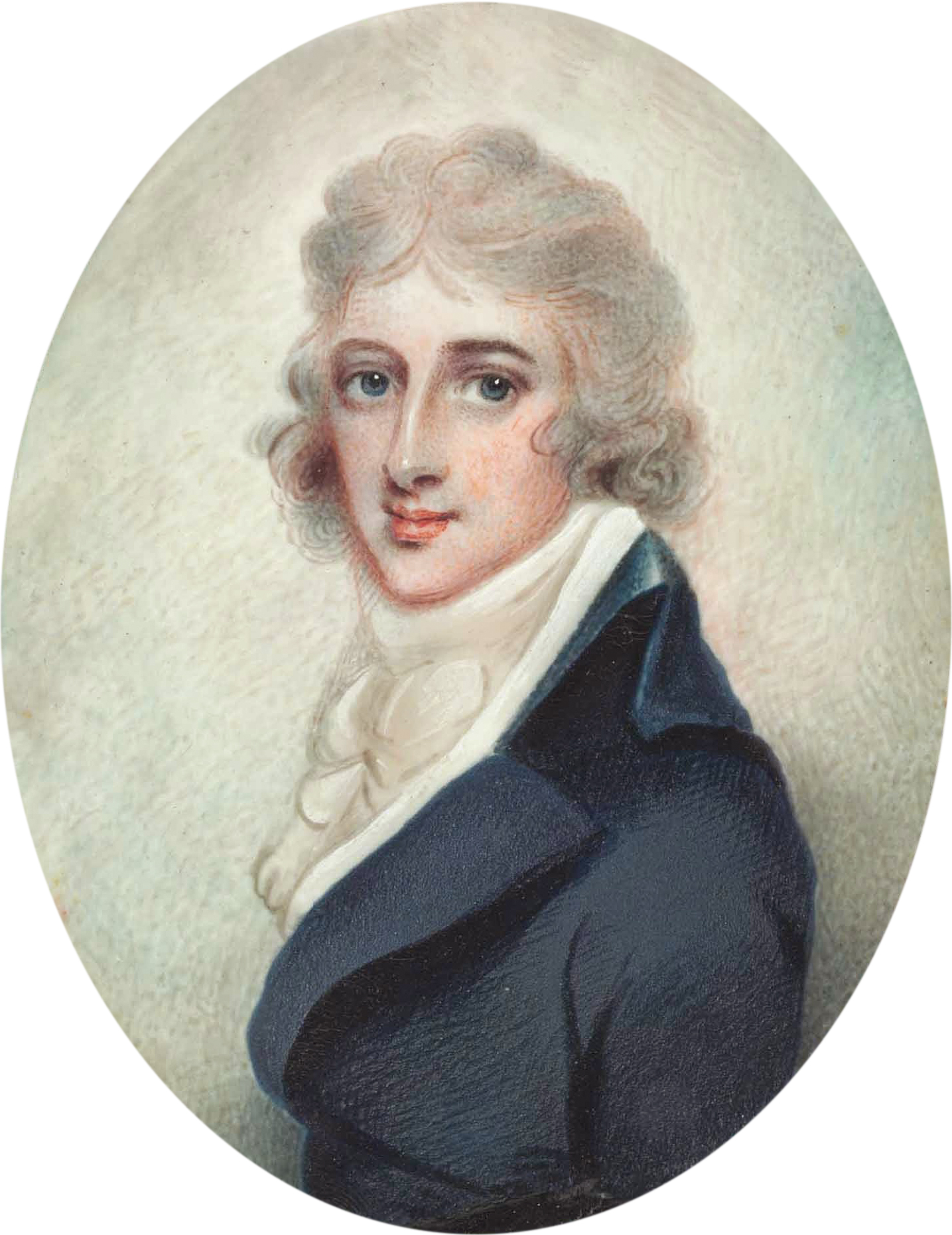
William Craven, 1st Earl of Craven, by Anne Mee née Foldsone.

Craven was the eldest son of William Craven, 6th Baron Craven, and his wife Lady Elizabeth Berkeley. Among his siblings was Maria Craven (wife of William Molyneux, 2nd Earl of Sefton) and Arabella Craven (wife of General the Hon. Frederick St John). In 1780, after thirteen years of marriage, and reported affairs on both sides, his parents parted permanently. After the death of his father in 1791, his mother married Charles Alexander, Margrave of Brandenburg-Ansbach. Charles' wife, Princess Frederica Caroline of Saxe-Coburg-Saalfeld, also died earlier in 1791.

His paternal grandfather was the Rev. John Craven, brother of William Craven, 5th Baron Craven, who his father succeeded as Baron Craven in 1769. His maternal grandparents were Augustus Berkeley, 4th Earl of Berkeley and the former Elizabeth Drax (a daughter of Henry Drax).

== Career ==
He succeeded his father as seventh Baron Craven in 1791. In 1801 he was created Viscount Uffington, in the County of Berkshire, and Earl of Craven, in the County of York. The earldom was a revival of the title held by his 17th-century kinsman and namesake William Craven, 1st Earl of Craven.

He was commissioned into the 43rd (Monmouthshire) Regiment of Foot in 1793, and subsequently served with the 80th and commissioned as major in the 84th Regiments. In 1798, Craven was appointed aide-de-camp to King George III, serving until 1805. This was followed by active service in the Netherlands and the Mediterranean, ultimately achieving the rank of Lieutenant-general.

From 1819 until his death in 1825, Lord Craven served as Lord Lieutenant of Berkshire and was opposed to Catholic emancipation.

== Marriage and issue ==
In 1807, Craven married Louisa Brunton, a famous actress. Louisa was a daughter of John Brunton, a grocer who later became an actor and manager of the Norwich Theatre. She was one of seven sisters, several were actresses, one, Ann Brunton Merry married the poet and dilettante Robert Merry.

Together, they were the parents of:

- William Craven, 2nd Earl of Craven (1809–1866), who married Lady Emily Mary Grimston, the second daughter of James Grimston, 1st Earl of Verulam.
- Hon. George Augustus Craven (1810–1836), an Army Officer who married Georgina Smythe (1814-1868), a daughter of Walter Smythe. Georgina's aunt (Walter's sister), Maria, was a longtime companion of George IV before he became king. After Craven's death, Georgina married Edmond, Duc de la Force.
- Hon. Frederick Keppel Craven (1812–1864), a prominent cricketer.
- Lady Louisa Elizabeth Craven (d. 1858), who married Sir Frederick Johnstone, 7th Baronet. After his death, she married Alexander Oswald, a Member of Parliament for Ayrshire.

Lord Craven mostly resided at Coombe Abbey, near Coventry in Warwickshire and occasionally at Hamstead Marshall in Berkshire. He is not entirely forgotten – Harriette Wilson begins her famous memoir, "I shall not say why and how I became, at the age of fifteen, the mistress of the Earl of Craven."

He died in July 1825, aged 54, and was succeeded in his titles by his son William.

Coat of arms of William Craven, 1st Earl of Craven
Coronet A Coronet of an Earl Crest On a Chapeau Gules turned up Ermine a Griffin statant wings elevated Ermine beaked and foremembered Or Escutcheon Argent a Fess between six Cross Crosslets fitchée Gules Supporters On either side a Griffin wings elevated Ermine beaked and foremembered Or Motto Virtus in Actione Consistit (Virtue consists in action)

Honorary titles
Preceded by The Earl of Radnor	Lord Lieutenant of Berkshire; 1819–1825	Succeeded by The Earl of Abingdon
Peerage of the United Kingdom
New creation	Earl of Craven; 1801–1825	Succeeded by William Craven
Peerage of England
Preceded by William Craven	Baron Craven; 1791–1825	Succeeded by William Craven
