= John Craven, 1st Baron Craven of Ryton =

English peer (1610–1648)

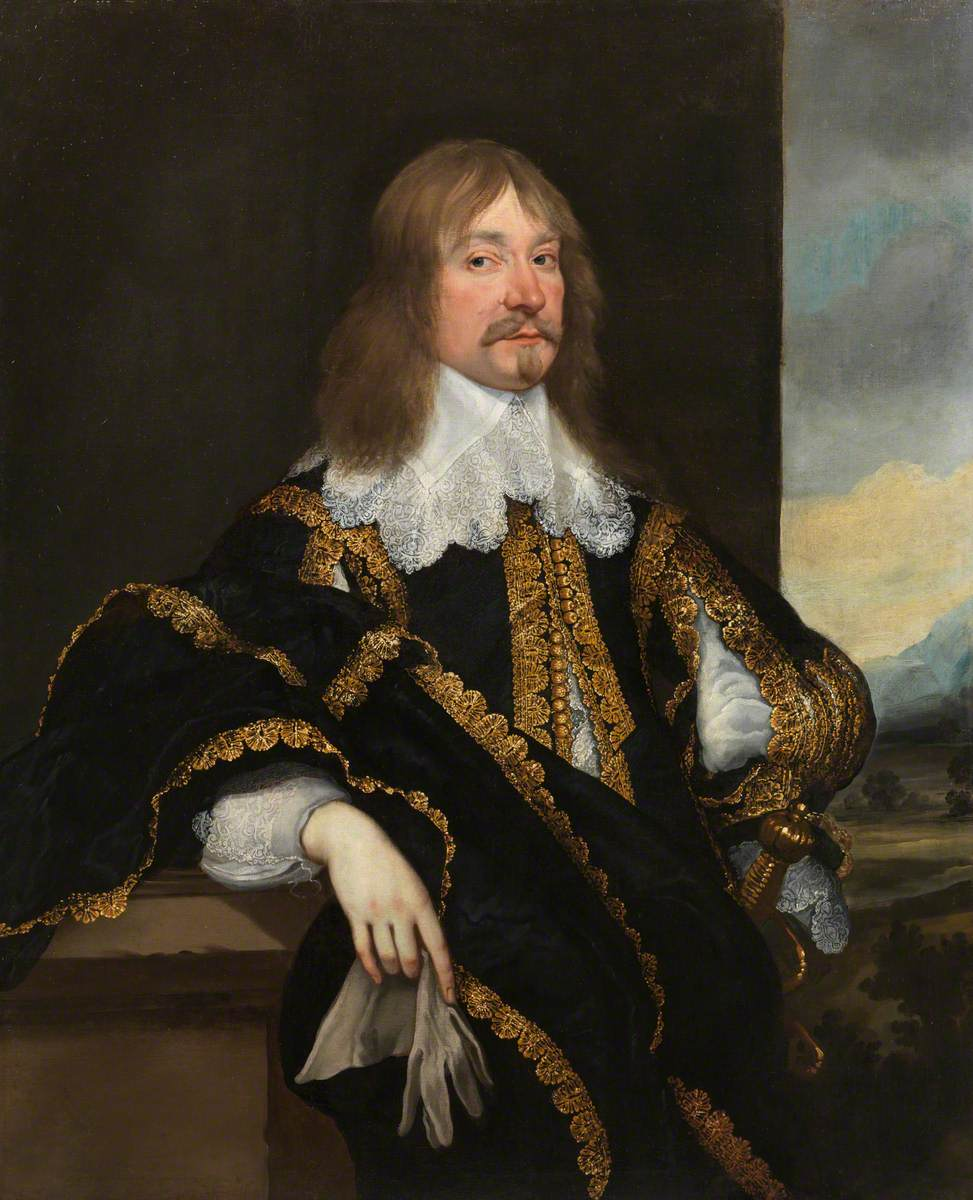

John Craven, 1st Baron Craven of Ryton (baptised 10 June 1610 at St Andrew Undershaft, London – 1648), was an English peer and founder of the Craven scholarships at Oxford and Cambridge.

== Background ==
Craven was the younger surviving son of Sir William Craven, Lord Mayor of London in 1610 and his wife Elizabeth Whitmore, daughter of William Whitmore. William Craven, 1st Earl of Craven (1608–1697), was his elder brother.

== Political career ==
Craven was elected Member of Parliament in the Long Parliament for Tewkesbury in November 1640 in an election which was declared void on 6 August 1641. In 1643 he was raised to the peerage as Baron Craven of Ryton by Charles I, who held him in high regard.

== Family ==
Lord Craven of Ryton married Elizabeth, daughter of William Spencer, 2nd Baron Spencer of Wormleighton and granddaughter through her mother Penelope of Henry Wriothesley, 3rd Earl of Southampton, in 1643. He was childless and the title became extinct on his death in 1648.

== Craven scholarships ==
Craven was noted for benevolence, and his will contained numerous charitable bequests. The most significant was the bequest of his manor of Cancerne, Sussex, for the endowment of four poor scholars, two at Oxford University and two at Cambridge University. The Craven scholarships still exist.

Peerage of England
New creation	Baron Craven of Ryton; 1643–1648	Extinct
