= Lord Lieutenant of Berkshire =

Monarch's representative in English county

This is a list of people who have served as Lord Lieutenant of Berkshire. Since 1689, all Lords Lieutenant have also been Custos Rotulorum of Berkshire.

== Lord-Lieutenants of Berkshire ==
- Charles Brandon, 1st Duke of Suffolk 1545–22 August 1545
- Edward Seymour, 1st Duke of Somerset 10 May 1551 – 22 January 1552
- William Parr, 1st Marquess of Northampton 1552–?
- Sir William FitzWilliam 1559
- Henry Norris, 1st Baron Norreys 17 September 1586 – 27 June 1601 jointly with
- Sir Francis Knollys 12 September 1586 – 19 July 1596 and
- William Knollys, 1st Earl of Banbury 4 November 1596 – 25 May 1632 jointly with
- Henry Rich, 1st Earl of Holland 28 March 1628 – 23 August 1643 (Parliamentary from 1642)
- Interregnum
- John Lovelace, 2nd Baron Lovelace 28 August 1660 – 25 November 1670
- Prince Rupert of the Rhine 7 November 1670 – 29 November 1682
- Henry Howard, 7th Duke of Norfolk 16 December 1682 – 2 April 1701
- Montagu Venables-Bertie, 2nd Earl of Abingdon 12 May 1701 – 11 June 1702
- William Craven, 2nd Baron Craven 11 June 1702 – 9 October 1711
- George FitzRoy, 1st Duke of Northumberland 15 May 1712 – 12 November 1714
- Charles Beauclerk, 1st Duke of St Albans 12 November 1714 – 10 May 1726
- Charles Beauclerk, 2nd Duke of St Albans 4 March 1727 – 27 July 1751
- George Beauclerk, 3rd Duke of St Albans 30 October 1751 – 18 March 1761
- Vere Beauclerk, 1st Baron Vere 18 March 1761 – 16 July 1771
- George Beauclerk, 3rd Duke of St Albans 16 July 1771 – 1 February 1786
- William Craven, 6th Baron Craven 1786–26 September 1791
- Jacob Pleydell-Bouverie, 2nd Earl of Radnor 1791–9 December 1819
- William Craven, 1st Earl of Craven 9 December 1819 – 30 July 1825
- Montagu Bertie, 5th Earl of Abingdon 27 April 1826 – 16 October 1854
- Montagu Bertie, 6th Earl of Abingdon 13 February 1854 – 7 September 1881
- George Craven, 3rd Earl of Craven 7 September 1881 – 7 December 1883
- Ernest Brudenell-Bruce, 3rd Marquess of Ailesbury 16 January 1884 – 18 October 1886
- Robert Loyd-Lindsay, 1st Baron Wantage 12 November 1886 – 10 June 1901 (deceased)
- James Herbert Benyon 26 August 1901 – 14 February 1935
- Arthur Loyd 22 March 1935 – 8 November 1944
- Sir Henry Benyon, 1st Baronet 28 March 1945 – 15 June 1959
- David John Smith 30 September 1959 – 1976
- John Smith 5 March 1976 – 16 March 1978
- Gordon William Nottage Palmer 16 March 1978 – 1989
- John Ronald (Johnny) Henderson 4 September 1989 – 9 May 1995
- Sir Philip Wroughton 9 May 1995 – 19 April 2008
- Mary Bayliss 19 April 2008 – 14 January 2015
- James Puxley 15 January 2015 – 23 October 2023
- Andrew Try 23 October 2023–To date

== Vice Lord Lieutenants ==
The Lord-Lieutenant appoints one Vice Lord-Lieutenant for the county. This appointment ceases when the Lord-Lieutenant retires.

- Captain Edward Beaumont from Ascot, Appointed 9 November 1989
- Sir William Benyon of Englefield, 1994–2005
- Lady Elizabeth Godsal, Retired 04 Jan 2011
- James Puxley of Welford Park, Appointed 04 Jan 2011–2015
- Anthony West of Remenham, Appointed 2015
- Jeffrey Branch of Maidenhead, Appointed 2016, retired 4 August 2020
- Graham Barker of Bray, Appointed 5 August 2020.

== Current Deputy Lieutenants ==
Deputy Lieutenants traditionally support the Lord-Lieutenant. There are several deputy lieutenants at any time, depending on the population of the county. Their appointment does not terminate with the changing of the Lord-Lieutenant, but they usually retire at age 75. Berkshire currently (February 2023) has 35 Deputy Lieutenants in addition to the Lord-Lieutenant and Vice Lord-Lieutenant.

- Dr Christina Hill-Williams, appointed 27 July 2005
- Professor Susanna Rose, appointed 4 December 2007
- Paul Dick, appointed 8 March 2010
- Harry Henderson, appointed 8 March 2010
- Hugo Vickers, appointed 8 March 2010
- Sarah Scrope, appointed 22 June 2011
- Zoë Smith, appointed 22 June 2011
- Simon Carter, appointed 9 March 2012
- General Sir Charles Watt, appointed 9 March 2012
- Charles Brims, appointed 29 May 2013
- Khan Juna, appointed 29 May 2013
- Brigadier Stephen Matthews, appointed 29 May 2013
- Willie Russell, appointed 1 Sep 2016 High Sheriff 2021-22.
- Kiren Sharma, appointed 1 Sep 2016
- Felicity Rutland, appointed 1 Sep 2016.
- Christopher Barrett, appointed 12 Jan 2018
- Richard Bennett, appointed 12 Jan 2018
- David Brownlow, Baron Brownlow of Shurlock Row, appointed 12 Jan 2018
- Dr Peter Durrant, appointed 12 Jan 2018
- Sean Taylor, appointed 12 Jan 2018
- Richard Anderson, appointed 17 Oct 2019
- Lt Col Sir Alexander Matheson, appointed 17 Oct 2019
- Harriet McCalmont, appointed 17 Oct 2019
- Andrew Try, appointed 17 Oct 2019
- Lindsey Beard, appointed 22 June 2021
- Carol Jackson-Doerge, appointed 22 June 2021
- Geraldine Lejeune, appointed 22 June 2021
- Lucy Zeal, appointed 22 June 2021
- Stefan Fafinski, appointed 17 February 2023
- Tanweer Ikram, appointed 17 February 2023
- Chris Juden, appointed 17 February 2023
- Susan Roberts, appointed 17 February 2023
- Mark Sanderson, appointed 17 February 2023
- Rohit Tanna, appointed 17 February 2023
- Julian Walker, appointed 17 February 2023

== Previous Deputy Lieutenants ==
A deputy lieutenant of Berkshire is commissioned by the Lord Lieutenant of Berkshire. Deputy lieutenants support the work of the lord-lieutenant. There can be several deputy lieutenants at any time, depending on the population of the county. Their appointment does not terminate with the changing of the lord-lieutenant, but they usually retire at age 75.

=== 18th Century ===
- 20 August 1799: John Willes
- 20 August 1799: James Croft
- 20 August 1799: John Huddleston
- 20 August 1799: Thomas William Ravenshaw
- Ramnik Saund to supplementary list Jan 2022
- Chris Khoo appointed 1 Sep 2016 Deceased 1 November 2022
