= William Craven, 2nd Earl of Craven =

British peer

The Right Honourable The Earl of Craven DL
- 1830 portrait

Lord Lieutenant of Warwickshire
- In office 1853–1856
- Preceded by: The Earl of Warwick
- Succeeded by: The Lord Leigh

Personal details
- Born: William Craven; 18 August 1809
- Died: 25 August 1866 (aged 57)
- Spouse: Lady Emily Grimston (m. 1835)
- Children: 9
- Parent(s): William Craven, 1st Earl of Craven; Louisa Brunton
- Education: Christ Church, Oxford

William Craven, 2nd Earl of Craven DL (18 August 1809 – 25 August 1866), styled Viscount Uffington until 1825, was a British peer.

== Early life ==
William Craven was born on 18 August 1809. He was the eldest son of William Craven, 1st Earl of Craven and the former Louisa Brunton, an actress. Among his siblings were brothers, Hon. George Augustus Craven, an Army officer, and Hon. Frederick Keppel Craven, a prominent cricketer. His sister, Lady Louisa Elizabeth Craven, was married twice, first to Sir Frederick Johnstone, 7th Baronet, and secondly to Alexander Oswald, a Member of Parliament for Ayrshire.

His paternal grandparents were William Craven, 6th Baron Craven, and his wife Lady Elizabeth Berkeley (a daughter of Augustus Berkeley, 4th Earl of Berkeley). His maternal grandfather was John Brunton, a grocer who later became an actor and manager of the Norwich Theatre. His mother was the youngest of six sisters, one of whom, Ann Brunton Merry, was also an actress, and married poet and dilettante Robert Merry.

He was educated at Christ Church, Oxford.

== Career ==
Upon his father's death in 1825, he succeeded to the earldom of Craven, and the family estate, Combe Abbey. He gave the architect W. Eden Nesfield his first important commission, which was to build a new wing to Combe Abbey.

Craven was commissioned as a captain in the Royal Berkshire Militia on 14 February 1829, but resigned on 18 March 1831. He was appointed a Deputy Lieutenant of Warwickshire on 11 January 1831 and of Berkshire on 20 October 1831. He was appointed Lord Lieutenant of Warwickshire in 1853, and held the office until 1856, when he resigned due to ill health. Lord Craven also served as Recorder of Coventry and High Steward of Newbury.

Lord Craven was the owner of the racehorse Charity which won the 1841 Grand National and a pioneer of photography.

== Personal life ==
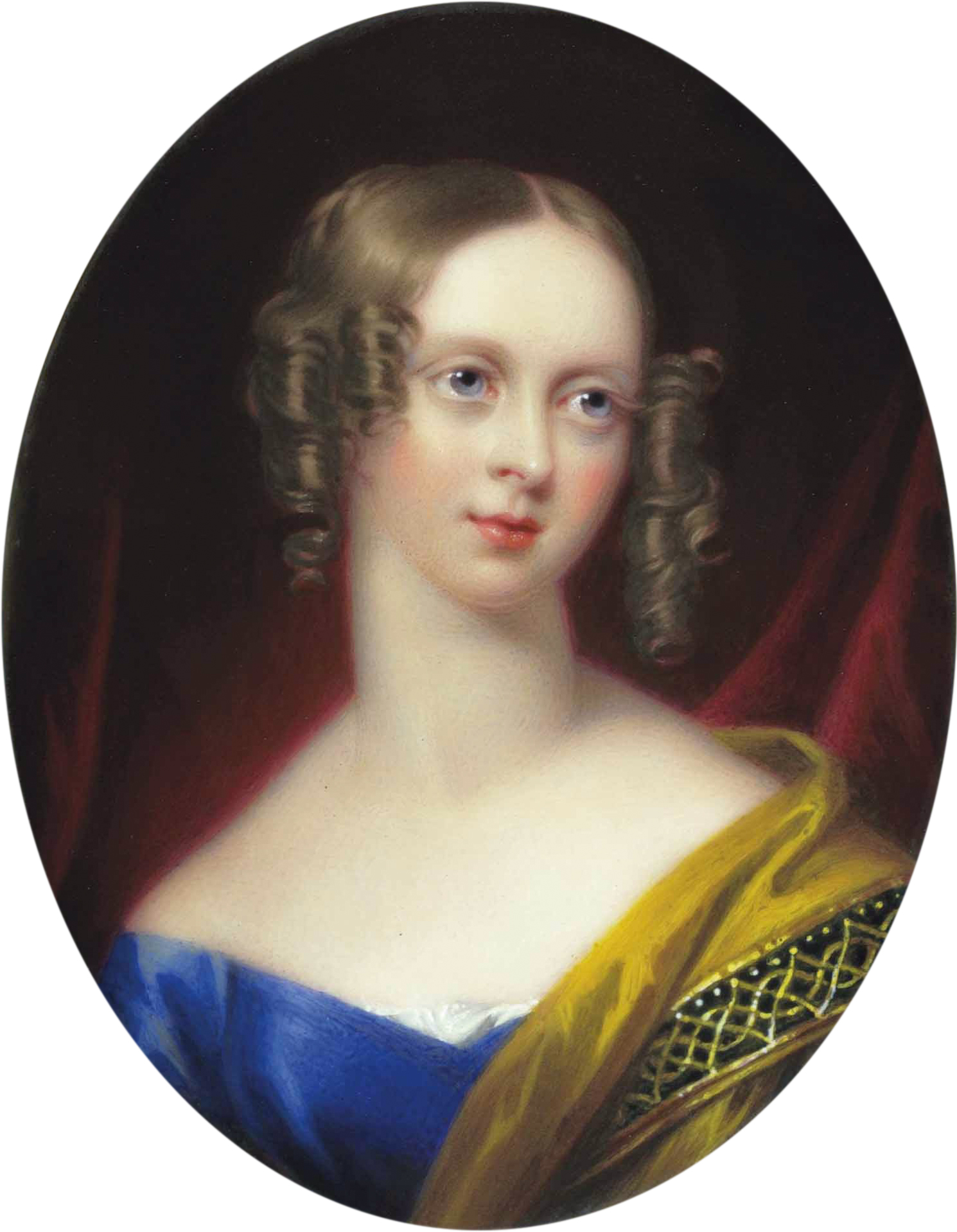
Lady Emily Mary, Countess of Craven, née Grimston, (Henry Pierce Bone)

On 5 September 1835, Lord Craven was married to Lady Emily Mary Grimston, daughter of James Grimston, 1st Earl of Verulam. Together, they were the parents of nine children:

- Lady Elizabeth Charlotte Louisa Craven (1836–1919), who married Arthur Egerton, 3rd Earl of Wilton in 1858. After his death, she married Arthur Vickris Pryor in 1886.
- Capt. William Augustus Frederick Craven, Viscount Uffington (1838–1865), who died unmarried.
- Lady Evelyn Mary Craven (1839–1924), who married George John Brudenell-Bruce in 1862. She married, secondly, Henry Amelius Beauclerk Coventry in 1869. After their 1877 divorce, she married Capt. George William Hutton Riddell in 1877.
- George Grimston Craven, 3rd Earl of Craven (1841–1883), who married Hon. Evelyn Laura Barrington, a daughter George Barrington, 7th Viscount Barrington.
- Lady Blanche Craven (1842–1930), who married George Coventry, 9th Earl of Coventry in 1865.
- Lady Beatrix Jane Craven (1844–1907), who married George Cadogan, 5th Earl Cadogan in 1865.
- Lady Emily Georgiana Craven (1846–1932), who married Lt.-Col. Victor William Bates Van de Weyer, son of Sylvain Van de Weyer, in 1868.
- Lt. Col. Hon. Osbert William Craven (1848–1923), who died unmarried.
- Hon. Robert Walter Craven (1850–1866), a Naval Officer who died aboard HMS Spiteful and was buried in the British Cemetery in Montevideo.

Lord Craven died on 25 August 1866. His widow, Emily, Countess of Craven, survived her husband by more than 30 years, and died in London 21 May 1901.

=== Descendants ===
Through his second daughter's first marriage, he was a grandfather of George Brudenell-Bruce, 4th Marquess of Ailesbury.

Coat of arms of William Craven, 2nd Earl of Craven
Coronet A Coronet of an Earl Crest On a Chapeau Gules turned up Ermine a Griffin statant wings elevated Ermine beaked and foremembered Or Escutcheon Argent a Fess between six Cross Crosslets fitchée Gules Supporters On either side a Griffin wings elevated Ermine beaked and foremembered Or Motto Virtus in Actione Consistit (Virtue consists in action)

Honorary titles
Preceded by The Earl of Warwick	Lord Lieutenant of Warwickshire; 1853–1856	Succeeded by The Lord Leigh
Peerage of the United Kingdom
Preceded by William Craven	Earl of Craven; 1825–1866	Succeeded by George Craven
