= William Craven, 1st Earl of Craven (1608–1697) =

English courtier and soldier 1608-1697

The Right Honourable The Earl of Craven PC
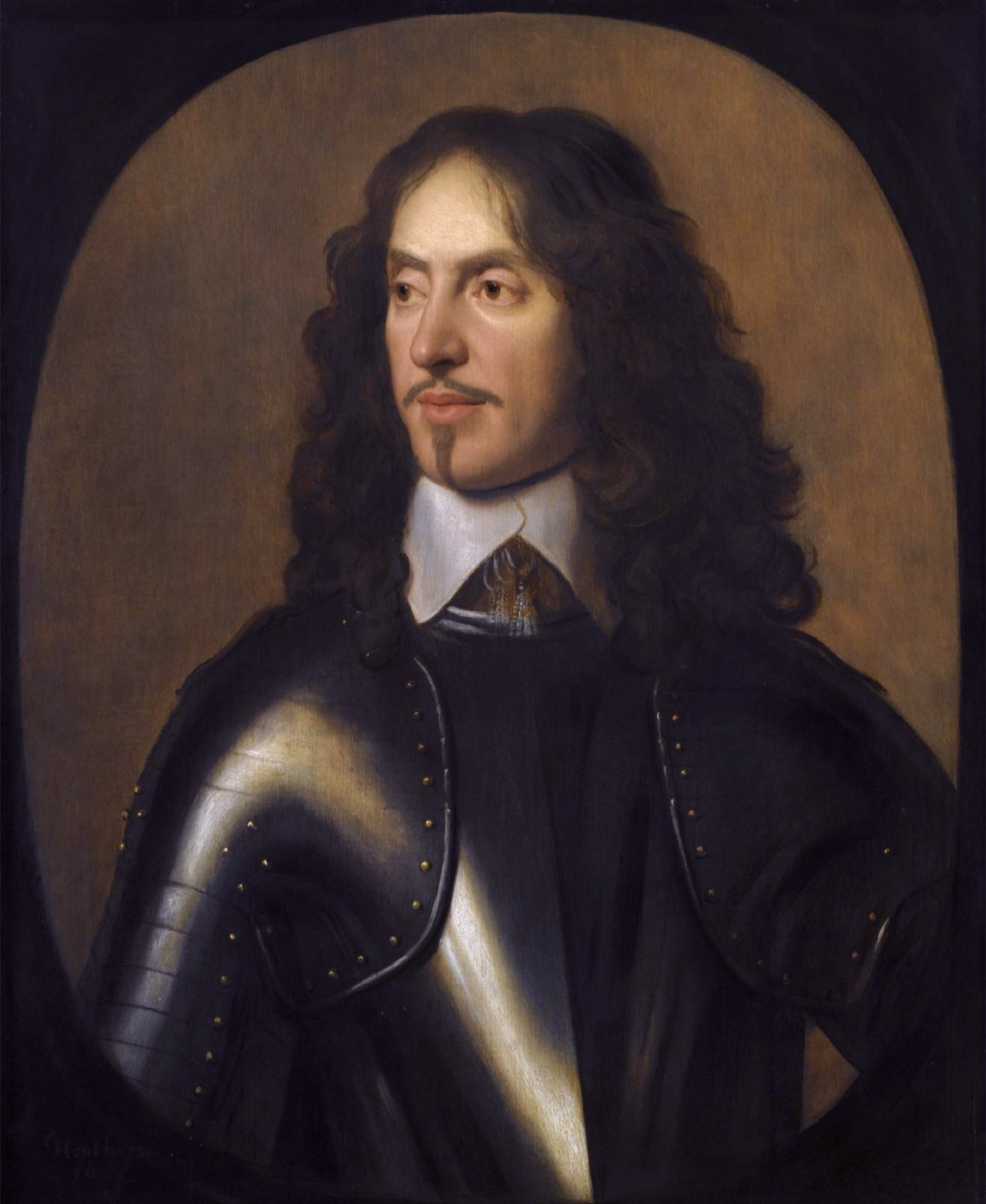
- Portrait by Gerard van Honthorst, c. 1647

Lord Lieutenant of Middlesex
- In office 1670–1697

Personal details
- Born: 26 June 1608 (baptised) London
- Died: 9 April 1697 (aged 88) Drury Lane, London
- Resting place: St Bartholomew's Church, Binley
- Parent(s): William & Elizabeth Craven
- Education: Trinity College, Oxford
- Occupation: Soldier and courtier

Military service
- Battles/wars: Eighty Years' War; Thirty Years' War; Capture of Bad Kreuznach (WIA); Battle of Vlotho (WIA) (POW)

William Craven, 1st Earl of Craven, PC (26 June 1608 – 9 April 1697) was one of the wealthiest peers in England, who spent much of his fortune supporting the exiled Elizabeth of Bohemia.

Although he did not participate in the Wars of the Three Kingdoms, Craven was sympathetic to the Royalist cause, and lent large sums of money to Charles II of England prior to the Stuart Restoration in May 1660. He was rewarded with a variety of government posts, including Lord Lieutenant of Middlesex. He died in London on 9 April 1697, and was buried in Binley, Coventry.

== Personal details ==
William Craven was born in London and baptised on 26 June 1608, eldest son of William Craven (1545-1618), Lord Mayor of London in 1610, and his wife Elizabeth (died 1624), sister of George Whitmore, Lord Mayor in 1631. In addition to William, they had two sons and three daughters, including Mary (1599-1634), Elizabeth (1600-1662), and John (1610-1648).

Craven never married. On his death, his titles and estates were inherited by a distant relative, William Craven, 2nd Baron Craven.

== Career ==
The elder Craven became immensely wealthy lending money to the Crown, and when William inherited his fortune in 1624, he became one of the wealthiest men in England. Like many of his contemporaries, Craven was a firm supporter of the Protestant cause in Europe, especially that of the exiled Frederick V of Bohemia. He entered Trinity College, Oxford in 1623, but left shortly after to serve in the Eighty Years War between the Dutch Republic and Spain.

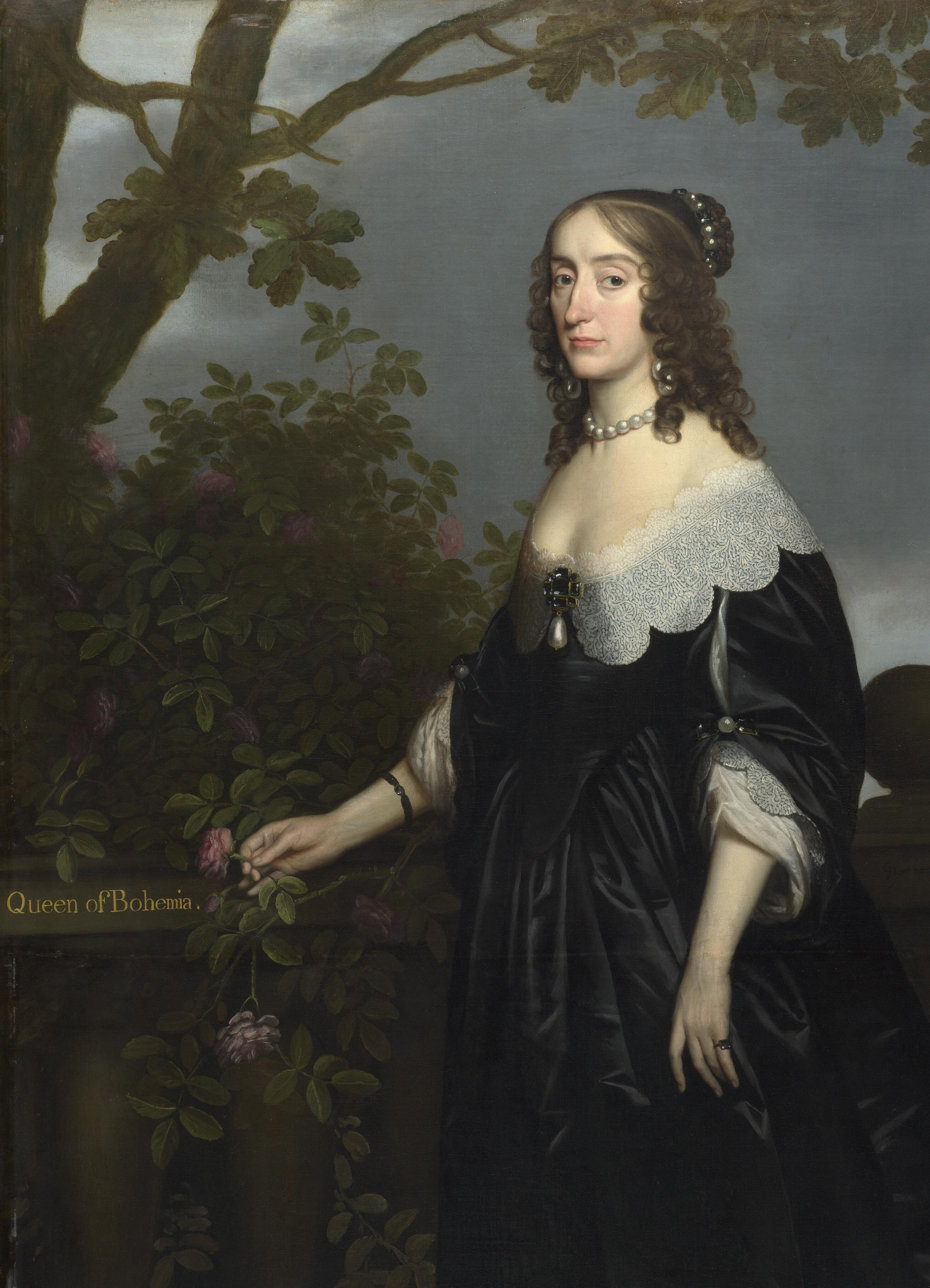
Elizabeth of Bohemia; Craven spent much of his fortune in her support

In March 1632, Craven was seriously wounded in the capture of Bad Kreuznach, where his courage was recognised by Gustavus Adolphus of Sweden. At the Battle of Vlotho in October 1638, he was wounded and taken prisoner along with Prince Rupert of the Rhine. Later ransomed for £20,000, Craven remained in Europe during the Wars of the Three Kingdoms, but supported Charles I financially. This meant following their victory in 1646, Parliament confiscated his property at Caversham Park in Oxfordshire. After the May 1660 Stuart Restoration, Elizabeth of Bohemia remained in the Netherlands, while Craven accompanied Charles II to London, charged with looking after her interests. He planned building a vast palace for her at Hamstead Marshall in Berkshire with a hunting lodge nearby at Ashdown House, Oxfordshire, but she died before construction began, leaving Craven her paintings and papers.

== Courtier ==
After the Restoration, he was rewarded with several court offices and given an earldom. He was granted a share in the Colony of Carolina and served as one of its Lords Proprietors. Craven County, North Carolina, is named for him.

As a Privy Councillor, he seems to have been diligent enough: Samuel Pepys in his Diary regularly mentions his attendance at the committee for Tangier and his chairing of the Committee on Fisheries. In the latter role Pepys was rather shocked by his bawdy language which Pepys thought improper in a councillor (though perhaps natural in an old soldier). In 1678, we read of his presence at the historic Council meeting where Titus Oates first publicised the Popish Plot. In December 1680, Craven was sent to investigate and seize 'Papist Arms'. Pepys's attitude to Craven varies in the Diary – on the one hand, he calls him a coxcomb and criticises his chairing of the Fisheries Committee; at other times he is glad that Craven is his "very good friend".

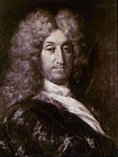
Craven in old age

Whatever Pepys's opinion of him, Craven earned the lasting respect and gratitude of the people of London during the Great Plague of 1665 when, unlike the great majority of noblemen, who fled to the country, he remained in London, helping to maintain order and donating property for burial grounds. He set up The Earl Craven's Pest House Charity, with a dedicated isolation hospital in Soho. By 1687, it was operating as a poorhouse. After Craven's death, and with the plague years past, the house was sold and the funds used to support other charitable projects.

During the Glorious Revolution, on the evening of 17 December 1688, Craven, as colonel of the Coldstream Guards, was on guard duty with his soldiers, protecting King James II at Whitehall Palace, when Hendrik Trajectinus, Count of Solms, commanding three battalions loyal to the Prince of Orange, came to take military possession of the surroundings of the palace. Craven swore that he would be cut to pieces rather than submit, but James, when he heard what was happening, ordered Craven to withdraw.

Craven died on 9 April 1697 aged 88 in London.

== Sources ==
- Ford, David Nash (2001). Royal Berkshire History: William Craven, Earl of Craven (1608–1697)
- Macaulay, Thomas Babington (1878). The History of England from the Accession of James II, Volume II. J. B. Lippincott & Co.
- Marshall, Rosalind K (1998). The Winter Queen:the life of Elizabeth of Bohemia, 1596-1662. National Galleries of Scotland.
- Oman, Carola (1938). The Winter Queen: Elizabeth Of Bohemia: Confessions Of An Actor (2000 ed.). Orion. ISBN 978-1842120576.
- Smuts, R.Malcolm (2021) [2004]. "Craven, William, earl of Craven(bap. 1608, d. 1697)". Oxford Dictionary of National Biography (online ed.). Oxford University Press. doi:10.1093/ref:odnb/6636. (Subscription, Wikipedia Library access or UK public library membership required.)

Military offices
Preceded by Duke of Albemarle	Colonel of the Coldstream Regiment of Foot Guards; 1670–1689	Succeeded by Thomas Tollemache
Honorary titles
Preceded by Lord Lovelace	Custos Rotulorum of Berkshire; 1634–1689	Succeeded by Duke of Norfolk
Preceded by Sir Edward Nicholas	Custos Rotulorum of Middlesex; 1669–1689	Succeeded by Earl of Clare
Preceded by Duke of Albemarle	Lord Lieutenant of Middlesex; 1670–1689	Succeeded by Earl of Clare
Peerage of England
New title	Baron Craven; 1626–1697	Succeeded by William Craven
