= Coombe Abbey =

English country house in Warwickshire

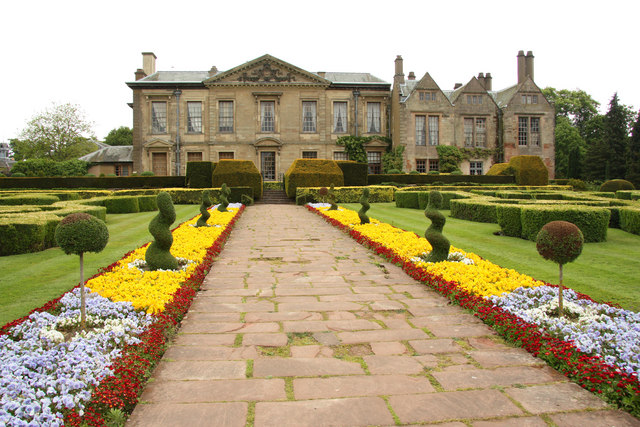
- Interactive map of Coombe Abbey
- Location: Combe Fields, Warwickshire, England
- Coordinates: 52.41457°N 1.40820°W

Listed Building – Grade I
- Official name: Combe Abbey and bridge over moat attached to south
- Designated: 6 October 1960
- Reference no.: 1233485

Listed Building – Grade II*
- Official name: Tennis court at Combe Abbey
- Designated: 24 July 1992
- Reference no.: 1233658

Listed Building – Grade II
- Official name: Combe Abbey, Stableblock approximately 40 metres north east of Abbey
- Designated: 27 August 1986
- Reference no.: 1276600

National Register of Historic Parks and Gardens
- Official name: Combe Abbey
- Type: Grade II*
- Designated: 1 February 1986
- Reference no.: 1000408

Coombe Abbey (also Combe Abbey) is a former Cistercian abbey at Combe Fields in the Borough of Rugby, in the countryside of Warwickshire, England. The abbey was converted to a country house in the 16th century and now operates as a hotel. It is a grade I listed building.

The house's original grounds are now a country park known as Coombe Country Park and run by Coventry City Council.

== Early history as an abbey ==
During the 12th century, the building was known as the Abbey of Cumbe, and was the largest and most influential monastery in Warwickshire. The land was given to the Cistercian monks by Richard de Camville, of Didleton Castle. They accepted the gift, and sent out an advance party of monks, who, living in temporary wooden buildings, began the building of a monastery dedicated to the Blessed Virgin. Among these monks was one called Martin who was to be the first Abbot of the new House which opened in 1150. It was the fifth daughter house of Waverley Abbey.

Numerous gifts of land were made to the monks during the four hundred years of their occupation and they owned land in many counties. In 1470 King Edward IV visited the Abbey. He was on his way from Leicester to Coventry, pursuing his enemy the Earl of Warwick in the Wars of the Roses and he rested awhile at Coombe.

The monastery was well known for its generosity in distributing gifts to the poor. Every Maundy Thursday, money, ten quarters of rye bread, three quarters of malt beer and 300 herrings were given to the poor at the abbey gate.

In 1539, the abbey was suppressed as part of the dissolution of monasteries under Henry VIII. Since then numerous alterations and additions have been made over the centuries. However, parts of the abbey have been preserved and can still be seen in the present building. The cloister lay to the north of the (now demolished) church and its garth forms the present courtyard. Parts of the 15th century cloister arcades survive on the north and west sides. The lower part of the east range of buildings also remains, including the fine doorway and flanking windows of the chapter house, dated to the 1180s.

== Conversion to a private residence ==
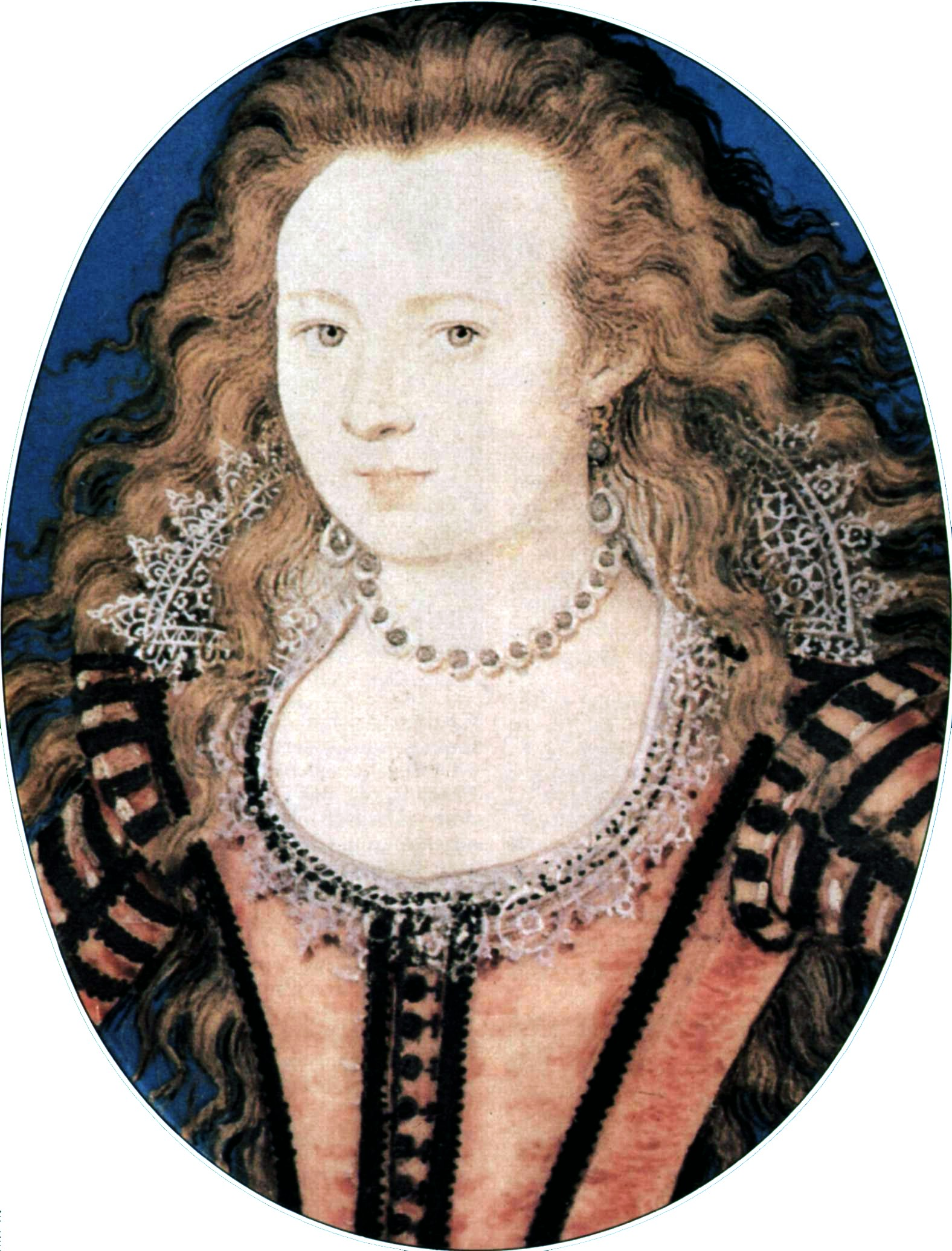
Princess Elizabeth

After the Abbey had been dissolved it passed through numerous owners for the next forty years, during which time the church was pulled down to prevent its reuse as an abbey. In 1581 it came into the possession of Sir John Harington of Exton and he converted the abbey into one of the most substantial houses in the county.

Harington was of Scottish descent, being a descendant of Robert Bruce. When James VI of Scotland became King of England, Harington used his ancestry to win favour. In 1603 James sent his daughter Princess Elizabeth to live at Coombe Abbey. The King issued a Privy Seal Order which declared "we have thought fit to commit the keeping and education of the Lady Elizabeth our daughter to Lord Harington and the Lady his wife". Elizabeth lived at the Abbey for the next five years. Her tutor and chaplain were Master John Tovey, the headmaster of the Free School at Coventry. Elizabeth's favourite childhood companion was Ann Dudley, a niece of Lord Harington, and with her, she formed a lasting friendship.

In May 1604, the plague came to Coventry and Rugby, but Harington wrote to King James that Elizabeth was safe. Later in the year, the famous Gunpowder Plot was conceived. It was planned that King James and his two sons were to be killed, leaving Princess Elizabeth as Queen. Elizabeth was to be kidnapped and a Catholic Regent appointed to rule the country in her minority, during which time she was to be married to a Catholic and educated in Catholicism. To ensure that she was unguarded at Coombe Abbey a hunting match to which Harington was invited, was arranged by the Catholic gentry to take place on 6 November 1605 at Dunchurch, only a few miles from Coombe.

As the plotters marched to Coombe, Lord Harington received word of the rising that morning and had sent Elizabeth to Sir Thomas Holcroft into the walled city of Coventry. The Mayor and nine other citizens mounted guard, drawing bows, pikes and other weapons from the city armoury for this purpose. When the plotters arrived at Coombe they found Elizabeth gone and fled. Most of them were killed while trying to escape, but a few were captured and taken to London where they were executed. On 14 February, Elizabeth married Frederick who later became King of Bohemia and she became the Queen.

John Harrington died in 1613 and after several changes of ownership, the Abbey was bought in 1622 by Lady Elizabeth Craven, widow of Sir William Craven, mayor of London who settled the property on her son. It remained in the Craven family for the next three hundred years.

== The Craven family ==
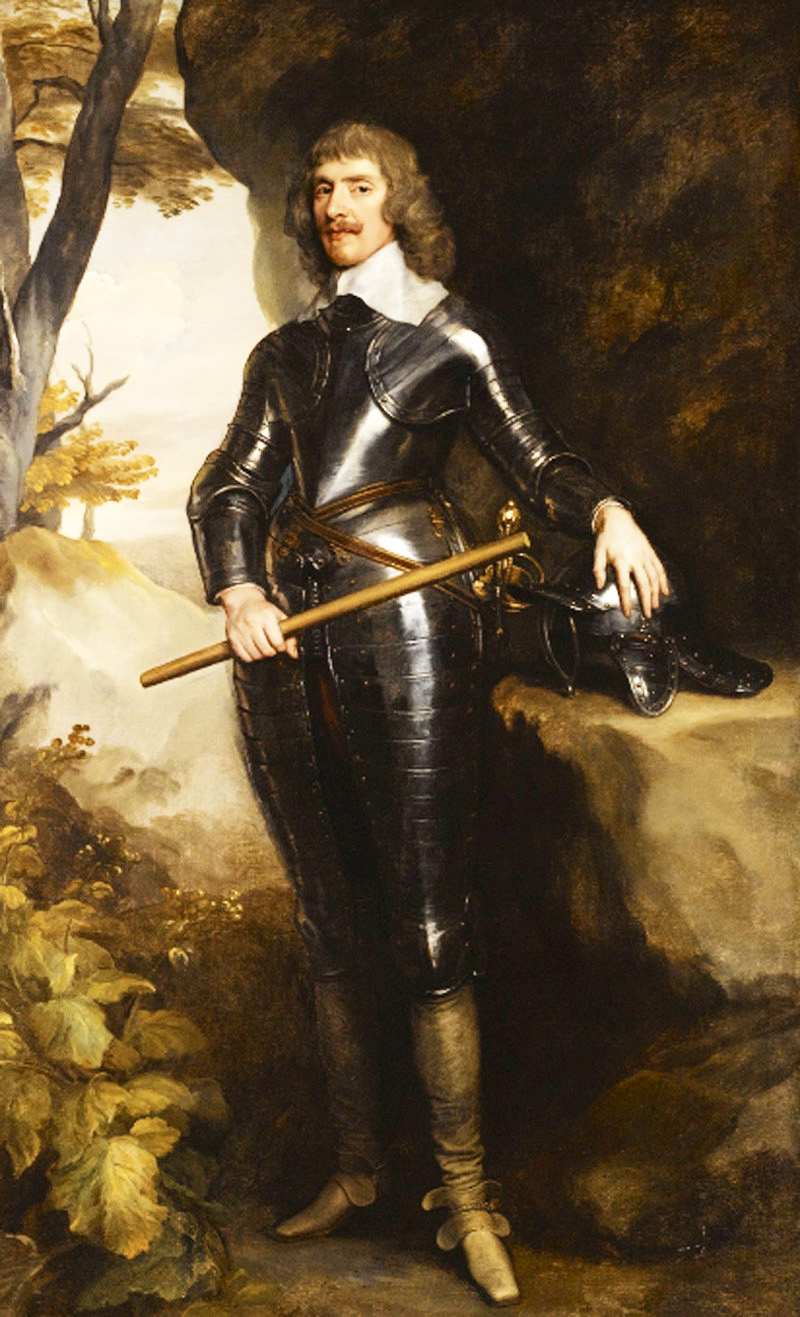
Lieutenant General William Craven,1st Earl Craven

During the Craven ownership, the abbey was extensively developed, with various buildings added, such as the west wing in 1677. The first owner was the son of Lady Elizabeth Craven Lieutenant General William Craven, 1st Earl of Craven.

Lieutenant General William Craven (1608-1687) was a Royalist and at the age of 24 he enlisted to serve in the cause of restoring the King and Queen of Bohemia Frederick and Elizabeth (formerly Princess Elizabeth) to their throne in Germany. He spent most of his life in this cause and gained favour with her brother King Charles I and the subsequent Kings of England.

In 1662, Elizabeth died and left William Craven her collection of Stuart Family paintings which included pictures by such masters as Rubens, Van Dyck and Honthorst. These pictures remained at Coombe Abbey until the beginning of the 20th century.

In 1680-91 the house was rebuilt, incorporating much of the previous structure. This work was done to designs by William Winde, whose correspondence with Sir William Craven (later 2nd Baron) survives. The Earl of Craven died unmarried in 1697 and was succeeded by his cousin's son as second Baron Craven. The Abbey was passed through successive generations until 1769 when it became the home of William Craven, 6th Baron Craven. In 1771 he commissioned the famous landscaper Capability Brown to modernise the landscaping around the property.

Brown was an expert at making serpentine lakes that looked like natural rivers. He dammed Smite Brook to create the main lake, Coombe Pool, and the smaller Top Pool. This sheet of water is 1.5 miles long, covers 90 acres and forms an L shape or ‘dog-leg’ that makes it appear endless. He designed also seven other buildings on the estate with his son in law Henry Holland one of which was the boathouse which survives today. The menagerie in Coombe Park was also designed by Capability Brown. The hexagonal tower with a domed roof was inspired by King Louis XIV's Royal Menagerie at the Palace of Versailles.

In 1825 William Craven, 2nd Earl of Craven succeeded to become the owner of Coombe Abbey. In 1860 he engaged William Eden Nesfield to carry out major alterations to the house at Combe. New servants' quarters were built, the east wing and part of the north wing were demolished and rebuilt in a completely different style, and ornamental gardens were laid out including a moat. The excavation of the moat involved the destruction of the foundations of the abbey church, largely without archaeological record.

The last Earl of Craven to live in Coombe Abbey was William Craven, 4th Earl of Craven. When he died in 1921 his wife Cornelia Countess of Craven decided to sell the property. It was bought in 1923 by a builder named John Grey.

In November 1964 Coventry City Council bought Coombe Abbey with 150 acres (0.61 km^{2}) of land. The park was opened to the public in 1966.

Coombe Abbey Country Park

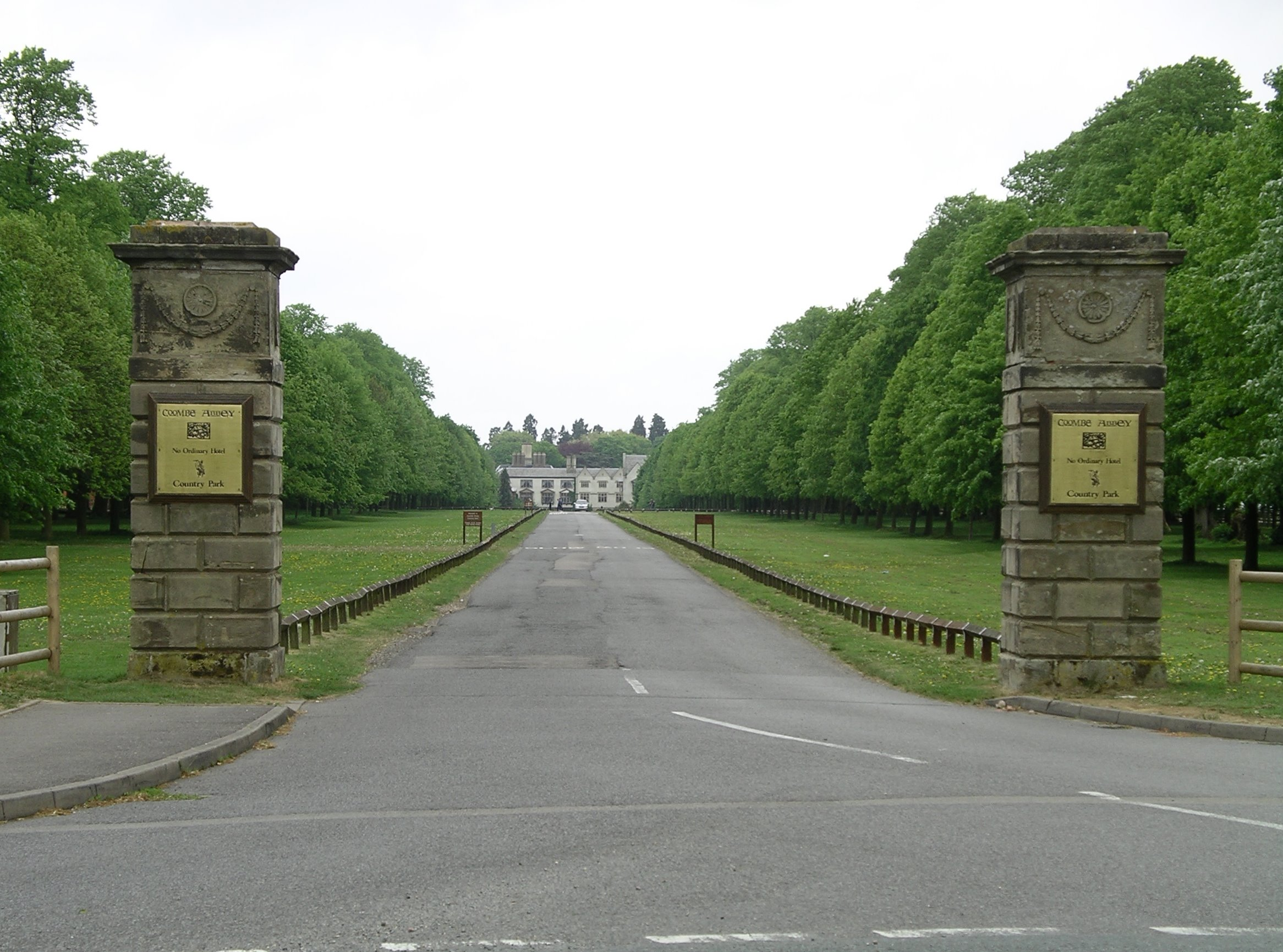
The main entrance to Coombe Abbey and the park

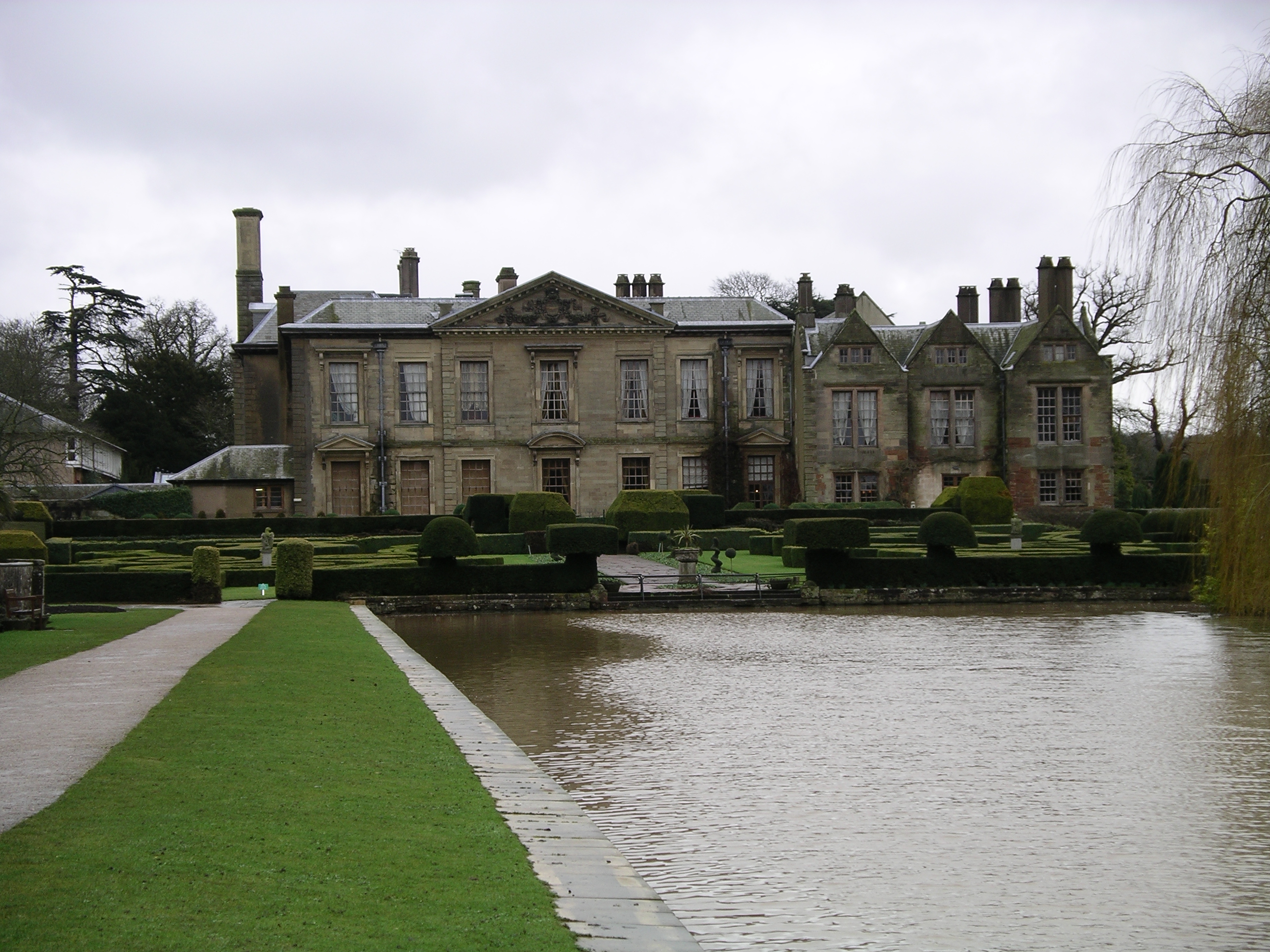
The West Wing, lake and gardens.

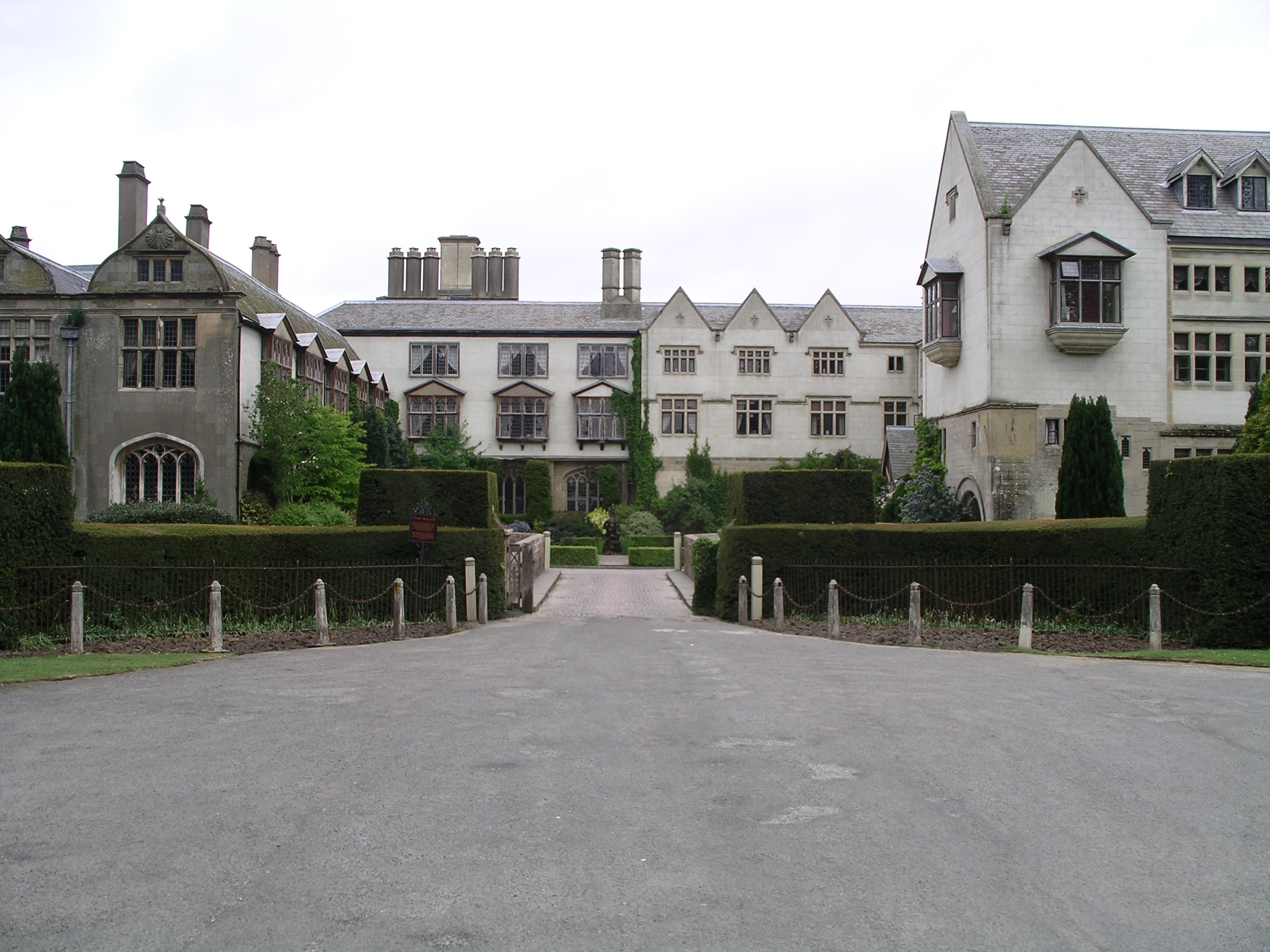
Coombe Abbey, view of the buildings from the main drive.

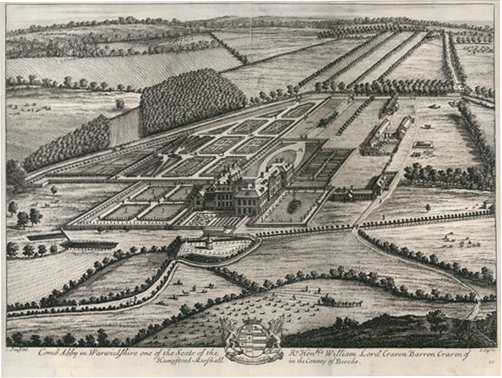
Coombe Abbey in the early 18th century from Kip and Knyff's Britannia Illustrata.

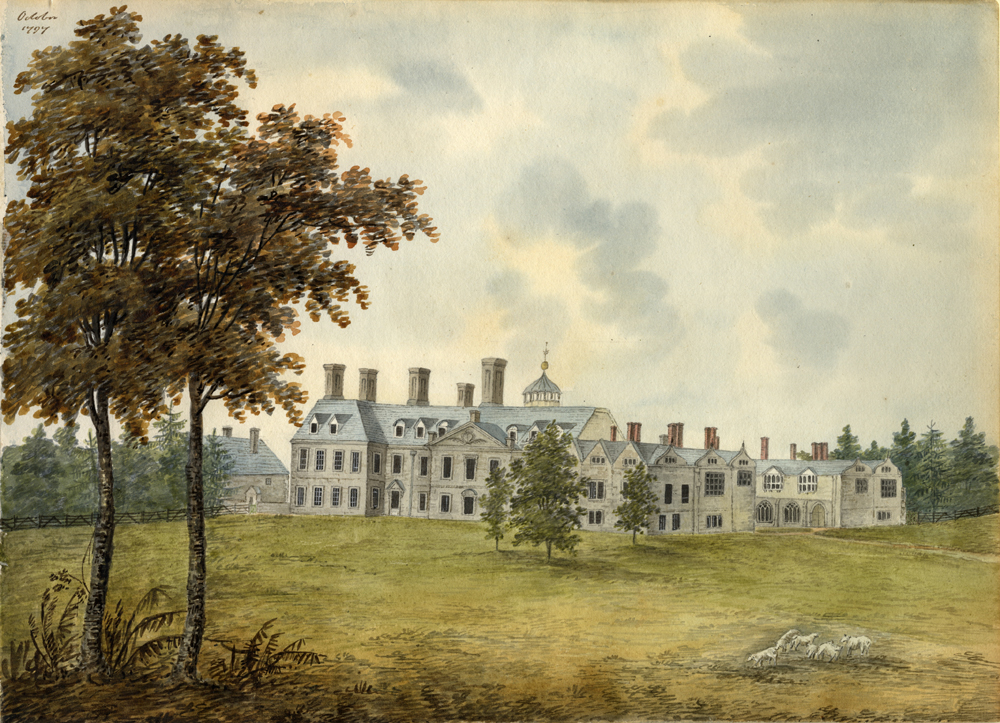
Coombe Abbey in 1797, painted by Maria Johnson.

== TV and film ==
Coombe Abbey was used as the outside of the Mayor's house in the 2009 film Nativity!, starring Martin Freeman. It was also used for filming the pilot of The Wrong Funeral the feature comedy 4th Floor Of Singapore in 2013 and The Shimian in 2021.
