= Brandenburgh House =

Historic property in London

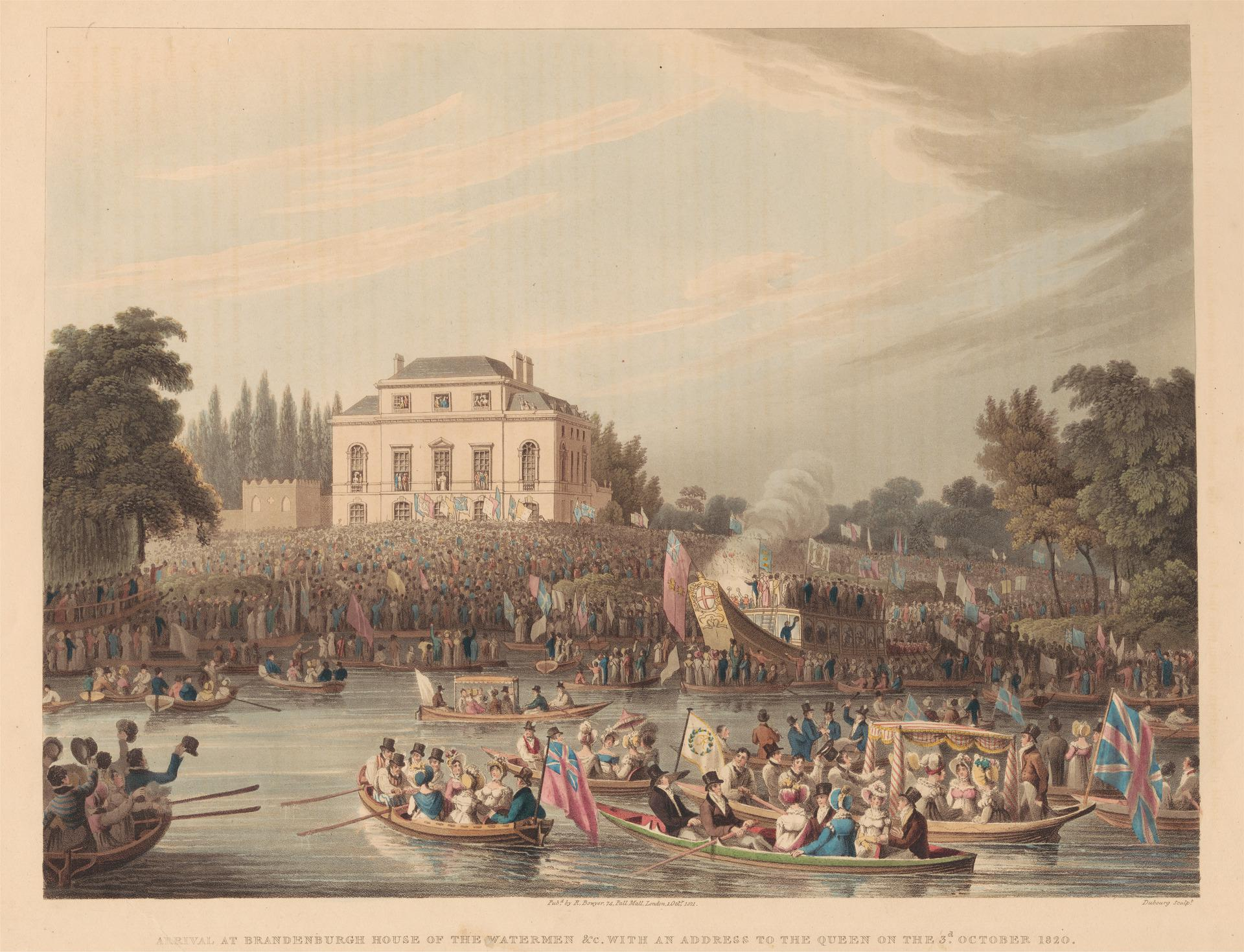
1821 image of the house.

Brandenburgh House was a historic country house on the River Thames in Hammersmith, then in Middlesex some way beyond the outskirts of London. While it had a number of owners it is best known for the brief residence of Caroline of Brunswick in the early 1820s. It is sometimes spelt as Brandenburg House.

== Early history ==
Dating back to the reign of Charles I when it was built for Nicholas Crispe, the house gained its best-known name as the residence of Alexander, Margrave of Brandenburg-Ansbach and his English wife Elizabeth Craven there from 1792. During her time there it became known for staging amateur theatrics. Other earlier residents included Prince Rupert and George Doddington.

== Queen Caroline ==
It gained its greatest attention in 1820 to 1821 when Caroline of Brunswick, the estranged wife of George IV, lived there following her return to Britain after six years abroad. When her husband then tried to divorce her in Parliament it became a centre of pilgrimage for the Queen's supporters. A large delegation of London waterman came on 8 October 1820 to pay their respects.

Although the government presented evidence of her adultery with her Italian lover Bartolomeo Pergarmi, the attempt to divorce her collapsed in the House of Lords. Caroline died in the house on 7 August 1821 just a week after the coronation of her husband to which she had been refused admission. Her body was conveyed back to her native Brunswick from Brandenburgh House. Although her husband insisted on a journey entirely by ship, practical difficulties meant it had to be taken by land at first. The procession was hijacked by the radical populace and taken through the City of London, the heart of her popular support.

== Legacy ==
The house was subsequently demolished. Its historical legacy lives on in the name of the Caroline Estate, a housing estate a little to the north of the old house near Hammersmith Bridge. Today the site of the former Brandenburg House is located in Fulham Reach. A road running from Hammersmith station to the Riverside Studios is called Queen Caroline Street.

== Bibliography ==
- Fraser, Flora. The Unruly Queen: The Life of Queen Caroline. Knopf, 1996.
- Gash, Norman. Lord Liverpool: The Life and Political Career of Robert Banks Jenkinson, Second Earl of Liverpool, 1770-1828 Harvard University Press, 1984.
- Gasper, Julia. Elizabeth Craven: Writer, Feminist and European. Vernon Press, 2018.
- Mitton, Geraldine Edith . Hammersmith, Fulham And Putney. 1903.
- O'Loughlin, Katrina . Women, Writing, and Travel in the Eighteenth Century. Cambridge University Press, 2018.
- Robins, Jane. The Trial of Queen Caroline. Simon and Schuster, 2006 .
