= The People's Princess (radio play) =

2008 radio play by Shelagh Stephenson

The People's Princess was a radio play written by Shelagh Stephenson. Directed in Belfast by Eoin O'Callaghan, it premiered as the Afternoon Play on 11 December 2008 at 2.15pm on BBC Radio 4. It was based around the marriage and divorce of George IV and Caroline of Brunswick. As the title suggests, it drew parallels with the marriage and divorce of Prince Charles and Diana, such as Caroline and Diana's popularity among the British working classes, Charles and George's unpopularity during their divorce proceedings, the fickleness of such popularity or unpopularity, Caroline and Diana's use by anti-monarchical figures for their own ends, and the power of the press.

== Cast ==
- George IV - Alex Jennings
- Caroline of Brunswick - Rebecca Saire
- Henry Brougham - Julian Rhind Tutt
- Lord Sidmouth - Chris McHallem
- Lord Liverpool - Richard Howard
- Sir Robert Gifford - Mark Lambert
- Lady Jersey - Jill Cardo
- Mr Majoucci - Nial Cusack

Offstage characters include the Duke of Wellington, Caroline's dead daughter Princess Charlotte Augusta of Wales, William Wood, William Cobbett and Caroline's lover Mr Pergami.
