= Cimitero degli Inglesi =

Cimitero degli Inglesi is the Italian name of:

- the English Cemetery, Florence and
- the English Cemetery, Naples and
- the Old English Cemetery, Livorno
- The Protestant Cemetery, Rome is occasionally also known by this name
