= List of Emmerdale Farm characters introduced in 1978–1979 =

Emmerdale Farm is a British soap opera that was first broadcast on 16 October 1972. The following is a list of all the characters introduced in 1978 and 1979, by order of first appearance.

== Antony Moeketsi ==
Antony Moeketsi, played by Oscar James, made his first appearance on 17 May 1978. James was the first black actor to join the cast. His character was introduced as a teacher, who ends up teaching Seth Armstrong (Stan Richards) how to read.

Antony starts teaching at the local school, where Seth Armstrong works as a caretaker. He asks Antony to help him learn to read and write and Antony agrees. While he is in Beckindale, Antony helps Reverend Hinton (Hugh Manning) to identify a body buried behind The Woolpack. Antony receives a job in Wales and leaves the village after a few weeks.

== Meg Armstrong ==
Meg Armstrong
- Emmerdale character
- Portrayed by: Ursula Camm; Ruth Holden
- Duration: 1979–1980, 1983, 1986
- First appearance: 15 May 1979
- Last appearance: 10 July 1986
- Introduced by: David Cunliffe (1979); Anne W. Gibbons (1980); Michael Glynn (1983, 1986)
In-universe information
- Husband: Seth Armstrong (until 1993)
- Sons: Jimmy Armstrong; Fred Armstrong

Meg Armstrong is the wife of Seth Armstrong and mother of his sons, Jimmy and Fred. She appeared periodically from 1979 to 1986.

Meg is first seen when her eldest son Jimmy and his fiancé come to stay with them after years living away from home. Meg is happy to see her son despite differences between Jimmy and his parents. Meg is initially portrayed as a downtrodden housewife but in her later appearances she is a highly religious woman, who Seth finds hard to live with. His nickname for her is "poppet". She gets a job as cleaner at The Woolpack pub and accidentally breaks Henry Wilks' favourite pipe. Henry and Amos Brearly decide to fire her but she resigns from her job before they can do so. This is Meg's last onscreen appearance. But she is mentioned several times by Seth over the following years.

Meg dies in February 1993, of a possible stroke, and Seth finds it hard to cope. The villagers help him out with the housework to try to make it easier for him.

== Bob Jerome ==
Bob Jerome is a vicar. He was portrayed by Richard Howard in 20 episodes from 1979 to 1981.
