= Rebecca Saire =

British actress and writer (born 1963)

- Born: 16 April 1963 (age 63); London, England
- Occupations: Actress, writer
- Years active: 1968–present
- Spouse: Roger Allam
- Children: 2

Rebecca Saire (born 16 April 1963) is a British actress and writer who gained early attention when, at the age of fourteen, she played Juliet for the BBC Television Shakespeare series.

== Stage ==
- Sybil in Private Lives (National Theatre)
- Eliante in The Misanthrope (Piccadilly Theatre)
- Mabel in An Ideal Husband (Gielgud Theatre)
- Gwendolen in Travesties (RSC and Savoy Theatre)
- Diana in All's Well That Ends Well (RSC)
- Audrey Walsingham in The School of Night (RSC)
- Rachel in A Jovial Crew (RSC)
- She was "a beautiful and truly tragic Ophelia" (Time Out) to Mark Rylance's Hamlet at the RSC in 1989
- Princess Mary in Crown Matrimonial (Yvonne Arnaud Theatre/Tour)

== Filmography ==
=== Television ===
- Romeo and Juliet (1978)
- Quatermass (1979, TV)
- Love in a Cold Climate (TV serial, 1980), as Victoria
- A.D. (1985), TV film
- Vanity Fair (1987, TV)
- Jeeves and Wooster (1991, TV), as Aline Hemmingway
- Dr. Jenkins in My Dad's the PM
- Theresa Nolan in A Taste for Death
- Shona, the high-flying executive wife of DC Duncan Lennox in the long running ITV Drama The Bill
- She also made guest appearances in A Bit of Fry and Laurie
- Miriam Heartley-Reade in season 7, episode 3 – The Fisher King of Midsomer Murders (2004)
- Lady Alexandra Metcalfe in episode 6, season 2 ("Vergangenheit") of The Crown (2017)
- Mrs. Radowicz in season 5, episode 4, season 7, episode 2, of Endeavour (2019)
- Killing Eve (2020, BBC TV), as Bertha Kruger, season 3, episode 4
- Jonquil Heathcote in Doctors (2022)

=== Films ===
- The Shooting Party (1985)

=== Radio ===
- Caroline of Brunswick, Princess of Wales, in "The People's Princess",
- Philippa in "The Experiences of an Irish RM", based on The Irish R.M. novels,
- Sue in "The Small Back Room", based on the novel of that title,
- Joan Greenwood in "Kind Hearts", about the classic comedy film Kind Hearts and Coronets

=== Writing ===
Saire has written three plays for BBC Radio 4, all produced by Eoin O'Callaghan:

- Standing on Tiptoe
- The Detox
- Clapham Junction (Radio Times – Pick of the Week)
