= William Craven, 6th Baron Craven =

British landowner and militia officer

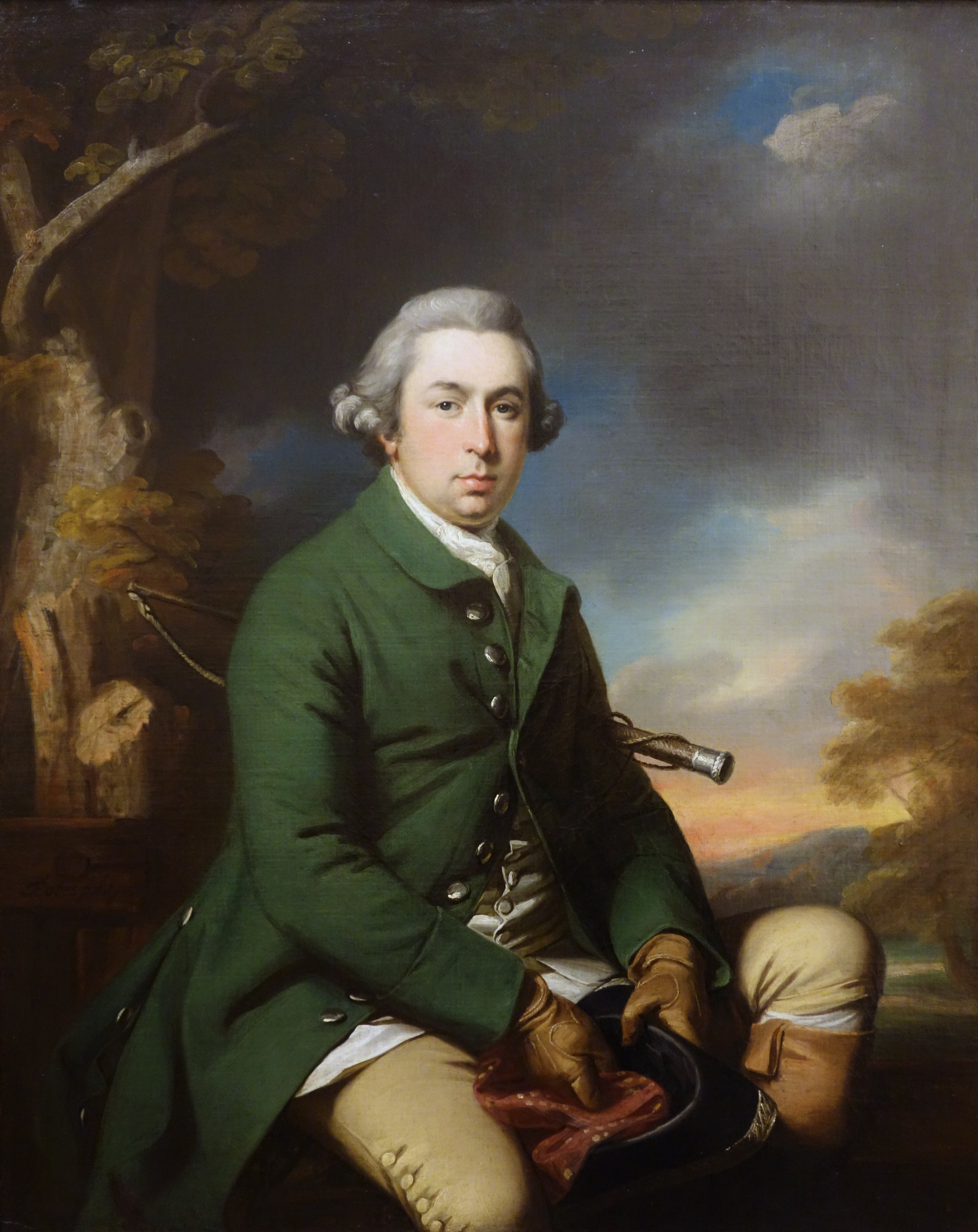
Portrait by Francis Cotes, 1768

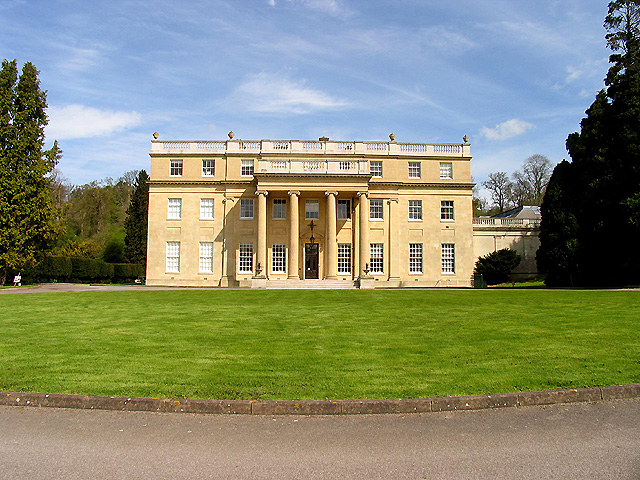
Benham Park

Colonel William Craven, 6th Baron Craven (11 September 1738 – 26 September 1791) was a British landowner and militia officer.

== Life ==
William Craven was the son of Revd John Craven, Vicar of Stanton Lacy, Shropshire (1708–1752), and his wife, Mary Rebecca Hickes (1714–1791), daughter of Rev. Baptist Hickes. He succeeded his uncle, William Craven, as Baron Craven in 1769.

In 1775, he built Benham Park at the site of Benham Valence in Speen, Berkshire where he lived with his wife, Lady Elizabeth Berkeley, until she left him in 1780 to travel in Europe. They had issue: three sons and four daughters. After his death on 27 September 1791 at age 53 in Lausanne, Switzerland, she married Alexander, Margrave of Brandenburg-Ansbach.

It was Lord Craven who, in 1780, built the original Cottage at what is now an English Premier League stadium Craven Cottage, Fulham.

As Lord Lieutenant of Berkshire from 1786 he also served as colonel of the Berkshire Militia.

== Issue ==
His children were:

- Hon. Maria Margaret Craven (1769–1851), married William Molyneux, 2nd Earl of Sefton
- Major-General William Craven, 1st Earl of Craven (1770–1825)
- Major-General Hon. Henry Augustus Berkeley Craven (b. 1776)
- Hon. Richard Keppel Craven (1779–1851)
- Hon. Elizabeth Craven, married John Edward Maddocks
- Hon. Georgiana Craven
- Hon. Arabella Craven, married General Hon. Frederick St John

Honorary titles
| Preceded by The Duke of St Albans | Lord Lieutenant of Berkshire; 1786–1791 | Succeeded by The Earl of Radnor |
Peerage of England
| Preceded by William Craven | Baron Craven; 1769–1791 | Succeeded by William Craven |
