= Keppel Craven =

British nobleman, traveller and author (1779–1851)

The Honourable Keppel Richard Craven (14 April 1779 – 24 June 1851) was a British nobleman, traveller and author.

== Life ==
Craven was the third and youngest son of William Craven, 6th Baron Craven and his wife née Lady Elizabeth Berkeley, daughter of the 4th Earl of Berkeley. His parents separated when Keppel was only three years old and his mother moved to France with him, but it was under a promise to return him to his father when he was eight years of age. This condition was not fulfilled. They returned to England in 1791 to send Keppel to school at Harrow under an assumed name, where, however, he was soon recognised by his likeness to her, and henceforth was called by his family name.

His father died on 27 September 1791 and his mother in the following month married Christian Frederick Charles Alexander, Margrave of Brandenburg-Ansbach. Craven was not by these events permanently estranged from his mother.

In 1814 he accepted the post of one of the Chamberlains to Caroline, Princess of Wales, without receiving any emolument; but this occupation lasted for a short time only, until the princess departed for Geneva. Six years afterwards he was called on to give evidence at the trial of the unfortunate princess, when he stated that he was in her service for six months, during which time he never saw any impropriety in her conduct either at Milan or Naples, or improper familiarity on the part of her Italian servant Bergami.

Having received a considerable addition to his fortune, Craven in 1833 purchased a large convent in Penta, in the mountains near Salerno, which he fitted up as a residence, and there received his visitors with much hospitality. He was for many years the intimate friend and inseparable companion of Sir William Gell; he shared his own prosperity with his less fortunate comrade, cheered him when in sickness, and attended him with unwearying kindness, until Gell's death in 1836. It was a long-term partnership, and Gell was almost certainly the love of Keppel's life. However, as a young man in Naples, Keppel fathered an illegitimate son, Augustus Craven (1806–1884; mother unknown), who married Pauline de la Ferronays,(later to be known as the authoress 'Mrs Augustus Craven').

Keppel maintained a correspondence with Lady Blessington, who arrived in Naples in July 1823; some of his letters to her are printed in her Life by Richard Robert Madden. He died at Naples 24 June 1851, aged 72, being the last of a triumvirate of British literati, scholars, and gentlemen who resided there for many years in the closest bonds of friendship, namely, Sir William Drummond, Sir William Gell, and the Hon. K. R. Craven. He was buried in the English Cemetery in Naples.

== Works ==
Craven published in 1821 A Tour through the Southern Provinces of the Kingdom of Naples, and in 1836 Excursions in the Abruzzi and Northern Provinces of Naples, in 2 vols. The former of these two works is embellished with views from his own sketches, and the latter with a smaller number from drawings by W. Westall. Another work, published in London in 1825, was Italian Scenes: a Series of interesting Delineations of Remarkable Views and of Celebrated Remains of Antiquity. Chiefly sketched by the Hon. K. Craven.
