= Elizabeth, Princess Berkeley =

British noblewoman (1750–1828)

Elizabeth Princess Berkeley
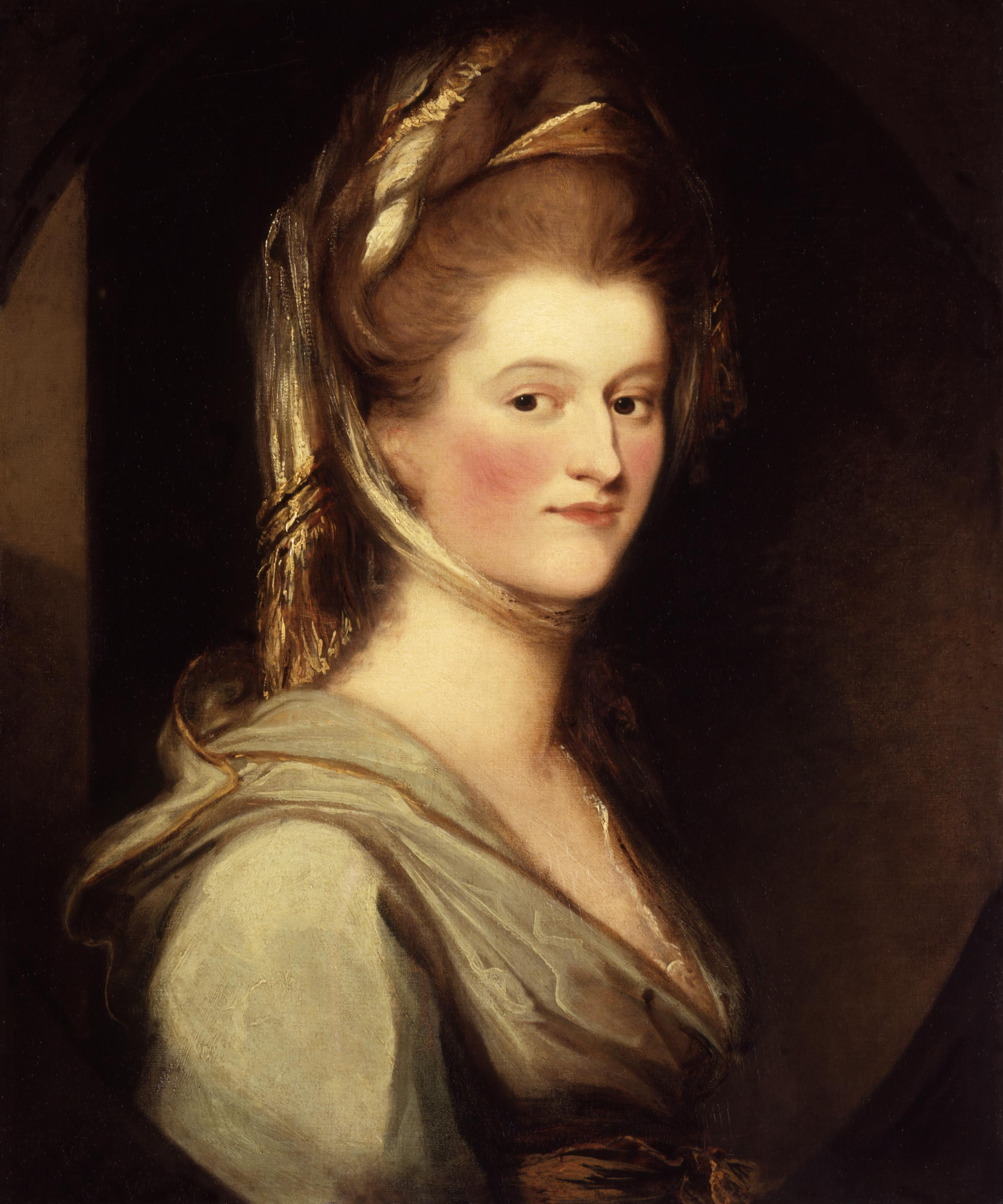
- Portrait by Ozias Humphry, c. 1780
- Born: Elizabeth Berkeley; 17 December 1750; Mayfair, London, England
- Died: 13 January 1828 (aged 77); Posilipo, Naples, Kingdom of the Two Sicilies
- Occupation: Writer
- Spouses: William Craven, 6th Baron Craven (m. 1767; died 1791) Alexander, Margrave of Brandenburg-Ansbach (m. 1791; died 1806)
- Children: 7, including William Craven, 1st Earl of Craven
- Relatives: Augustus Berkeley, 4th Earl of Berkeley (father); Elizabeth Drax (mother)
- Writing career
- Period: 1778–1826
- Subjects: Travel writing; drama; memoirs

Elizabeth, Princess Berkeley (born Lady Elizabeth Berkeley; 17 December 1750 – 13 January 1828), sometimes unofficially styled Margravine of Brandenburg-Ansbach, previously Elizabeth Craven, Baroness Craven of Hamstead Marshall, was an author and playwright, perhaps best known for her travelogues.

== Biography ==
=== Early life ===
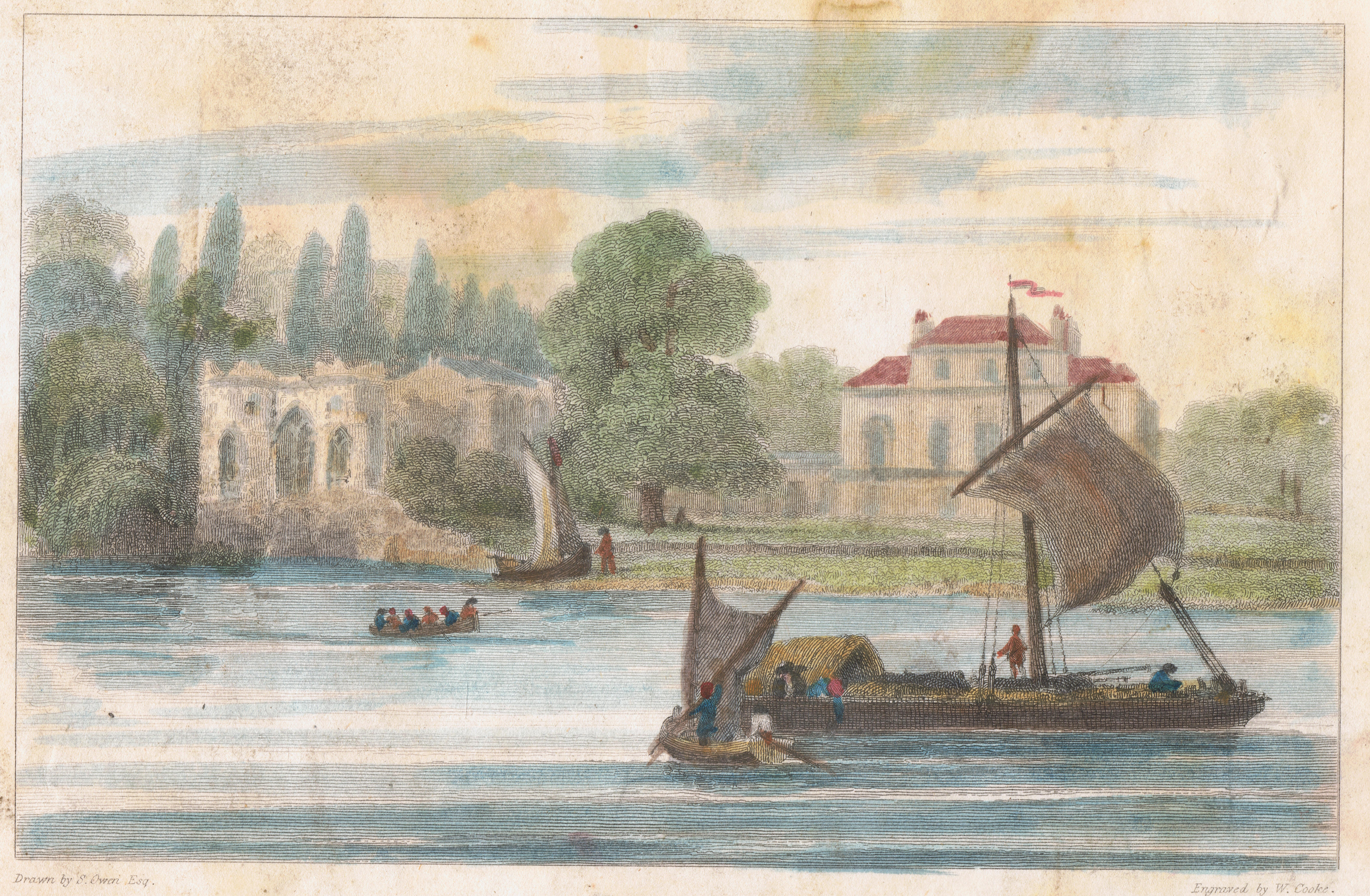
The Margravine of Anspach's Brandenburgh House, published May 1, 1809, drawn by S. Owen, engraved by W. Cooke.

Elizabeth Berkeley was born in Mayfair, London, the fifth child of Augustus Berkeley, 4th Earl of Berkeley and his wife, Elizabeth, daughter of Henry Drax and Elizabeth Ernle. She was the second child in the family to survive infancy.

=== Marriages and later life ===
Her life was full of scandal: on 30 May 1767, "much against her will at the age of sixteen", she was married to William Craven, 6th Baron Craven. After thirteen years of marriage, seven children, and affairs reported on both sides, the couple parted permanently in 1780. She had an affair with Charles Francis Greville sometime in late 1783.

Thereafter she lived in France and traveled extensively on the Continent. She lost contact with her eldest six children, but her seventh child, Keppel Richard Craven, who was four, lived with her.

For a number of years she maintained a romantic relationship with Alexander, Margrave of Brandenburg-Ansbach. During her years at the Ansbach court, Lady Craven formed an amateur theatre at court, which counted the composer Maria Theresia von Ahlefeldt among its members. Princess Frederica Caroline of Saxe-Coburg-Saalfeld, the Margrave's wife since 1754, died on 18 February 1791, and Lord Craven died in Lausanne on 26 September 1791. Lady Craven and the Margrave then married in Lisbon on 30 October 1791 and settled in England.

The Margravine was not received socially by certain women, and nor by King George III, and Queen Marie Antoinette when she visited France, the couple lived a full and opulent life in Hammersmith, London, and at Benham Park, Berkshire.

Lady Craven was never legally entitled to share her husband's German rank and title, though on 20 February 1801, she was granted the morganatic title of "Princess (Fürstin) Berkeley" by the last Holy Roman Emperor, Francis II. In fact, Alexander, being the last of his cadet branch of the House of Hohenzollern, and childless, had exchanged his hereditary birthright to the appanages of Ansbach and Bayreuth for an annuity of 300,000 guilders from his pater familias, King Frederick William II of Prussia, a month after his second marriage. In England, however, the couple were usually known as the Margrave and Margravine of Brandenburg-Ansbach.

After Alexander's death at Benham Park in 1806, Princess Berkeley moved to Naples. She died at Craven Villa in Posillipo and was buried in 1828 in the English Cemetery at Naples. Her links with the Hammersmith area are commemorated in the names of two roads in the area – Margravine Gardens and Margravine Road. There is a wall monument by Roubiliac to her in St Mary's Church, Scarborough.

Her children were:

- Hon. Elizabeth Craven (1768 – 1799), married John Edward Maddocks
- Hon. Maria Margaret Craven (1769 – 1851), married William Molyneux, 2nd Earl of Sefton
- Major-General William Craven, 1st Earl of Craven (1770 – 1825)
- Hon. Georgiana Craven (1772 – 1839)
- Hon. Arabella Craven (1774 – 1819), married General Hon. Frederick St John
- Major-General Hon. Henry Augustus Berkeley Craven (1776 – 1836)
- Hon. Richard Keppel Craven (1779 – 1851)

== Works ==
Early in her literary career she wrote a number of light farces, pantomimes, and fables, some of which were performed in London. She knew Samuel Johnson and James Boswell, and became a close friend of Horace Walpole, who published her early works.

=== Publications ===
- ———— (c. 1775). O Mistress Mine.: this is one of the few of Craven's musical compositions to survive.
- ———— (1778). The Sleep-Walker, a Comedy; in two acts. Translated from the French, in March, M.DCC.LXXVIII. Strawberry Hill GB: Printed by T. Kirgate.: Translated from Le Somnambule, a comedy by Antoine de Ferriol de Pont-de-Veyle; Craven also wrote the prologue and epilogue.
- ———— (1780). A Fashionable Day. UK: G. Kearsly and R. Faulder.: translated from Giuseppe Parini's original Italian
- ———— (1779). Modern anecdote of the ancient family of the Kinkvervankotsdarsprakengotchderns: a tale for Christmas 1779. Dedicated to the Honorable Horace Walpole, Esq;. London: printed for the author; and sold by M. Davenhill, No 13, Cornhill; J. Bew, Pater-Noster-Row; and the Booksellers in Town and Country.: published anonymously; went into four editions by 1781. An opera based on this book was performed at the Theatre Royal, Haymarket in 1781.
- ———— (1780). The miniature picture. A comedy in three acts. London: printed by W. Richardson.: published anonymously; a new edition came out the following year after the play debuted professionally
- ———— (1781). Songs, duets, trios, &c. in The silver tankard; or, ehe [sic] point at Portsmouth. As performed at the Theatre-Royal in the Hay-Market. London: printed for T. Cadell, in the Strand.: published anonymously
- ———— (1789). A journey through the Crimea to Constantinople. In a series of letters from the right honourable Elizabeth Lady Craven, to His Serene Highness the Margrave of Brandebourg, Anspach, and Bareith. Written in the year MDCCLXXXVI. London: printed for G. G. J. and J. Robinson.: there was a second edition, and an Irish edition, the same year
- ———— (1790). Le Philosophe Moderne. Comédie en trois actes [The Modern Philosopher] (in French). Anspach.: this play was only translated into English in 2018
- ———— (1791). Remarks in a journey through the Crimea by Lady Craven. Selected from her elegant letters. Interspersed with descriptive accounts. By various autors. London: printed by J.S. Barr.
- ———— (1794). Letters from a Peeress of England to her Eldest Son. London: Debrett.
- ———— (1798). Airs and chorusses in The Princess of Georgia, an opera: written by Her Serene Highness the Margravine of Anspach, and performed at Brandenburgh-House Theatre, 1798. London.
- ———— (1802). The Soldier of Dierenstein; or, Love and Mercy. An Austrian Story, by H. S. H. The M. of A—. Newbury, GB: Printed by T. Mayo, and published by J. White, Fleet-Street, London.
- ———— (1814). Letters from the Right Honorable Lady Craven, to his serene highness the margrave of Anspach, during her travels through France, Germany, and Russia in 1785 and 1786.
- ———— (1826). Memoirs of the Margravine of Anspach. Written by herself. In two volumes. London: Henry Colburn, New Burlington Street.

=== Performances ===
Most of Craven's plays were produced as private theatricals at Brandenburgh House at Fulham. Three of them were produced on the professional stage:

- The Miniature Picture ran four nights at Drury Lane beginning Wednesday 24 May 1780.
- The Silver Tankard; or, The Point at Portsmouth (with music by Craven, Tommaso Giordani, and Samuel Arnold) began a six-performance run at the Haymarket Theatre on Wednesday 18 July 1781.
- The Princess of Georgia played at Covent Garden on Friday 19 April 1799.

=== Etexts ===
- The Georgian Princess. 1799 [1798]. Archived from the original on 6 January 2007.
- Modern anecdotes (1779): full text at Google Books
- The Miniature Picture (1780): full text at Google Books
- A journey through the Crimea (1789): full text at HathiTrust; full text at Google Books
- Memoirs of the Margravine of Anspach (1826): full text at HathiTrust; full text at Google Books
