= Villa Caprile, Pesaro =

Seventeenth-century Italian Baroque palace

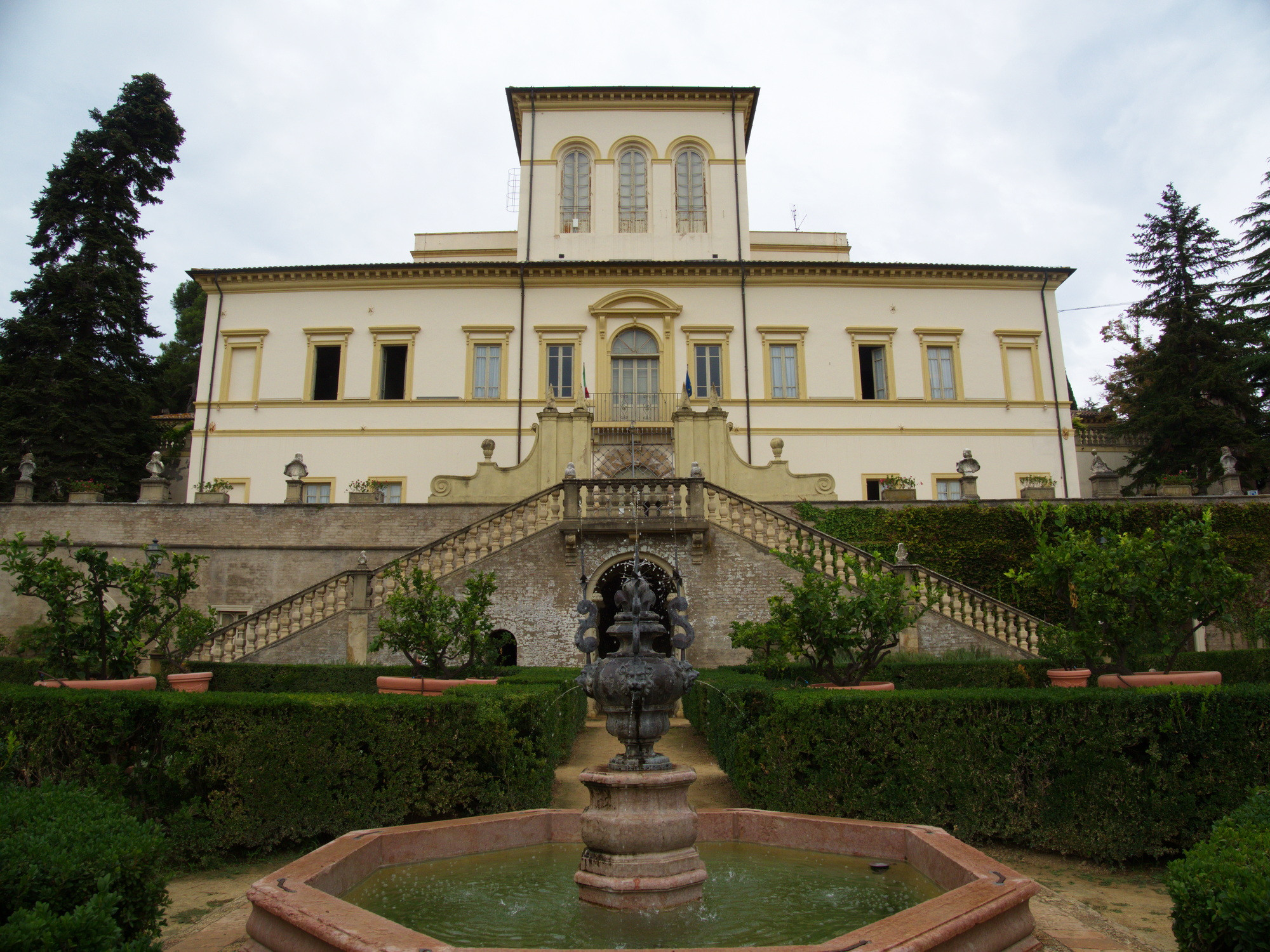

The Villa Caprile, once known as Villa Mosca is a Baroque rural palace located on Strada di Caprile, outside of the Porta Rimini, in the outskirts of Pesaro, region of Marche, Italy.

The villa was built in 1640 as a summer house by the Marquis Giovanni Mosca, which included fountains with giochi d'acqua (water play). His son Francesco had the chapel reconstructed. Carlo Mosca Barzi performed a further reconstruction in a Neoclassical-style. In the 18th century, the arbors were created. The villa was transferred to the commune during the Napoleonic occupations.

In 1817–1818, the villa housed Caroline of Brunswick, princess of Wales, and later briefly, Queen-consort of the United Kingdom. Caroline was in self-imposed exile from her husband, the unpopular George IV of the United Kingdom.

In 1876 it housed the Scuola pratica di Agricoltura, and in 1924 it transformed to the Scuola Agraria Media; and today houses the Istituto Tecnico Agrario. The landscaping suffered during the second world war.

As of 2015, the gardens and fountains are open for visitors; the interiors of the villa are in need of restoration. They were frescoed with mythologic subjects in the 17th century by Giulio Cesare Begni. Further works were added in the 18th century by Ubaldo Geminiani.

The garden facade stands on a balustraded parterre. Two staircases descend to the next parterre with a formal Italian garden, finally, descending further to an elliptical basin has a statue of Atlante holding the Globe.
