= Richard Howard (actor) =

British actor (1944–2024)

- Born: 8 March 1944; Hitchin, Hertfordshire
- Died: 26 January 2024 (aged 79)
- Occupation: Actor

Richard Howard (8 March 1944 – 26 January 2024) was a British actor.

== Life and career ==
Richard Howard was born in Hitchin, Hertfordshire on 8 March 1944. His father was a civil servant and he attended a preparatory school and Haberdashers' Aske's School. He then trained as an actor at the Bristol Old Vic Theatre School before appearing on stage in repertory theatre, at the Oxford Playhouse and the Royal Court Theatre. He was a former teacher at Royal Academy of Dramatic Art, and member of the London Shakespeare Group.

Howard portrayed vicar Bob Jerome in the ITV soap Emmerdale Farm from 1979 to 1981.

Howard also appeared in Agatha Christie's Poirot episodes - Four and Twenty Blackbirds in 1989.

Howard died on 26 January 2024; at the age of 79.

== Select filmography ==
- Oh! What a Lovely War (1969)
- Agatha Christie's Poirot episodes - Four and Twenty Blackbirds (1989)
- The People’s Princess (2008)
