= William Gell =

British archaeologist

Sir William Gell
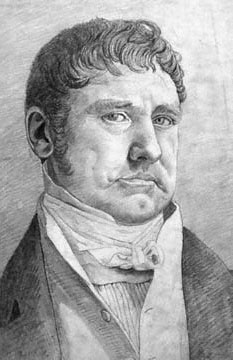
- William Gell, by Cornelius Varley, 1816 (National Portrait Gallery).
- Born: 31 March 1777; Hopton, Derbyshire, England
- Died: 4 February 1836 (aged 58); Naples, Italy
- Occupations: Illustrator, archaeologist
- Notable work: Pompeiana; the Topography, Edifices and Ornaments of Pompeii

Sir William Gell FRS (29 March 1777 – 4 February 1836) (pronounced "Jell") was a British classical archaeologist, Egyptologist, and illustrator. He published topographical illustrations of Troy and the surrounding area in 1804. He also published illustrations of the results of archaeological digs at Pompeii. His best-known work is Pompeiana; the Topography, Edifices and Ornaments of Pompeii, published between 1817 and 1832.

== Early years and education ==
Born at Hopton in Derbyshire, the son of Philip Gell and Dorothy Milnes (daughter and coheir of William Milnes of Aldercar Park). The Gell family was one of the oldest families in England with a tradition of service in the Army, Navy, Parliament and the Church going back to 1209, in the reign of King John. His great grandfather was the parliamentarian Sir John Gell and his uncle was Admiral John Gell. Gell was educated at Derby School and Emmanuel College, Cambridge. He matriculated there in 1793, took a BA degree in 1798 and an MA in 1804, and was elected a fellow of Emmanuel.

== The Topography of Troy, and its Vicinity ==
In 1801, at the age of 24, Gell was sent on his first diplomatic mission to Greece.

From 1804 to 1806 he travelled in Greece, the neighbouring islands, and coastal Asia Minor. In 1804 he fixed the site of Troy at Bournabashi, some distance south—approximately six miles or nine-and-a-half kilometres directly, eight miles or thirteen kilometres by modern roads – of the modern consensus site at Hisarlik. He cited Jean Baptiste LeChevalier "and others" as his sources for the idea, which his own observations seemed to him to confirm, although he pointed out what he considered unresolved problems.

He published The Topography of Troy and its vicinity illustrated and explained by drawings and descriptions etc. in 1804.

Lord Byron mentions him in his work 'English Bards' thus:

Of Dardan tours let dilettanti tell I leave topography to classic Gell.

== Publications ==
William Gell was a great friend of Thomas Moore, Walter Scott and Lord Byron. He wrote many books, most of them illustrated with his own sketches.

He was in 1807 elected a Member of the Society of Dilettanti and a Fellow of the Royal Society. In 1811 the Society of Dilettanti commissioned him to explore Greece and Asia Minor. These travels resulted in several publications, e.g. Geography and Antiquities of Ithaca and Itinerary of Greece, with a Commentary on Pausanias and Strabo.

With these publications he achieved fame in the scholarly circles as a classical topographer. He went with Princess (afterwards Queen) Caroline to Italy in 1814 as one of her chamberlains. He gave evidence in her favour on 6 October 1820, at her trial before the House of Lords, stating that he had left her service merely on account of a fit of the gout and had seen no impropriety between her and her courtier Bergami. However, in letters of 1815 and 1816, written under such pseudonyms as 'Blue Beard', 'Adonis' and 'Gellius', he related bits of scandal about the Queen. He was Knighted on 11 May 1814. Gell was a close friend of Keppel Richard Craven and travelled around Italy with him.

== Later years ==
From 1820 until his death, he resided in Rome, where he painted. He had another house in Naples, where he received visitors including his particular friends Sir William Drummond, the Hon. Keppel Craven, John Auldjo, Lady Blessington and Sir Walter Scott.

Although crippled by gout, Sir William took Scott to Pompeii and showed him around the excavations. After Scott's death, Sir William drew up an account of their conversations in Naples, part of which is printed in Lockhart's 'Life of Scott'. It was then that he published some of his best known archaeological work including Pompeiana and The Topography of Troy.

Gell died at Naples in 1836 and was buried in the English Cemetery, Naples. On his death he left all his personal belongings to Craven.

== Legacy ==
His numerous drawings of classical ruins and localities, executed with great detail and exactness, are preserved in the British Museum. Gell was a thorough dilettante, fond of society and possessed of little real scholarship. Nonetheless his topographical works became recognised text-books at a time when Greece and even Italy were but superficially known to English travellers. He was a fellow of the Royal Society and the Society of Antiquaries of London, and a member of the Institute of France and the Royal Academy in Berlin.

His best-known work is Pompeiana; the Topography, Edifices and Ornaments of Pompeii, published between 1817 and 1832, in the first part of which he was assisted by J. P. Gandy. It was followed in 1834 by the Topography of Rome and its Vicinity. He wrote also Topography of Troy and its Vicinity (1804); Geography and Antiquities of Ithaca (1807); Itinerary of Greece, with a Commentary on Pausanias and Strabo (1810); and Itinerary of the Morea (1816). Although these works have been superseded by later publications, they continue to provide valuable information for the study of classical topography. He is, together with his friends Edward Dodwell and Keppel Richard Craven, by some modern scholars seen as the founder of the study of the historical topography of the hinterland of Rome. His works and notebooks proved very valuable for the topographical studies done by Thomas Ashby at the beginning of the 20th century.

== Works ==
- A Tour in the Lakes Made in 1797, [Edited by W. Rollinson, published 1986]
- The Topography of Troy and its vicinity illustrated and explained by drawings and descriptions etc.. London, 1804
- The Geography and Antiquities of Ithaca. London, 1807
- The Itinerary of Greece, with a commentary on Pausanias and Strabo, and an account of the Monuments of Antiquity at present existing in that country, compiled in the years 1801, 2, 5, 6 etc.. London, 1810. [2nd ed. containing a hundred routes in Attica, Boeotia, Phocis, 1827]
- The Itinerary of the Morea, being a description of the Routes of that Peninsula. London, 1817
- Views in Barbary – taken in 1813. London, 1815
- Pompeiana. The Topography of Edifices and Ornaments of Pompeii. 2 vols. London, 1817–8. [New ed. 1824. Further edition by Gell alone incorporating the results of latest excavations. London 1832 and 1852]
- Narrative of a Journey in the Morea. London, 1823
- Le Mura di Roma disegnate sa Sir W. Gell, illustrate con testo e note da A. Nibby. Rome, 1820
- Probestücke von Städtemauern des alten Griechenlands ... Aus dem Englischen übersetzt. Munich, 1831
- The Topography of Rome and its Vicinity with Map. 2 vols. London, 1834. [Rev. and enlarged by Edward Henry Banbury. London 1846]
- Analisi storico-topografico-antiquaria della carta de' dintorni di Roma secondo le osservazione di Sir W. Gell e del professore A. Nibby. Rome 1837 [2nd ed. 1848]
