= English Cemetery, Naples =

Cemetery in Campania, Italy

English Cemetery Il Cimitero acattolico di Santa Maria delle Fede
- Interactive map of English Cemetery; Il Cimitero acattolico di Santa Maria delle Fede

Details
- Established: 1826
- Location: Naples
- Country: Italy
- Coordinates: 40°51′31″N 14°16′08″E
- Type: Protestant
- Owned by: Commune of Naples

The English Cemetery, Il Cimitero degli Inglesi, or more correctly, Il Cimitero acattolico di Santa Maria delle Fede, is located near Piazza Garibaldi, Naples, Italy. It was the final resting place of many Swiss, Germans, Americans, Irish, Scottish and English who lived in Naples, were passing through on the Grand Tour, or were merchants or seamen.

== History ==
The cemetery was the burial place of the (mainly foreign) Protestants who died in Naples, although people of other religions ended up here as well. It was a unique memorial to the foreigners who formed part of the commercial elite of Naples at that time.

The cemetery was closed for burials in 1893 and its maintenance given over to the British consulate. Over the following half-century what was once a romantic memory of the bourgeoisie of 18th-century Naples was scandalously allowed to fall into disrepair. Statues were vandalized and stolen and the entire cemetery became overgrown with weeds and vegetation. At the end of the 1950s the cemetery was donated to the Comune of Naples and a plan was drawn up for the re-utilization of the area. This foresaw the conversion of the cemetery into a public park, retaining some of the memorials as a reminder of the history of the cemetery and those interred in it. However, while most of the remaining land area of the cemetery was retained, only a fraction of the memorials were renovated and preserved, and the original ambience was almost obliterated in the construction of the public park.

Since its re-opening as a park in the early 1990s, some of the remaining memorials have been vandalized.

== Burials and inscriptions ==
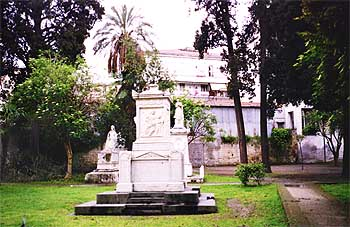
The Von Willer burial plot. Behind, on the left, is the memorial to Mary Somerville.

In 1980 the land was returned by the British Consulate to the comune of Naples, and was made into a park. Almost all the graves were moved to the Cemetery of Poggioreale. However, records remain of those who were buried here in the 19th century, along with some inscriptions. (Note: G.S. Parry writing in 1907 described the cemetery thus "THE old Protestant Cemetery at Naples is divided into two unequal portions by a broad path, running roughly east and west, connecting the two entrance gates. The western gate is reached from a dirty little 'piazza' on the east side of the Corso Garibaldi. The following inscriptions (taken in May last) are all on the north side of the path that is, to the left as one enters by the western gate and are either on or immediately under the north wall" (Parry 1907, p. 62).)

=== Notable burials ===
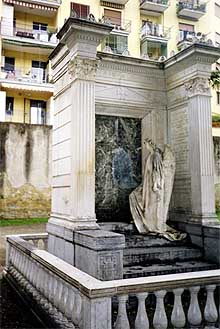
The Freitag burial plot - the grave has been vandalized since this photo was taken.

- Mary Somerville (née Fairfax), Scottish mathematician and theoretical astronomer
- Dionysius Lardner Irish scientific writer
- Anton Sminck van Pitloo (1790–1837), Dutch painter
- William Gell (1777–1836), English archaeologist, traveller and writer
- Keppel Richard Craven (1779–1851), English traveller and dilettante
- Elizabeth Craven, Princess Berkeley and Margravine of Brandenburg-Ansbach (1750–1828), English socialite, playwright and travel writer
- Friedrich Dehnhardt, German botanist

Among others buried here were seven members of the crew of HMS Hannibal, which was used to transport Garibaldi's soldiers. The ship arrived in Naples in July 1860. In November a smallpox epidemic broke out, and in ten days the British admiral reported that ninety men had caught the disease, including himself. A memorial was erected by the crew of HMS Hannibal in memory of their shipmates.
