= Theodore Majocchi =

Witness in 1820 UK royal adultery trial

Theodore Majocchi (fl. 1815–1819) was an Italian servant to Caroline, Princess of Wales, the wife of George, Prince of Wales. After the death of George III in 1820, Prince George became King of the United Kingdom and Hanover, as George IV. Caroline became Queen, but George despised her and sought a divorce by accusing his wife of infidelity. Majocchi appeared as a prosecution witness in her subsequent trial for adultery. Though the foundation of his evidence was held to be true, he was widely suspected of perjury and caricatured.

== Background ==
Majocchi was hired by Caroline's major-domo, Bartolomeo Pergami, as a manservant in 1815 in Naples. By 1818, he had left her service, and in 1819 he gave evidence to the "Milan commission", which had been set up by the Vice-Chancellor John Leach on the instructions of Prince George to gather evidence of Caroline's adultery. George and Caroline had been estranged for many years, and had led separate lives since 1796 but divorce was illegal under English law unless one of the parties could prove adultery.

== Trial ==
By mid-1820, George had inherited the throne from his father, George III, and he felt he had enough evidence to get the Parliament of the United Kingdom to agree to a divorce between him and Caroline. On 5 July, a bill was introduced into Parliament "to deprive Her Majesty Queen Caroline Amelia Elizabeth of the Title, Prerogatives, Rights, Privileges, and Exemptions of Queen Consort of this Realm; and to dissolve the Marriage between His Majesty and the said Caroline Amelia Elizabeth." The bill charged that Caroline had committed adultery with Bartolomeo Pergami, the head servant of her household, and that consequently she had forfeited her rights to be queen consort. The bill was effectively a public trial of the Queen, whereby the government could call witnesses against Caroline, who would be cross-examined by her legal advisors. By voting on the bill, members of the Houses of Parliament would be both jury and judges.

Majocchi was the first witness for the prosecution. The prosecution's reliance on Italian witnesses of low birth led to anti-Italian prejudice in Britain. The witnesses had to be protected from angry mobs, and were depicted in popular prints and pamphlets as venal, corrupt and criminal. Street-sellers sold prints alleging that the Italians had accepted bribes to commit perjury. On 21 August, the day Majocchi's testimony opened, Caroline entered the chamber of the House of Lords. Shortly afterward, Majocchi was called. As he was led in, Caroline rose and advanced towards him, flinging back her veil. She apparently recognised him, exclaimed "Theodore!", and rushed out of the House. Her sudden sensational departure was seen as "burst of agony" by The Times, but others thought it the mark of a guilty conscience. It led her defence team to advise her against attending in future unless specifically requested.

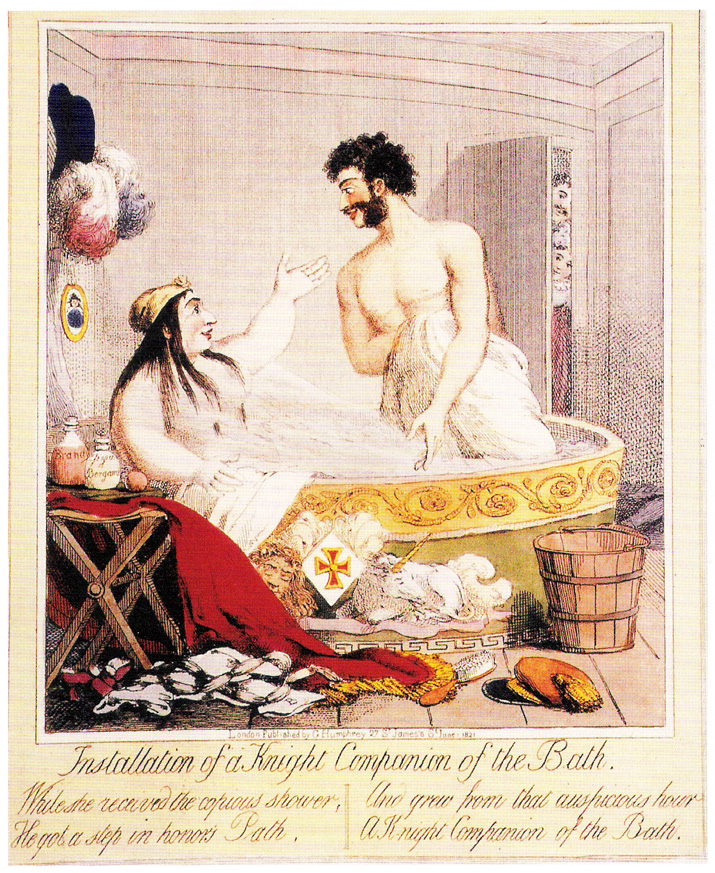
Majocchi implied that Caroline and Pergami had shared a bath. In this contemporary cartoon, Caroline is showered suggestively by a spray of bathwater from Pergami's crotch.

Under examination by the Solicitor General for England and Wales John Singleton Copley, Majocchi testified that Caroline and Pergami eat breakfast together, had adjoining bedrooms, and had kissed each other on the lips. He said Pergami's bed was not always slept in, and he had seen Pergami visit the Queen wearing only underwear and a dressing gown. He said that they had slept in the same tent during a trip around the Mediterranean, and that Pergami had attended the Queen, alone, while she was having a bath. The following day, his astonishing testimony continued with the revelation that when Caroline and Pergami were travelling together in a carriage, Pergami kept a bottle with him so he could relieve himself without having to step down from the coach. The situation in the House became more absurd, as the Solicitor General asked Majocchi about a male exotic dancer employed by Caroline, after which Majocchi demonstrated a dance by pulling up his trousers, extending his arms, clicking his fingers, and shouting "vima dima!", while moving his body up and down in a suggestive fashion. The Times newspaper was disgusted, and informed its readers that it regretted being "obliged" to report "filth of this kind". During Majocchi's cross-examination, conducted by Henry Brougham, Majocchi replied "Non mi ricordo (I don't recall)" more than 200 times. The phrase was repeated so often, it became a national joke, and featured in cartoons and parodies. Majocchi's credibility as a witness was destroyed. Eventually, the bill failed but Caroline died less than a year later. She was excluded from the coronation, and was never crowned.

The examination of Majocchi led to a significant ruling by the Lords on the legal tactic of witness impeachment by use of the witness's prior inconsistent statement which is still studied in classes on the law of evidence to this day.
