= Caroline of Brunswick =

Queen of the United Kingdom and Hanover from 1820 to 1821

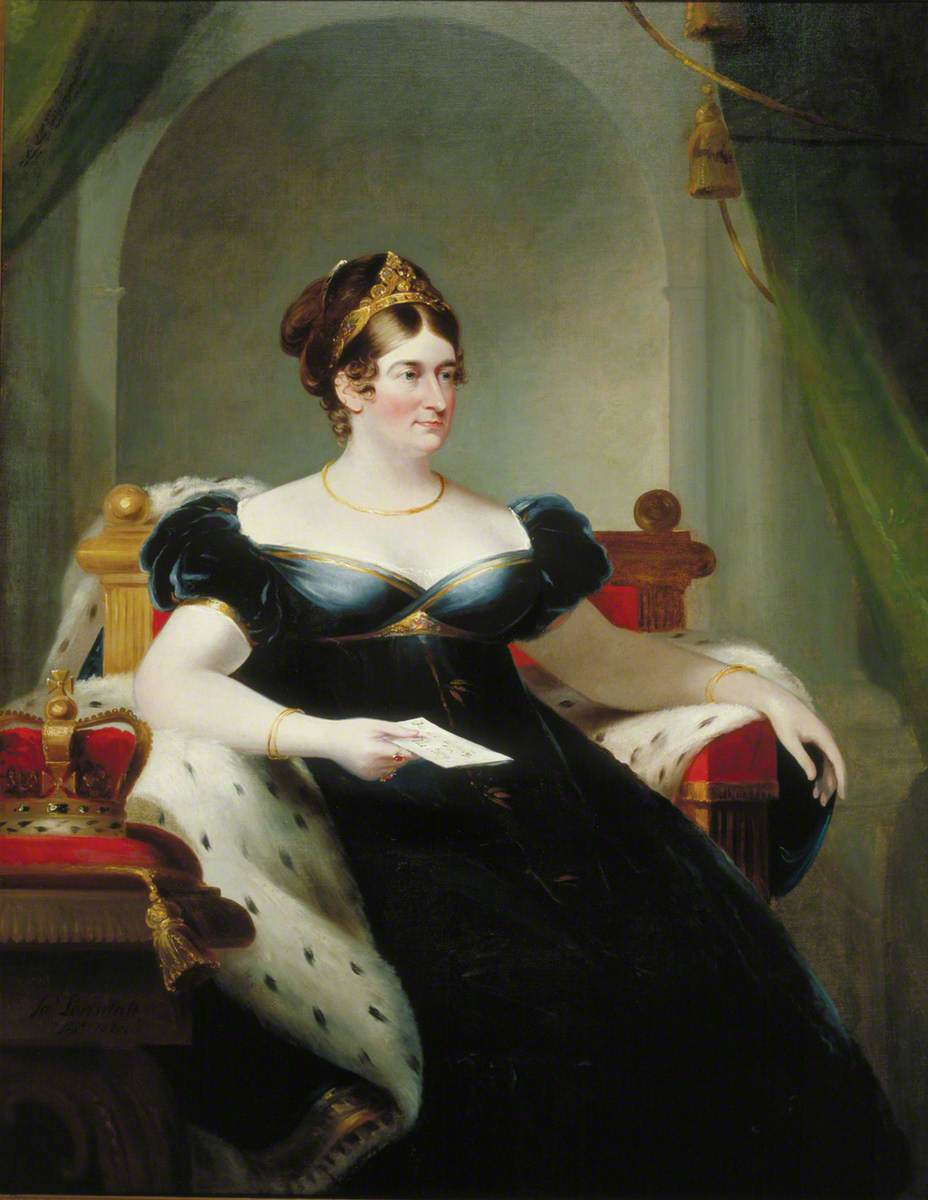
- Portrait by James Lonsdale, 1820

Queen consort of the United Kingdom and Hanover
- Tenure: 29 January 1820 – 7 August 1821
- Born: 17 May 1768; Brunswick, Brunswick-Wolfenbüttel, Holy Roman Empire
- Died: 7 August 1821 (aged 53); Brandenburgh House, Hammersmith, Middlesex, England
- Burial: 25 August 1821; Brunswick Cathedral
- Spouse: George IV (m. 1795)
- Issue: Princess Charlotte of Wales
Names
- Caroline Amelia Elizabeth; German: Caroline Amalie Elisabeth
- House: Brunswick-Bevern
- Father: Charles William Ferdinand, Duke of Brunswick
- Mother: Princess Augusta of Great Britain

Caroline of Brunswick-Wolfenbüttel (Caroline Amelia Elizabeth; 17 May 1768 – 7 August 1821) was Queen of the United Kingdom of Great Britain and Ireland and Queen of Hanover from 29 January 1820 until her death in 1821 as the estranged wife of King George IV. She was Princess of Wales from 1795 to 1820.

The daughter of Charles William Ferdinand, Duke of Brunswick, and Princess Augusta of Great Britain, Caroline was engaged in 1794 to her first cousin George, Prince of Wales, whom she had never met. He was already illegally married to Maria Fitzherbert. George and Caroline married the following year but separated shortly after the birth of their only child, Princess Charlotte, in 1796. By 1806, rumours that Caroline had taken multiple lovers and had an illegitimate child led to an investigation into her private life. The dignitaries who led the investigation concluded that there was "no foundation" to the rumours, but Caroline's access to her daughter was still restricted. In 1814, Caroline moved to Italy, where she employed Bartolomeo Pergami as a servant. Pergami soon became Caroline's closest companion, and it was widely assumed that they were lovers. In 1817, Caroline was devastated when Charlotte died in childbirth. She heard the news from a passing courier as George had refused to write and tell her. He was determined to divorce Caroline and set up a second investigation to collect evidence of her adultery.

In January 1820, George became King of the United Kingdom and Hanover, and Caroline became nominal queen consort. George insisted on a divorce from Caroline, which she refused. A legal divorce was possible but difficult to obtain. Caroline returned to Britain to assert her position as queen. She was wildly popular with the British people, who sympathised with her and despised the new king for his immoral behaviour. On the basis of the loose evidence collected against her, George attempted to divorce Caroline by introducing the Pains and Penalties Bill 1820 to Parliament, but he and the bill were so unpopular and Caroline so popular with the masses that it was withdrawn by the Liverpool ministry. The King barred Caroline from his coronation in July 1821. She fell ill in London and died three weeks later. Her funeral procession passed through London on its way to her native Brunswick, where she was buried in Brunswick Cathedral.

== Early life ==
Caroline was born a princess of Braunschweig, known in English as Brunswick, with the courtesy title of Duchess of Brunswick-Wolfenbüttel, on 17 May 1768 at Braunschweig in Germany. She was the daughter of Charles William Ferdinand, Duke of Brunswick-Wolfenbüttel, and his wife Princess Augusta of Great Britain, eldest sister of King George III. Caroline was brought up in a difficult family situation. Her mother resented her father's open adultery with Baroness Luise von Hertefeld, whom he had installed as his official mistress in 1777, and Caroline was later to confide to Lady Charlotte Campbell that she was often tired of being a "shuttlecock" between her parents, as whenever she was civil to one of them, she was scolded by the other.

She was educated by governesses, but the only subject in which she was given a higher education was music. From 1783 until 1791, Countess Eleonore von Münster was her governess, and won her affection, but never managed to teach her to spell correctly, as Caroline preferred to dictate to a secretary. Caroline could understand English and French, but her father admitted that she was lacking in education. According to Caroline's mother, all German princesses learned English in the hope that they would be chosen to marry George, Prince of Wales, George III's eldest son and heir apparent and Caroline's first cousin.

John Stanley, later 1st Baron Stanley of Alderley, saw her in 1781, and noted that she was an attractive girl with curly, fair hair. In 1784, she was described as a beauty, and two years later, Honoré Gabriel Riqueti, comte de Mirabeau described her as "most amiable, lively, playful, witty and handsome". Caroline was brought up with extremely limited contact with the opposite sex even by the standards of her own time. She was reportedly constantly supervised by her governess and elder ladies, restricted to her room when the family was entertaining and ordered to keep away from the windows. She was normally refused permission to attend balls and court functions, and when allowed, she was forbidden to dance. Abbé Baron commented during the winter of 1789–90: "She is supervised with the greatest severity, as they claim she is already aware of what she is missing. I doubt if the torches of Hymen will illuminate for her [i.e.I think she will never marry]. Although always attired with style and elegance, she is never allowed to dance", and that as soon as the first dance began, she was forced to sit down at the whist table with three old ladies.

A rare occasion was the wedding of her elder brother Charles, when she was finally allowed to dance, though only with the groom and his new brother-in-law, the Prince of Orange – she was, however, still forbidden to dine alone with her brother. Her secluded isolation tormented her, which was demonstrated when she was later again banned from attending a ball. She simulated an illness so severe that her parents left the ball to see her. When they arrived, she claimed to be in labour and forced them to send for a midwife. When the midwife arrived, she stopped her simulation and asked her mother: "Now, Madam, will you keep me another time from a ball?"

Her mother early on favoured a match between one of her children and a member of her English family, and when her nephew Prince Frederick, Duke of York and Albany visited Brunswick in June 1781, she lamented the fact that Caroline, because of her age, could not be present very often. Caroline was given a number of proposals from 1782 onward. Marriage with the Prince of Orange, Prince George of Hesse-Darmstadt, Charles, Duke of Mecklenburg-Strelitz, and the second son of the Margrave of Baden were all suggested, while her mother and father supported an English and a Prussian Prince, respectively, but none came to fruition. Caroline was later to state that her father had forbidden her to marry a man she had fallen in love with because of his low status. The identity of this man is not clear, but contemporaries point out an officer who was referred to at the time as the "Handsome Irishman" who lived in Brunswick, and with whom Caroline was said to have been in love. There was also a rumour that Caroline had given birth at the age of fifteen.

Though she was not allowed to socialise with men, she was allowed to ride, and during riding, she visited the cottages of the peasantry. She had done this already as a child, during which she had met children to play with, and as an adult, one of these visits allegedly led to a pregnancy. There is no confirmation of this rumour, but it was well known during her life, and referred to as a reason why she married at an older age than was usual, despite being regarded as good-looking and having been given so many proposals.

== Engagement ==
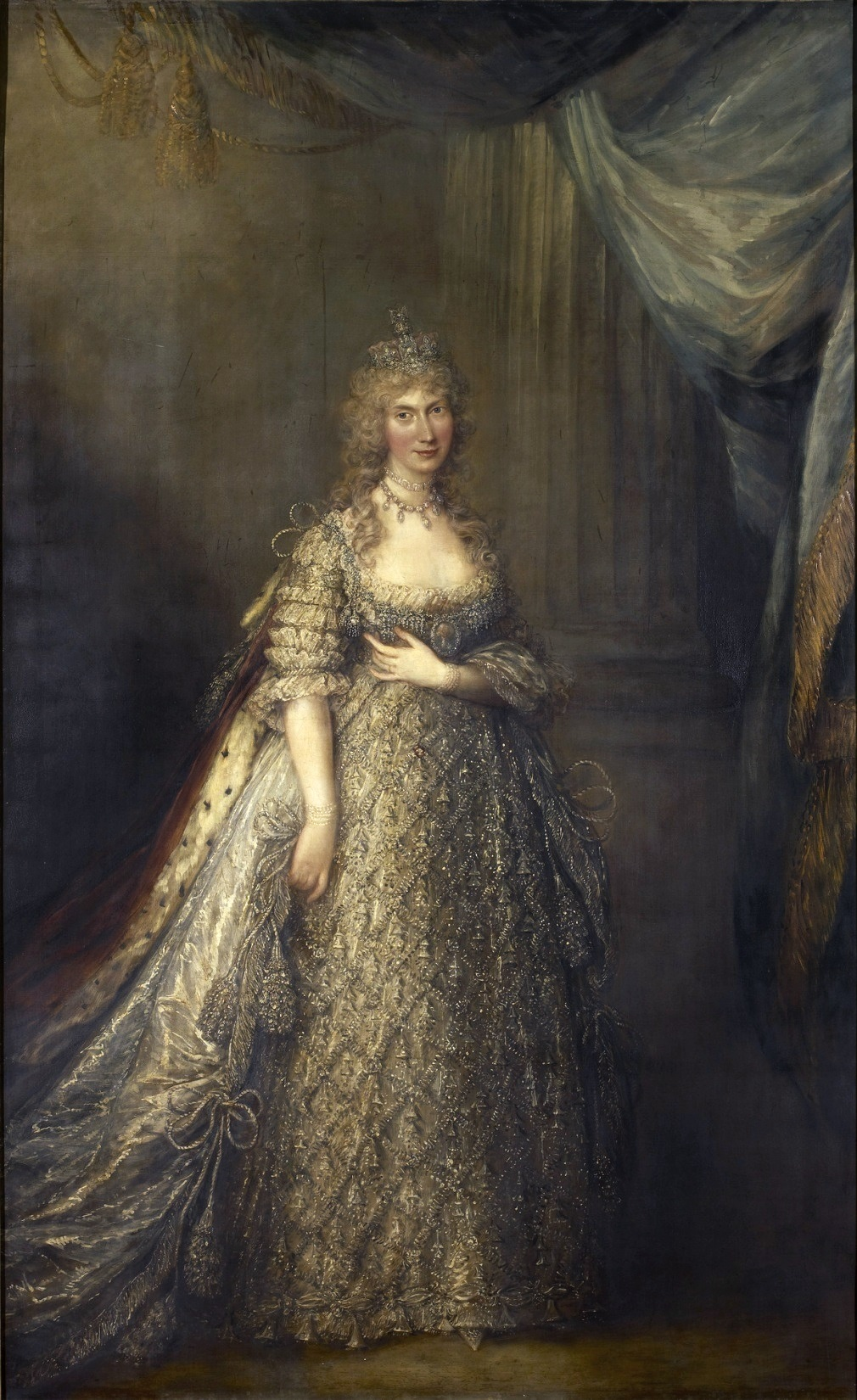
Portrait by Gainsborough Dupont, c. 1795

In 1794, Caroline and the Prince of Wales were engaged. They had never met—George had agreed to marry her because he was heavily in debt, and if he contracted a marriage with an eligible princess, Parliament would increase his allowance. Caroline seemed eminently suitable: she was a Protestant of royal birth, and the marriage would ally Brunswick and Britain. Although Brunswick was only a small country, Britain was at war with revolutionary France and so was eager to obtain allies on the European mainland. On 20 November 1794, Lord Malmesbury arrived at Brunswick to escort Caroline to her new life in Britain. In his diary, Malmesbury recorded his reservations about Caroline's suitability as a bride for the prince: she lacked judgement, decorum and tact, spoke her mind too readily, acted indiscreetly, and often neglected to wash, or change her dirty clothes. He went on to say that she had "some natural but no acquired morality, and no strong innate notions of its value and necessity". However, Malmesbury was impressed by her bravery; on the journey to England, the party heard cannon fire, as they were not far from the French lines. While Caroline's mother, who was accompanying them to the coast as chaperone, was concerned for their safety, Caroline was unfazed.

On 28 March 1795, Caroline and Malmesbury left Cuxhaven on the Jupiter. Delayed by poor weather, they landed a week later, on Easter Sunday, 5 April, at Greenwich. There, she met Frances Villiers, Countess of Jersey, George's mistress, who had been appointed Caroline's Lady of the Bedchamber. Smith concludes that:

She was chosen as the intended bride of George, Prince of Wales partly because her mother was a favourite sister of George III, partly through the favourable reports of her given by his brothers the Dukes of York and Clarence when they visited Germany, and partly for lack of a suitable alternative German Protestant princess.

On meeting his future wife for the first time, George called for a glass of brandy. He was evidently disappointed. Similarly, Caroline told Malmesbury, "[the Prince is] very fat and he's nothing like as handsome as his portrait." At dinner that evening, the Prince was appalled by Caroline's garrulous nature and her gibes at the expense of Lady Jersey. She was upset and disappointed by George's obvious partiality for Lady Jersey over her.

== Troubled marriage ==
Caroline and George were married on 8 April 1795 at the Chapel Royal, St. James's Palace, in London. At the ceremony, George was drunk. He regarded Caroline as unattractive and unhygienic, and told Malmesbury that he suspected that she was not a virgin when they married. He had already undergone a form of marriage with Maria Fitzherbert, but as this violated the Royal Marriages Act 1772, both George and Maria knew it was not legally valid.

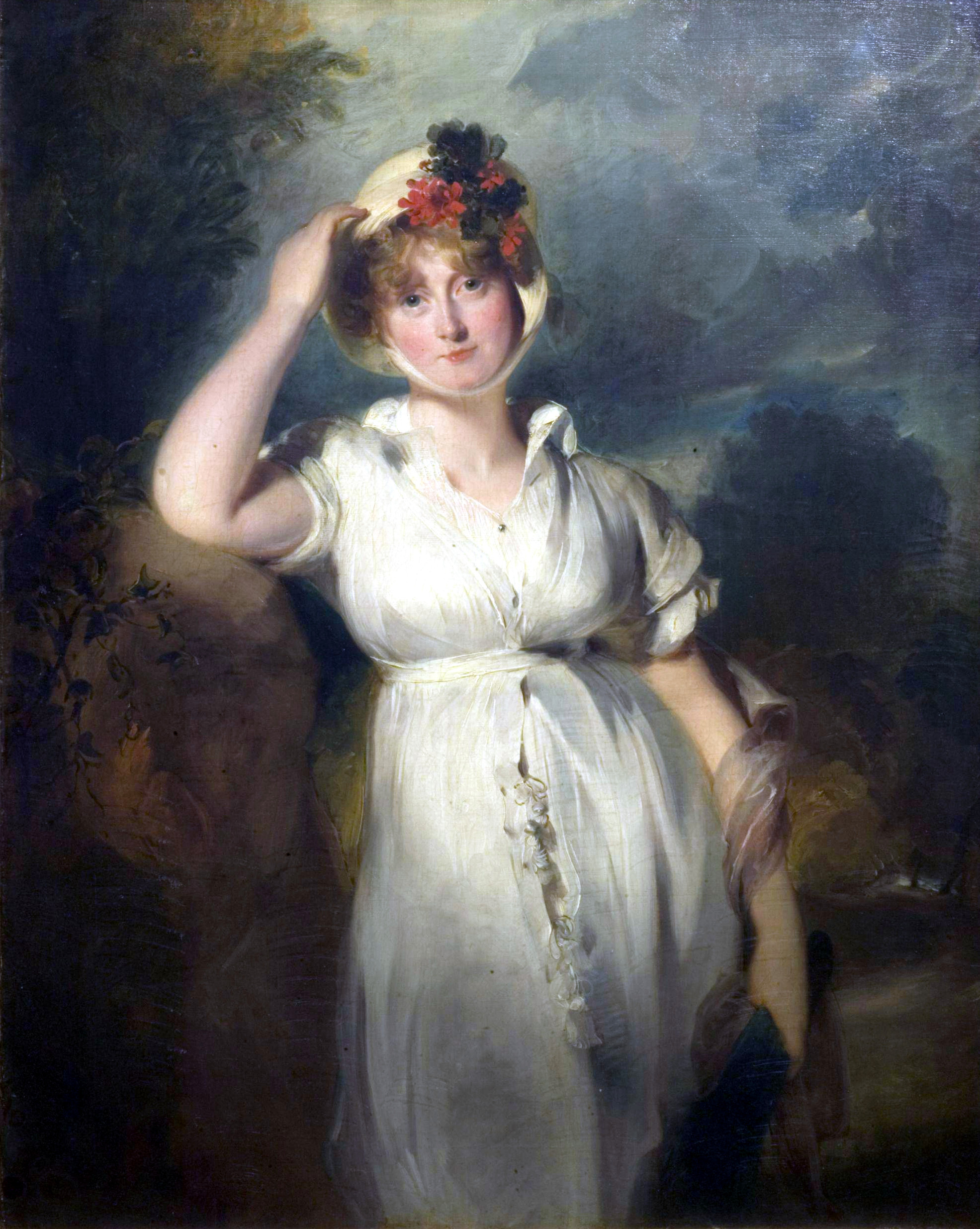
Caroline, Princess of Wales by Sir Thomas Lawrence, 1798

In a letter to a friend, the prince claimed that the couple only had sexual intercourse three times: twice the first night of the marriage, and once the second night. He wrote, "it required no small [effort] to conquer my aversion and overcome the disgust of her person." Caroline claimed George was so drunk that he "passed the greatest part of his bridal night under the grate, where he fell, and where I left him".

Nine months after the wedding, Caroline gave birth to Princess Charlotte, George's only legitimate child, and at that point the king's only legitimate grandchild, at Carlton House on 7 January 1796. Charlotte was second in the line of succession to the British throne after her father. Just three days after Charlotte's birth, George made out a new will. He left all his property to "Maria Fitzherbert, my wife", while to Caroline he left one shilling.

Gossip about Caroline and George's troubled marriage was already circulating. The newspapers claimed that Lady Jersey opened, read and distributed the contents of Caroline's private letters. She despised Lady Jersey and could not visit or travel anywhere without George's permission. The press vilified George for his extravagance and luxury at a time of war and portrayed Caroline as a wronged wife. She was cheered in public and gained plaudits for her "winning familiarity" and easy, open nature. George was dismayed at her popularity and his own unpopularity, and felt trapped in a loveless marriage with a woman he loathed. He wanted a separation. In April 1796, George wrote to Caroline, "We have unfortunately been oblig'd to acknowledge to each other that we cannot find happiness in our union. ... Let me therefore beg you to make the best of a situation unfortunate for us both." In June, Lady Jersey resigned as Caroline's Lady of the Bedchamber. George and Caroline were already living separately, and in August 1797 Caroline moved to a private residence: The Vicarage or Old Rectory in Charlton, London. Later, she moved to Montagu House in Blackheath. No longer constrained by her husband, or, according to rumour, her marital vows, she entertained whomever she pleased. She flirted with Admiral Sir Sidney Smith and Captain Thomas Manby, and may have had a brief relationship with the politician George Canning.

=== Delicate Investigation ===
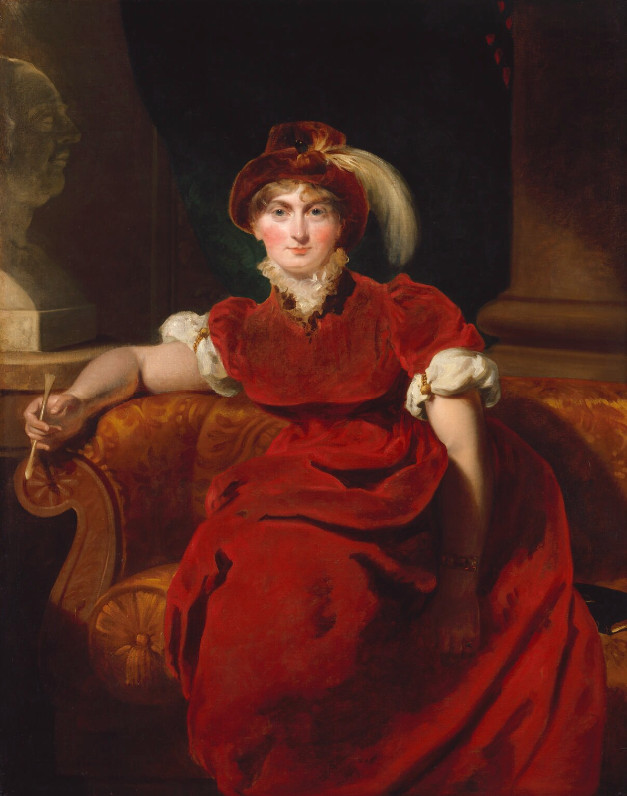
Portrait by Sir Thomas Lawrence, 1804

Charlotte was placed in the care of a governess, in a mansion near Montagu House in the summers, and Caroline visited her often. It seems that a single daughter was not sufficient to sate Caroline's maternal instincts, and she adopted eight or nine poor children who were fostered out to people in the district. In 1802, she adopted a three-month-old boy, William Austin, and took him into her home. By 1805, Caroline had fallen out with her near neighbours, Sir John and Lady Douglas, who claimed that Caroline had sent them obscene and harassing letters. Lady Douglas accused Caroline of infidelity, and alleged that William Austin was Caroline's illegitimate son.

In 1806, a secret commission was set up, known as the "Delicate Investigation", to examine Lady Douglas's claims. The commission comprised four of the most eminent men in the country: Prime Minister Lord Grenville, the Lord Chancellor Lord Erskine, the Lord Chief Justice of England and Wales Lord Ellenborough and the Home Secretary Lord Spencer. Lady Douglas testified that Caroline herself had admitted to her in 1802 that she was pregnant, and that Austin was her son. She further alleged that Caroline had been rude about the royal family, touched her in an inappropriately sexual way, and had admitted that any woman friendly with a man was sure to become his lover. In addition to Smith, Manby and Canning, artist Thomas Lawrence and Henry Hood, son of Lord Hood, were also mentioned as potential paramours. Caroline's servants could or would not confirm that these men were her lovers, nor that she had been pregnant, and said that the child had been brought to Caroline's house by his true mother, Sophia Austin. Sophia was summoned before the commissioners, and testified that the child was hers.

Candid miniature portrait of Princess Caroline (of Brunswick) painted by Eduard Stroely ca. 1804

The commissioners decided that there was "no foundation" for the allegations, but despite being a supposedly secret investigation, it proved impossible to prevent gossip from spreading, and news of the investigation leaked to the press. Caroline's conduct with her male friends was considered improper, but there was no direct proof that she had been guilty of anything more than flirtation. Perhaps Caroline had told Lady Douglas that she was pregnant out of frustrated maternal desire, or as part of a foolish prank that, unfortunately for her, backfired. Later in the year, Caroline received further bad news as Brunswick was overrun by the French, and her father was killed in the battle of Jena-Auerstadt. Her mother and brother, Frederick William, Duke of Brunswick-Wolfenbüttel, fled to England. Caroline had wanted to return to Brunswick and leave Britain behind her, but with much of Europe controlled by the French she had no safe haven to run to.

During the Delicate Investigation, Caroline was not permitted to see her daughter, and afterwards her visits were essentially restricted to once a week and only in the presence of Caroline's own mother, the Dowager Duchess of Brunswick. Meetings took place at either Blackheath or an apartment in Kensington Palace designated for Caroline's use.

=== Social isolation ===
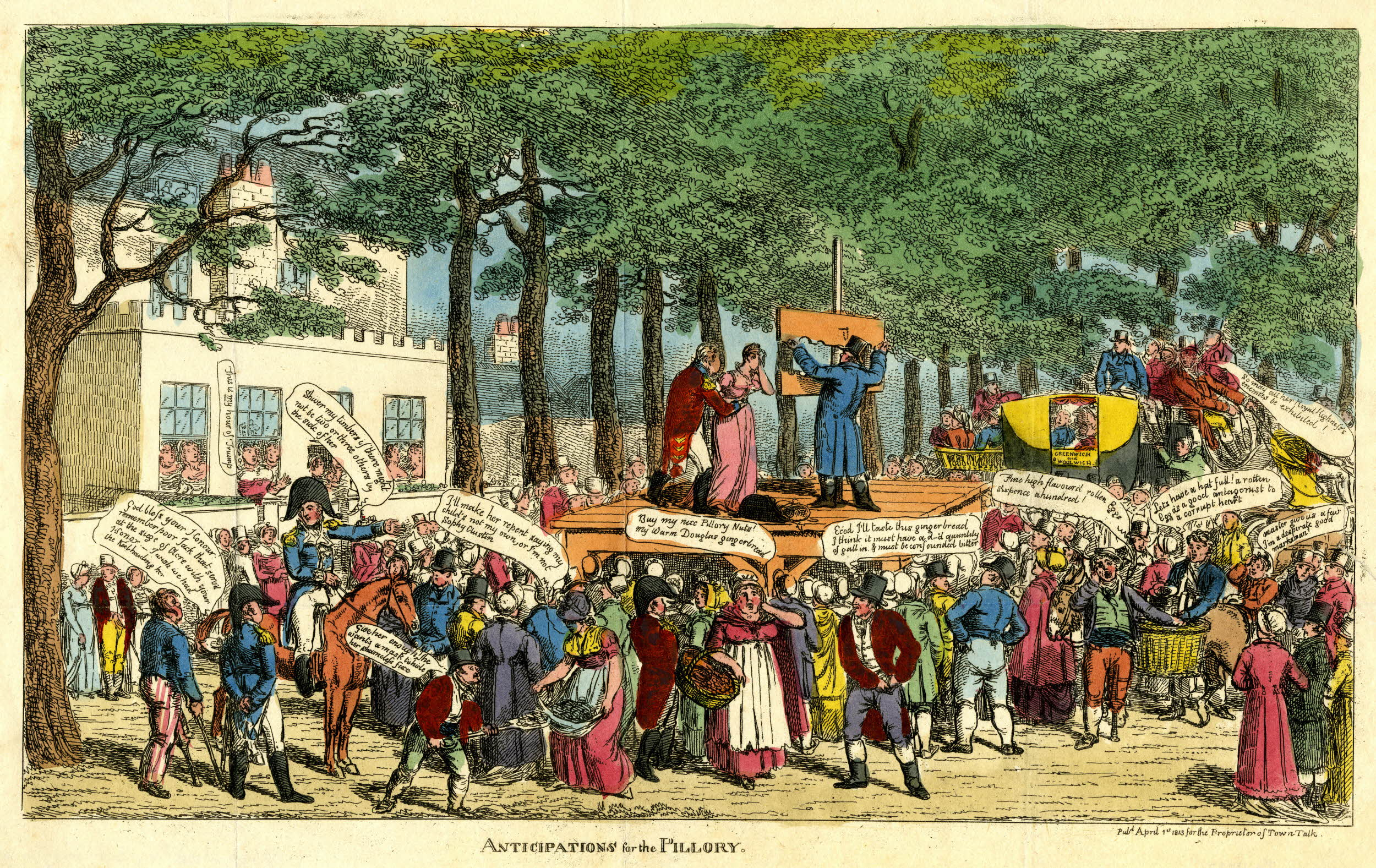
Satirical cartoon showing Sir John and Lady Douglas being led to the pillory outside Montagu House, Blackheath, after being discredited in giving evidence against Caroline

By the end of 1811, King George III had become permanently insane, and the Prince of Wales was appointed regent. He restricted Caroline's access to Princess Charlotte further, and Caroline became more socially isolated as members of high society chose to patronise George's extravagant parties rather than hers. She moved her London residence to Connaught House in Bayswater. Caroline needed a powerful ally to help her oppose George's increasing ability to prevent her from seeing her daughter. In league with Henry Brougham, an ambitious Whig politician who favoured reform, she began a propaganda campaign against George. George countered by leaking Lady Douglas's testimony from the "Delicate Investigation", which Brougham repudiated by leaking the testimonies of the servants and Mrs Austin. Charlotte favoured her mother's point of view, as did most of the public. Jane Austen wrote of Caroline: "Poor woman, I shall support her as long as I can, because she is a Woman and because I hate her Husband."

In 1814, after Napoleon's defeat, nobility from throughout Europe attended celebrations in London, but Caroline was excluded. George's relationship with his daughter was also deteriorating, as Charlotte sought greater freedom from her father's strictures. On 12 July, he informed Charlotte that she would henceforth be confined at Cranbourne Lodge, Windsor, that her household would be replaced, and that she could have no visitors except her grandmother Queen Charlotte once a week. Horrified, Princess Charlotte ran away to her mother's house in Bayswater. After an anxious night, Charlotte was eventually persuaded to return to her father by Brougham, since legally she could be placed in her father's care and there was a danger of public disorder against George, which might prejudice Charlotte's position if she continued to disobey him.

Caroline, unhappy at her situation and treatment in Britain, negotiated a deal with the Foreign Secretary, Lord Castlereagh. She agreed to leave the country in exchange for an annual allowance of £35,000. Both Brougham and Charlotte were dismayed by Caroline's decision, as they both realised that Caroline's absence would strengthen George's power and weaken theirs. On 8 August 1814, Caroline left Britain.

== Exile ==
After a two-week visit to Brunswick, Caroline headed for Italy through Switzerland. Along the way, possibly in Milan, she hired Bartolomeo Pergami as a servant. Pergami soon rose to the head of Caroline's household, and managed to get his sister, Angelica, Countess of Oldi, appointed as Caroline's lady-in-waiting. In mid-1815, Caroline bought a house, Villa d'Este, on the shores of Lake Como, even though her finances were stretched.

From early 1816, she and Pergami went on a cruise around the Mediterranean, visiting Napoleon's former palace on Elba, and Sicily, where Pergami obtained the Order of Malta and a barony. By this time, Caroline and Pergami were openly eating together, and it was widely rumoured that they were lovers. They visited Tunis, Malta, Milos, Athens, Corinth, Constantinople, and Nazareth. Caroline entered Jerusalem riding on a donkey in a convoy of camels. Pergami was made a Knight of the Order of Saint Lazarus. Caroline instituted the Order of Saint Caroline, nominating Pergami its Grand Master. In August, they returned to Italy, stopping at Rome to visit Pope Pius VII.

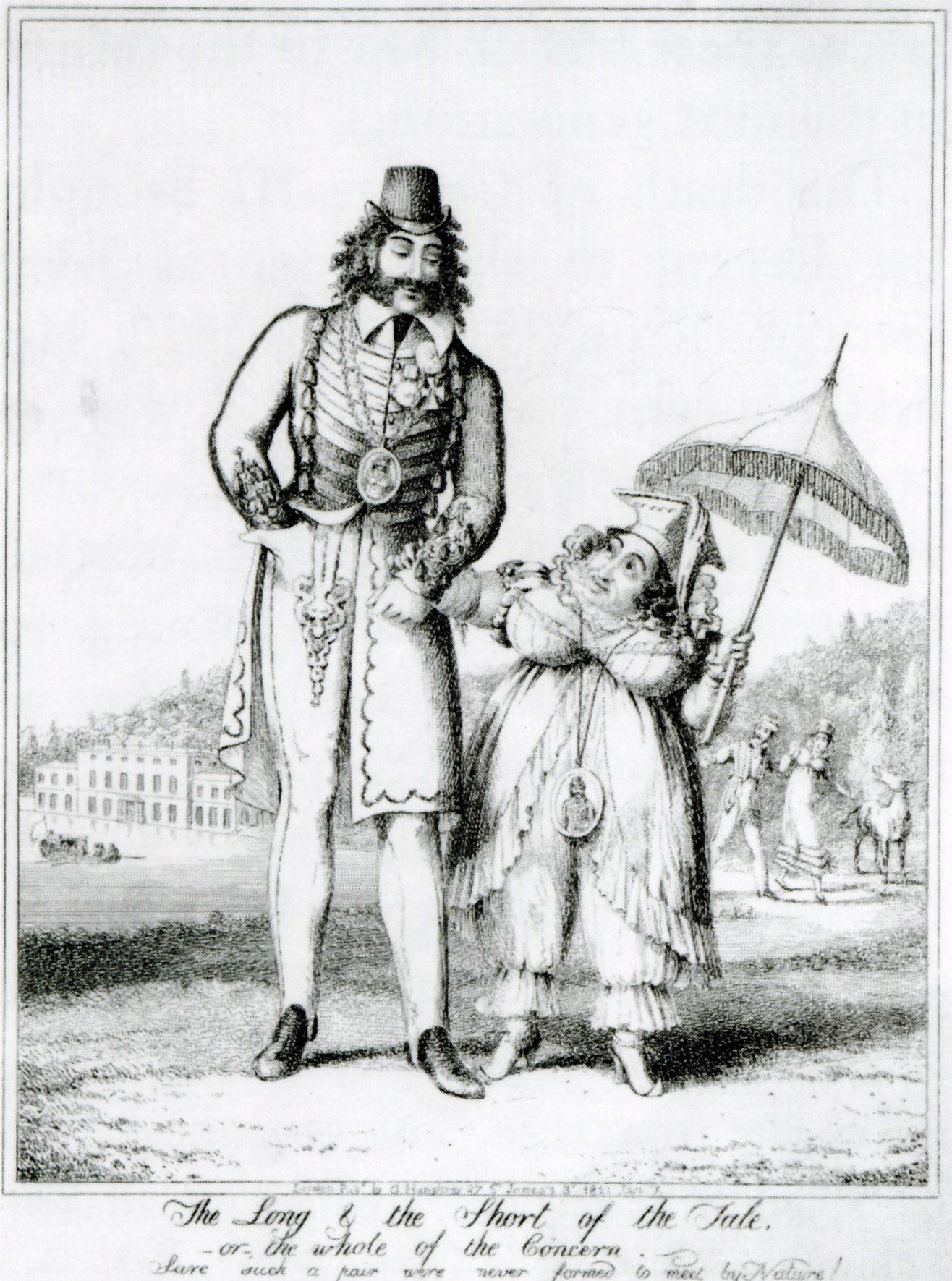
A caricature by George Cruikshank mocking Caroline for her supposed affair with Pergami

By this time, gossip about Caroline was everywhere. Lord Byron wrote to his publisher that Caroline and Pergami were lovers, and Sir Francis Ronalds described and made a sketch of their sleeping arrangements in Karlsruhe. Baron Friedrich Ompteda, a Hanoverian spy, bribed one of Caroline's servants so that he could search her bedroom for proof of adultery. He found none. By August 1817, Caroline's debts were growing, so she sold Villa d'Este and moved to the smaller Villa Caprile near Pesaro. Pergami's mother, brother and daughter, but not his wife, joined Caroline's household.

The previous year, Caroline's daughter, Princess Charlotte, had married Prince Leopold of Saxe-Coburg-Saalfeld, and the future of the British monarchy looked bright. Then tragedy struck: in November 1817, Charlotte died after giving birth to her only child, a stillborn son. For the most part, Charlotte had been immensely popular with the public, and her death was a blow to the country. George refused to write to Caroline to inform her, leaving it for their son-in-law Leopold to do, but Leopold was deep in grief and delayed writing. George did, however, write to the Pope of the tragedy, and by chance the courier carrying the letter passed by Pesaro, and so it was that Caroline heard the devastating news. Caroline had lost her daughter, but she had also lost any chance of regaining position through the succession of her daughter to the throne.

George was determined to press ahead with a divorce and set up a commission chaired by the Vice-Chancellor John Leach to gather evidence of Caroline's adultery. Leach sent three commissioners to Milan to interrogate Caroline's former servants, including Theodore Majocchi and Caroline's maid, Louise Demont. In London, Brougham was still acting as Caroline's agent. Concerned that the "Milan commission" might threaten Caroline, he sent his brother James to Caroline's villa in the hope of establishing whether George had any grounds for divorce. James wrote back to his brother of Caroline and Pergami, "they are to all appearances man and wife, never was anything so obvious." The Milan commission was assembling more and more evidence, and by 1819 Caroline was worried. She informed James Brougham that she would agree to a divorce in exchange for money. However, at this time in England divorce by mutual consent was illegal; it was only possible to divorce if one of the partners admitted or was found guilty of adultery. Caroline said it was "impossible" for her to admit that, so the Broughams advised that only formal separation was possible. Both keen to avoid publicity, the Broughams and the Government discussed a deal where Caroline would be called by a lesser title, such as "Duchess of Cornwall" rather than "Princess of Wales". As the negotiations continued at the end of 1819, Caroline travelled to France, which gave rise to speculation that she was on her way back to England. In January 1820, however, she made plans to return to Italy, but then on 29 January 1820 George III died. Caroline's husband became king and, at least nominally, she was queen of the United Kingdom.

== Queen consort ==
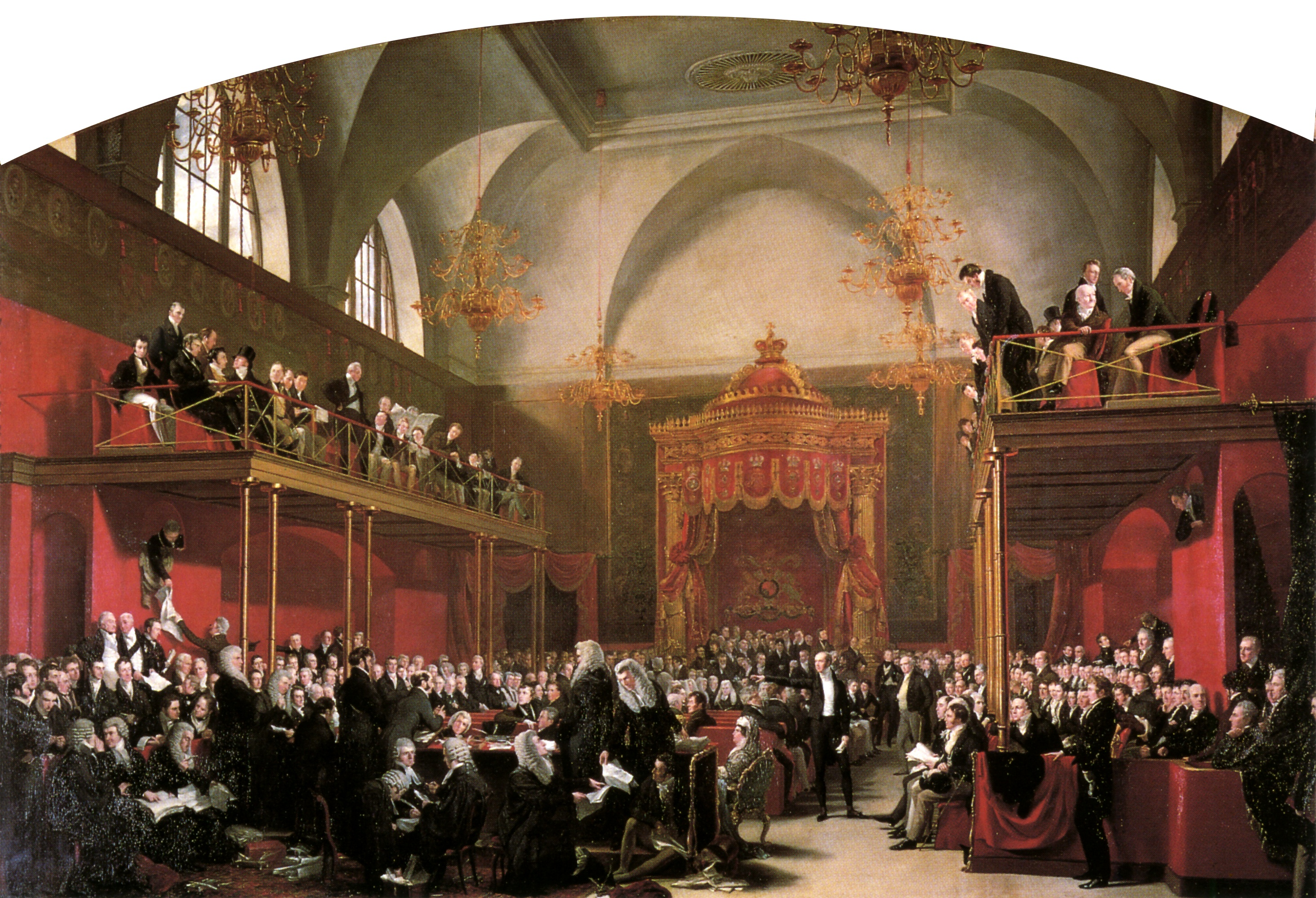
The Trial of Queen Caroline, 1820 by Sir George Hayter

Instead of being treated like a queen, Caroline found that her estranged husband's accession paradoxically made her position worse. On visiting Rome, Pope Pius VII refused her an audience, and the Pope's minister Cardinal Consalvi insisted that she be greeted only as a duchess of Brunswick, and not as a queen. In an attempt to assert her rights, she made plans to return to Britain. The King demanded that his ministers get rid of her. He successfully persuaded them to remove her name from the liturgy of the Church of England, but they would not agree to a divorce because they feared the effect of a public trial. The government was weak and unpopular, and a trial detailing salacious details of both Caroline's and George's separate love lives was certain to destabilise it further. Rather than run the risk, the government entered into negotiations with Caroline, and offered her an increased annuity of £50,000 if she stayed abroad.

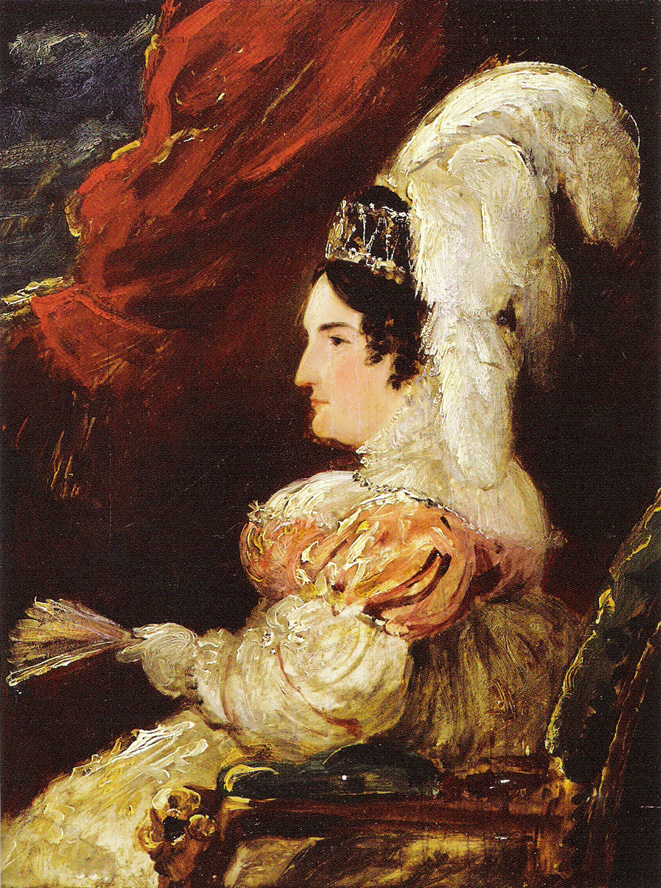
Queen Caroline sitting in a chair in profile at her trial in the House of Lords. She is wearing an elaborate headdress with large feathers, a style with which she became associated.

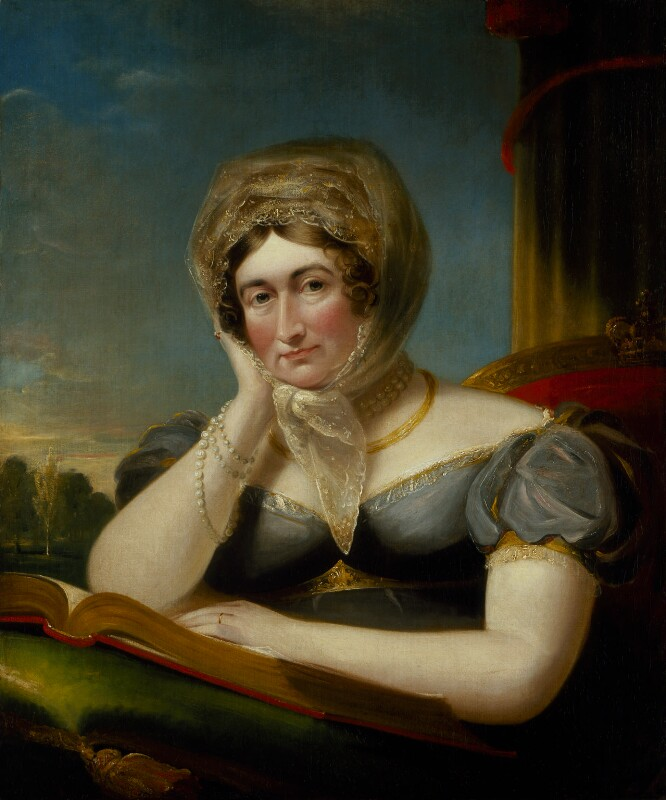
Portrait c. 1820 by James Lonsdale, "Principal Painter in Ordinary to the Queen". Her wedding ring is displayed prominently to emphasise fidelity to marriage vows.

By the beginning of June 1820, Caroline had travelled north from Italy, and was at St Omer near Calais. Acting on the advice of Alderman Matthew Wood and her lady-in-waiting Lady Anne Hamilton, she rejected the government's offer. She bade farewell to Pergami, and embarked for England. When she arrived on 5 June, riots broke out in support of her. Caroline was a figurehead for the growing Radical movement that demanded political reform and opposed the unpopular king. Nevertheless, the King still adamantly desired a divorce and, the following day, he submitted the evidence gathered by the Milan commission to Parliament in two green bags. On 15 June the guards in the King's Mews mutinied. The mutiny was contained, but the government was fearful of further unrest. Examination of the bags of evidence was delayed as Parliament debated the form of the investigation, but eventually, on 27 June, they were opened and examined in secret by 15 peers. The peers considered the contents scandalous, and a week later, after their report to the House, the government introduced a bill in Parliament, the Pains and Penalties Bill 1820, to strip Caroline of the title of queen and dissolve her marriage. It was claimed that Caroline had committed adultery with a low-born man: Bartolomeo Pergami, her servant. Various witnesses, such as Theodore Majocchi, were called during the reading of the bill, which was effectively a public trial of the Queen. The trial caused a sensation, as details of Caroline's familiarity with Pergami were revealed. Witnesses said the couple had slept in the same room, kissed, and been seen together in a state of undress. The bill passed the House of Lords, but was not submitted to the House of Commons as there was little prospect that the Commons would pass it. To her friends Caroline joked that she had indeed committed adultery once—with the husband of Mrs. Fitzherbert, the King.

Even during the trial, the Queen remained immensely popular, as witnessed by over 800 petitions and nearly a million signatures that favoured her cause. As a figurehead of the opposition movement demanding reform, many revolutionary pronouncements were made in Caroline's name.

All classes will ever find in me a sincere friend to their liberties, and a zealous advocate of their rights.

— Queen Caroline, September 1820, quoted in Robins, p. 240

A government cannot stop the march of intellect any more than they can arrest the motion of the tides or the course of the planets.

— Queen Caroline quoted in The Times, 7 October 1820

But with the end of the trial, her alliance with the radicals came to an end. The government again extended the offer of £50,000 a year, this time without preconditions, and Caroline accepted.

On 5 May 1821, Napoleon died on St Helena. Sir Edmund Nagle informed George, "Sir, your bitterest enemy is dead". He replied, "Is she, by God!".

Despite the King's best attempts, Caroline retained a strong popularity among the masses, and pressed ahead with plans to attend the coronation service on 19 July 1821 as queen. Lord Liverpool told Caroline that she should not go to the service, but she turned up anyway. George had Caroline turned away from the coronation at the doors of Westminster Abbey. Refused entry at both the doors to the East Cloister and the doors to the West Cloister, Caroline attempted to enter via Westminster Hall, where many guests were gathered before the service began. A witness described how the Queen stood at the door fuming as bayonets were held under her chin until the deputy lord chamberlain had the doors slammed in her face. Caroline then proceeded back to an entrance near Poets' Corner, where she was met by Sir Robert Inglis, who held the office of "Gold Staff". Inglis persuaded her to return to her carriage, and she left. Caroline lost support through her exhibition at the coronation; the crowds jeered her as she rode away, and even Brougham recorded his distaste at her undignified behaviour.

== Death ==
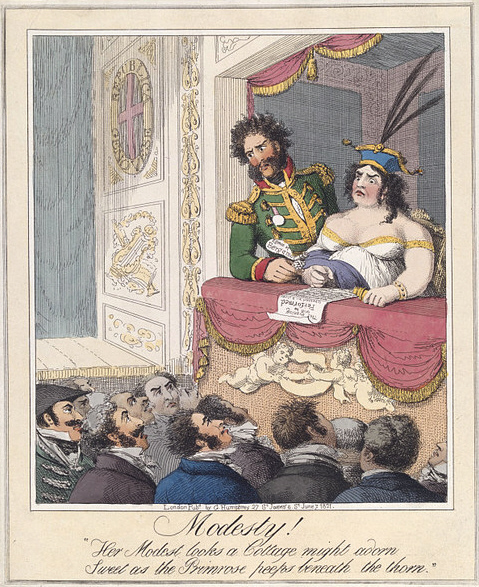
Modesty!, etching published by G. Humphrey, London, 1821: Caroline of Brunswick, at a theatre in Genoa, with her secretary and constant companion Bartolomeo Pergami

The night following Caroline's failed attempt to attend her husband's coronation, she fell ill and took a large dose of milk of magnesia and some drops of laudanum. Over the next three weeks, she suffered more and more pain as her condition deteriorated. She realised she was nearing death and put her affairs in order. Her papers, letters, memoirs, and notebooks were burned. She wrote a new will, and settled her funeral arrangements: she was to be buried in her native Brunswick in a tomb bearing the inscription "Here lies Caroline, the Injured Queen of England". She died at Brandenburgh House in Hammersmith at 10:25 pm on 7 August 1821 at the age of 53. Her physicians thought she had an intestinal obstruction, but she may have had cancer, and there were rumours at the time that she had been poisoned.

Afraid that a procession of the funeral bier through London could spark public unrest, Lord Liverpool decided the Queen's cortège would avoid the city, passing to the north on the way to Harwich and Brunswick. The crowd accompanying the procession was incensed and blocked the intended route with barricades to force a new route through Westminster and London. The scene soon descended into chaos; the soldiers forming the honour guard opened fire and rode through the crowd with drawn sabres. People in the crowd threw cobblestones and bricks at the soldiers, and two members of the public—Richard Honey, a carpenter, and George Francis, a bricklayer—were killed. Eventually, Chief Metropolitan Magistrate Sir Robert Baker ordered that the official route be abandoned, and the cortège passed through the city. As a result, Baker was dismissed from office.

The final route (in heavy rain) took the following course: Hammersmith, Kensington (blocked), Kensington Gore (blocked), Hyde Park, Park Lane (blocked), return to Hyde Park where soldiers forced the gates open, Cumberland Gate (blocked), Edgware Road, Tottenham Court Road, Drury Lane, the Strand, and from there through the City of London, then by way of Romford and Chelmsford to Colchester. The coffin was kept overnight at St Peter's Church, Colchester, where Caroline's executors tried unsuccessfully to replace the official inscription plate with one including the phrase "Injured Queen of England". The next day, the coffin was taken to the seaport of Harwich, and placed on a ship bound for Germany. Brunswick Cathedral is Caroline's final resting place.

== Legacy ==
The American historian Thomas W. Laqueur emphasises that the sordid royal squabble captivated all Britons:

During much of 1820 the "queen's business" captivated the nation. "It was the only question I have ever known," wrote the radical critic William Hazlitt, "that excited a thorough popular feeling. It struck its roots into the heart of the nation; it took possession of every house or cottage in the kingdom."

In 1822, the publishers of the newspaper John Bull were found guilty over a series of libels published in the Queen's lifetime, including one that alluded to her as "a shameless woman". It was alleged the libels had embittered the Queen and shortened her life.

Caroline was the subject of Richard Condon's 1977 novel The Abandoned Woman. The story of the royal marriage and Caroline's battle to be recognised as queen served as the basis for the 1996 BBC docudrama A Royal Scandal with Susan Lynch as Caroline and Richard E. Grant as George IV. The 2008 radio play The People's Princess, with Alex Jennings as George IV and Rebecca Saire as Caroline, drew parallels with the marriage and divorce of Charles, Prince of Wales (later Charles III), and Diana, Princess of Wales.

== Arms ==
Caroline's arms, used from 1820

The royal coat of arms of the United Kingdom are impaled with her father's arms as Duke of Brunswick. The arms were Quarterly of twelve, 1st, Or, a semé of hearts Gules, a lion rampant Azure (Lüneburg); 2nd, Gules, two lions passant guardant Or (Brunswick); 3rd, Azure, a lion rampant Argent crowned Or (Eberstein); 4th, Gules a lion rampant Or, within a border componé Argent and Azure (Homburg); 5th, Or, a lion rampant Gules crowned Azure (Diepholz); 6th, Gules, a lion rampant Or (Lauterberg); 7th, Per fess, in chief Or, two bears' paws erect Sable (Hoya), in the base a gyronny, Argent and Azure (Old Bruckhausen); 8th, Azure, an eagle displayed Argent, langued, beaked and membered Gules (Diepholz eagle); 9th, Chequy Argent and Gules (Hohnstein); 10th, Argent, a stag's attire in bend Gules (Regenstein); 11th, Argent, a stag trippant Sable (Klettenberg); 12th, Argent, a stag's attire in bend sinister Sable (Blankenburg).

As Princess of Wales she used the arms of her husband (the royal arms with a label of three points Argent) impaled with those of her father, the whole surmounted by a coronet of the heir apparent.

== Ancestry ==
Ancestors of Caroline of Brunswick

8. Ferdinand Albert II, Duke of Brunswick-Wolfenbüttel
4. Charles I, Duke of Brunswick-Wolfenbüttel
9. Duchess Antoinette of Brunswick-Wolfenbüttel
2. Charles William Ferdinand, Duke of Brunswick
10. Frederick William I of Prussia
5. Princess Philippine Charlotte of Prussia
11. Princess Sophia Dorothea of Hanover
1. Princess Caroline of Brunswick
12. George II of Great Britain
6. Frederick, Prince of Wales
13. Princess Caroline of Brandenburg-Ansbach
3. Princess Augusta of Great Britain
14. Frederick II, Duke of Saxe-Gotha-Altenburg
7. Princess Augusta of Saxe-Gotha-Altenburg
15. Princess Magdalena Augusta of Anhalt-Zerbst

Caroline of Brunswick House of Brunswick-Bevern Cadet branch of the House of Welf Born: 17 May 1768 Died: 7 August 1821
British royalty
Vacant Title last held by Charlotte of Mecklenburg-Strelitz	Queen consort of the United Kingdom and Hanover; 1820–1821	Vacant Title next held by Adelaide of Saxe-Meiningen
