= Henry Hood, 2nd Viscount Hood =

British politician

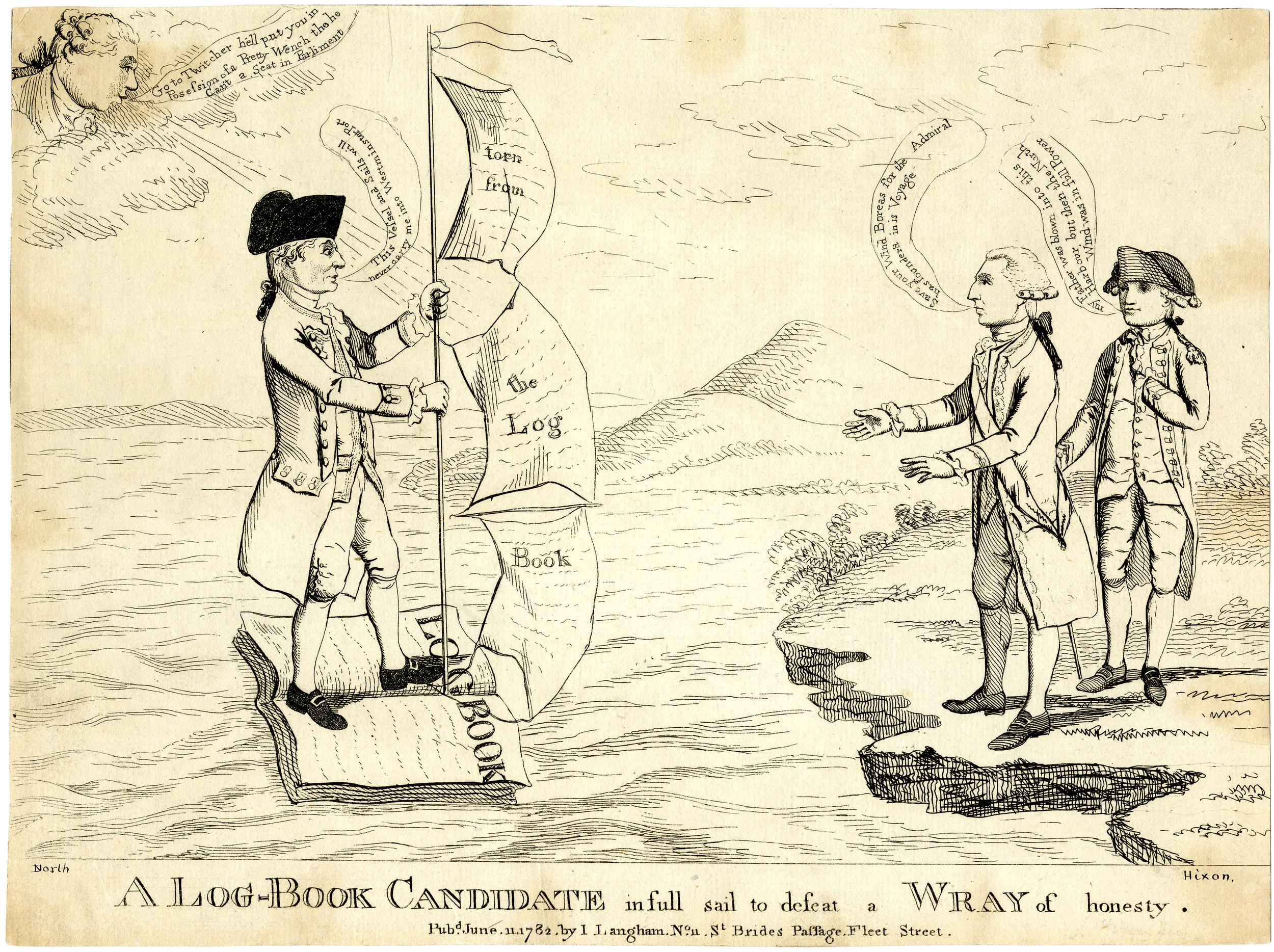
Satirical print on the 1782 Westminster by-election, with the figure on the far right meant for Henry Hood, the figure on the water Sir Samuel Hood, and Lord North (upper left) shown backing Samuel Hood

Henry Hood, 2nd Viscount Hood (25 August 1753 – 25 January 1836) was a British military officer and politician. He is known for his relationship with Caroline of Brunswick.

Hood served in the British Army from 1769 until 1777, discharged with the rank of lieutenant in the 4th Dragoons. He gained the Irish Peerage title of Baron Hood of Catherington in 1782, and he was elected as a Member of Parliament in the Parliament of Great Britain in 1784. He served in the Royal Navy during the War of the First Coalition, and was briefly appointed Admiral of the Blue in 1795. He was relieved of his naval command due to supposed insubordination. He subsequently served as the Governor of Greenwich Hospital. He commanded two units of volunteer militia between 1799 and 1801.

Hood became part of Caroline's social circle in the early 1800s, and he eventually became her lover. In 1820, he became Caroline's Chamberlain and took charge of her household. In 1821, he accompanied Caroline in her failed attempt to gain admission to the coronation of George IV, Caroline's estranged husband. They were both denied entrance in Westminster Abbey.

== Life ==
He was the third son of Samuel Hood, 1st Viscount Hood, a naval officer, and his wife Susannah Linzee; his elder brothers Samuel and Thomas died young.

An early military career began in 1769, when, named as Henry Hood, Gent., he entered the 64th Foot by purchase, as ensign. It ended in 1777 when he left the 4th Dragoons, where he had been a lieutenant.

=== Family politics and titles ===
In 1782, Henry Hood was the political manager for his father's candidature in a by-election for Westminster. It was caused by the elevation of Sir Samuel Hood's naval colleague George Rodney to the House of Lords. There was stiff opposition, with Cecil Wray backed by Charles James Fox prevailing. Sir Samuel at the time was at sea, with Rodney, participating in naval battles of the American Revolutionary War. Later in 1782 he became Baron Hood of Catherington, in the Peerage of Ireland, a title that could be held by Members of the Westminster Parliament. In 1784 he was elected at Westminster, ahead of Fox and Wray.

Having played a prominent part in naval operations of the War of the First Coalition, Lord Hood returned to Great Britain in 1794 and was made Admiral of the Blue in 1795; only to be relieved of his naval command by George Spencer, 2nd Earl Spencer, who found his intriguing for ships insubordinate. The Hood family was on good terms with the political Pitt and Grenville families, but Earl Spencer had replaced John Pitt, 2nd Earl of Chatham, at the Admiralty. Political recognition for Hood's efforts came first by the creation in 1795 of a suo jure barony for Susannah, Lady Hood, in the Peerage of Great Britain. Lord Hood became Governor of Greenwich Hospital, a position in the gift of the King, which marked the end of his naval career. He did not stand for the Westminster seat in the 1796 British general election, and went to the House of Lords that year, with a further title in the Peerage of Great Britain (a viscountcy). These titles then came to Henry Hood from his parents, on their respective deaths in 1806 and 1816.

=== Commoner ===
In 1798, Henry Hood became Major Commandant of the Finchdean Volunteers. By 1801, he commanded a second body of volunteer militia in east Hampshire, the Portsdown Cavalry, raised in 1799.

Around 1800, Princess Caroline took up residence at Montagu House, Blackheath, across Greenwich Park from Greenwich Hospital. There she built up a social group that included Lord Hood, as well as Thomas Manby, Sidney Smith, Amelius Beauclerk and George Canning. It was noticed in 1805 that Henry Hood visited the Princess there. He at some point became her lover.

==== Catherington House ====
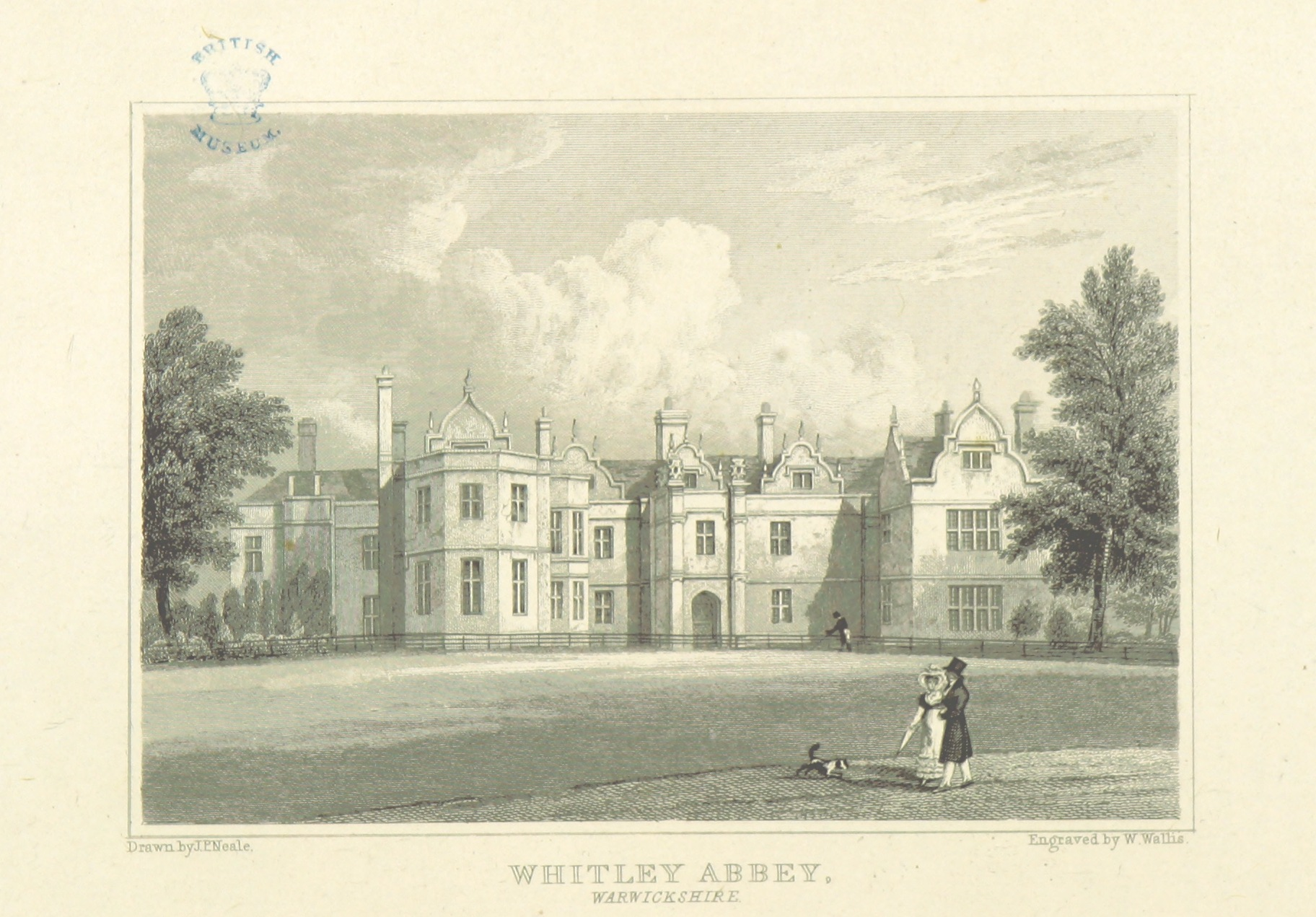
Whitley Abbey, Warwickshire, 1818 engraving, which came to Henry Hood by his marriage

Catherington, albeit the seat chosen by Lord Hood for his Irish peerage, is a Hampshire village. He built Catherington House near there, in what is now Horndean. Hood began by leasing a farmhouse in 1764, which he enlarged over time, and used to entertain. The leased land attached to the house changed hands, passing from Henry Somerset, 5th Duke of Beaufort to Jervoise Clarke Jervoise in 1774.

Princess Caroline decided to stay in the area, for the month of August 1805. It caused some temporary fashion, with hunting boxes in demand in the neighbourhood, such as at Blendworth; and for the Powlett Hounds. Hester Lisle, the lady-in-waiting accompanying the Princess, wrote to her daughter Marcia Arbuthnot from Catherington on 19 August. The Princess had made a swift carriage journey there, and went out for long expeditions:

"Perhaps you would like to know what sort of a place this is; it's a very comfortable Gentleman's House, but very retired. However, we are seldom in it. Mr. Hood is fortunately in the Neighbourhood, for, as the Princess has not any male attendant, 'tis fortunate there should be a Gentleman who will take the trouble of attending our flying excursions ...

The following year, Lisle's deposition to the "Delicate Investigation" mentioned excursions of the Princess with Henry Hood and his servant alone, in a whisky, of several hours duration.

=== Baron and Viscount ===
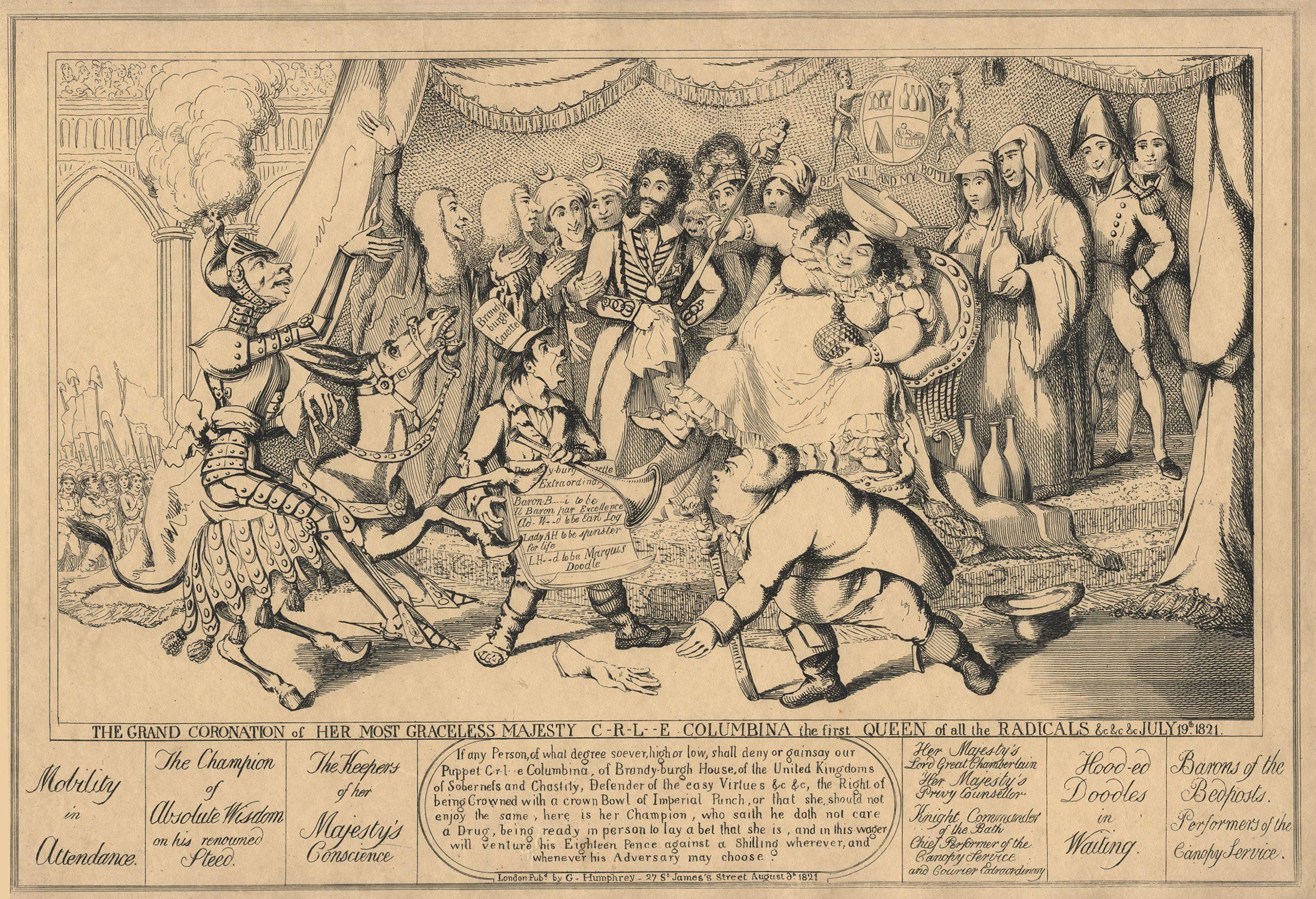
Satirical print from 1821 showing supporters of Queen Caroline: Henry Hood is the figure on the extreme right

In 1805 Hood's father-in-law died, and in 1806 his mother died, passing on her barony to him. Hood moved away from Catherington House, where he had spent much of his time, while making a deal that secured him the freehold of most of the land there. His father the 1st Viscount brought in Sir John Soane to do work on Whitley Abbey, in 1810. Catherington House was rented to tenants from 1807, and was sold in 1823 to Henry Morgan.

By 1820, when Henry was 2nd Viscount Hood, Whitley Abbey was described as his seat. He received a state pension first granted to his father.

=== Supporter of Caroline of Brunswick ===
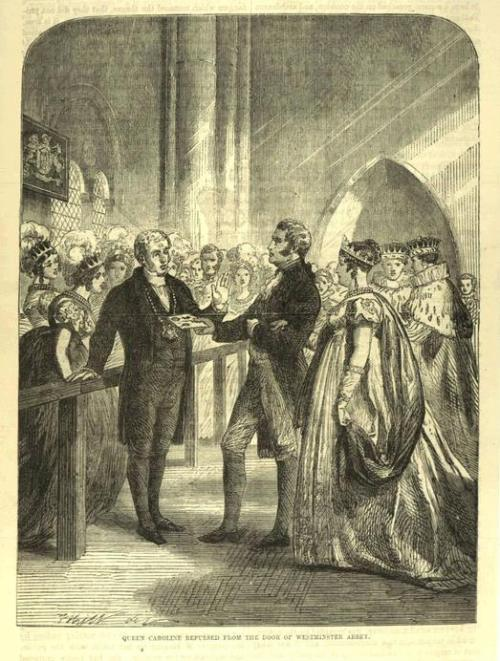
Queen Caroline Repulsed from the Door of Westminster Abbey, engraving from the Illustrated History of England (1865), vol. VII, with the Queen holding Lord Hood's arm

Princess Caroline left the United Kingdom for Italy in 1813, returning after the accession of George IV in January 1820, as Queen Caroline. Lord Hood took charge of her household, as Chamberlain, during 1820.

Hood also accompanied the Queen, during her vain attempt to gain admission to the coronation of George IV in 1821. After some attempts at other entrances, when Hood spoke for the Queen, the Queen's party, with Hood and Lady Anne Hamilton, was headed off by Robert Harry Inglis, Gold Staff Officer to the Coronation. He arrived hurriedly through Old Palace Yard, as they attempted to gain access to Westminster Abbey by an entrance adjacent to Poet's Corner. Inglis had speech with the Queen, the outcome of which was that Inglis called for her carriage to be brought up.

== Family ==
Hood married in 1774 Jane Wheler (died 1847 at age 93), the daughter of Francis Wheler (1719–1805) of Whitley Abbey, who was a grandson of the naval officer Francis Wheler (1656–1694). They had six daughters and two sons, including:

- Susanna (born 1779), married in 1797 the Rev. Richard George Richards (died 1841).
- Francis Wheler Hood (1781–1814), married in 1804 Caroline Hamond, daughter of Sir Andrew Hamond, 1st Baronet; of the 3rd Foot Guards. He died during the campaign in south-west France (1814), falling on 2 March at Aire-sur-l'Adour with the rank of lieutenant-colonel. A monument by Francis Chantrey was placed in Coventry Cathedral, where it was destroyed in 1940 during the Coventry Blitz. His son became the third Viscount in 1836; adopting also the surname of his father-in-law Richard Tibbits, he was known as Samuel Hood-Tibbits, 3rd Viscount Hood.
- Selina (born 1782), married in 1805 Vice-Admiral Sir Francis Mason.
- Samuel Hood, 2nd Baron Bridport (1788–1868).

== Notes ==
Peerage of Great Britain
Preceded by Samuel Hood	Viscount Hood; 1816–1836	Succeeded by Samuel Hood-Tibbits
Preceded by Susannah Hood	Baron Hood; 1806–1836	Succeeded by Samuel Hood-Tibbits
Peerage of Ireland
Preceded by Samuel Hood	Baron Hood; 1816–1836	Succeeded by Samuel Hood-Tibbits
Baronetage of Great Britain
Preceded by Samuel Hood	Baronet of Catherington; 1816–1836	Succeeded by Samuel Hood-Tibbits
