= Hester Lisle =

English noblewoman and courtier

Hester Lisle née Cholmondeley (1755–1828) was an English noblewoman and courtier. She is noted for her role as lady in waiting to Caroline of Brunswick, and the evidence she gave in 1806 on the affairs with men involving the Princess, married to George, Prince of Wales (later the Prince Regent).

== Background ==
She was the daughter of George Cholmondeley, Viscount Malpas, born at Burhill, near Hersham, Surrey; her father's viscountcy was a courtesy title, and she was often given the derived courtesy title the Honourable, after her marriage being styled the Hon. Mrs Lisle. Her mother Hester Edwardes was the daughter of Sir Francis Edwardes, 4th Baronet, and his wife Hester Lacon, daughter of John Lacon of West Coppice, Buildwas.

Hester Lisle, presumed by that time a widow (see below), was presented at court on 20 March 1794, with her daughter Marcia. She became a bedchamber woman to Caroline of Brunswick on the latter's arrival in England.

== Household of the Princess of Wales ==
According to Alice Greenwood, in the early days of her marriage Princess Caroline replaced Mrs. Pelham among her bedchamber women, for "sufficiently good reasons", by Hester Lisle, known in service as Mrs. Lisle. Account books show Mrs. Lisle listed in the household as a bedchamber woman, from 1795 to 1809. In 1797 her brother George Cholmondeley, 4th Earl of Cholmondeley was Chamberlain of the household, and his wife the Countess of Cholmondeley was a Lady of the Bedchamber. From her 1806 deposition, Lisle attended (by 1802) the Princess three months a year. It appears from the diary of Lord Glenbervie that there was later (independent of formal job titles) a rota, in which the Lady of the Bedchamber role of Elizabeth Herbert, Countess of Carnarvon was nominal, and Lisle took monthly turns with Lady Glenbervie, Lady Charlotte Lindsay, and Lady Charlotte Campbell.

In 1805 Hester Lisle wrote to her daughter Marcia from a house at Catherington, explaining how the Princess had been driven 62 miles (100 km) in her carriage to get there in under seven hours. They were attended by Henry Hood who lived locally. Hood at some point was Caroline's lover; and when she became Queen acted as her Chamberlain.

After attending a dinner given by the Princess in Kensington in 1809, Mary Berry wrote "Mrs. Lisle a sad aid to the Princess in entertaining her company, not having a word to throw at a dog". In an 1810 letter to Lady Charlotte Bury, the Princess described her as "my lay sister, Mrs. Lisle, who has taken her resemblance from the springing skeleton." Lisle resigned from the Princess's service in mid-1812. Matthew Gregory Lewis wrote to Charles Kirkpatrick Sharpe in August of that year, of the replacement of "poor shivering Mrs. Lisle" by Lady Anne Hamilton.

== Mrs Lisle's evidence in the "Delicate Investigation" ==
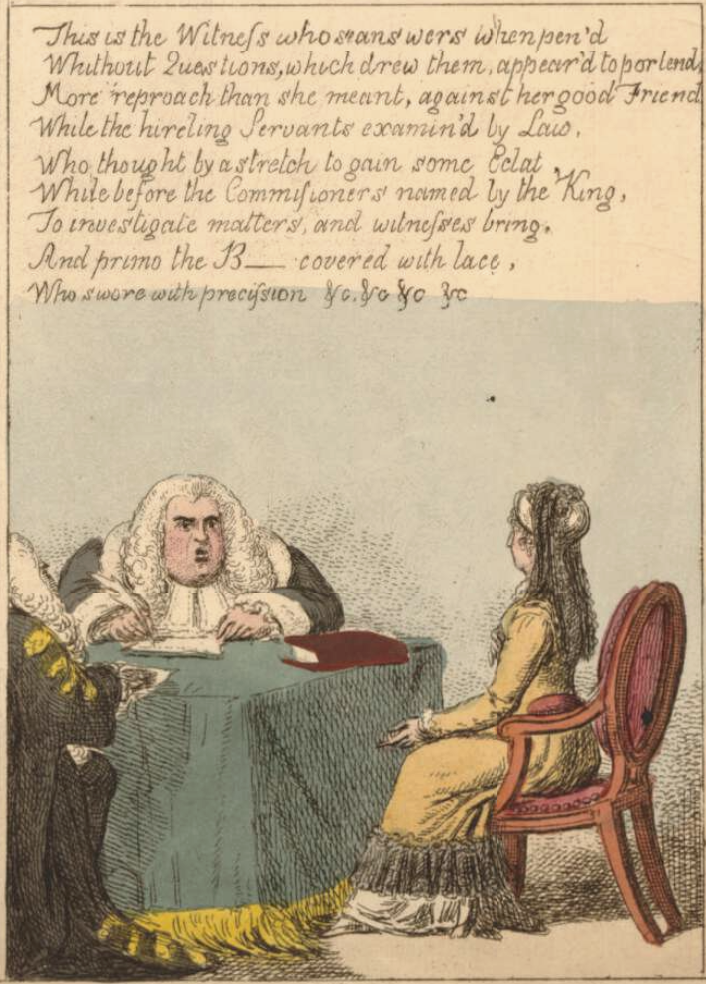
Detail from an 1813 satirical print, showing Hester Lisle's 1806 appearance before the commission investigating the conduct of the Princess of Wales

Hester Lisle was a witness in the 1806 enquiry into Princess Caroline's conduct: the "Delicate Investigation". At the time the proceedings were held in private; a version of her deposition of 3 July was published about seven years later. On the allegation, made by Lady Charlotte Douglas, wife of Sir John Douglas, that the Princess of Wales had been pregnant in 1802, and had been delivered of a child, she stated that she had been in attendance on the Princess in August 1802, and had seen no signs of pregnancy.

Interpretation of Lisle's other evidence, with its equivocal reporting of Caroline's flirting, did not make it easy to condemn or to exonerate the Princess. Her testimony of improper conduct by the Princess towards Thomas Manby amounted to disapproval, rather than support for a charge of adultery, which in law would have been high treason. Spencer Perceval, attorney-general in the second Pitt ministry, in a report published later after his death in 1812, wrote on behalf of the Princess:

What Mrs. Lisle exactly means by only flirting conduct—what degree of impropriety of conduct she would describe by it, it is extremely difficult, with any precision, to ascertain.

On the Princess's relationship with Henry Hood, Lisle testified that the Princess and Hood, with Hood's servant only in attendance, had taken long drives together at Catherington in Hood's whisky.

=== Aftermath ===
Samuel Whitbread re-opened the matter in 1813, stating that the commissioners in the enquiry had suppressed some of the evidence given by Lisle. This claim was strongly rebutted, and Henry Brougham who was leading the Whig agitation, against the Prince Regent and supporting the Princess's effort for better treatment, was vexed by the development. Whitbread had in fact received a letter from Lisle, at Canbury, about her contemporary notes on the questions and answers at the hearing.

In 1813 the Antigallican Monitor picked up on the 1806 death of Lisle's daughter, commenting that it could account for the "serious and even severe turn" in her thinking as a witness. The Monitor was subsidised by Tory party funds, through Lisle's son-in-law Charles Arbuthnot. The matter continued to be discussed in the same terms, for example by Erskine Neale in 1829, echoed by Robert Macoy.

== Death and legacy ==
Hester Lisle died on 26 November 1828 at Kingston upon Thames, aged 73. Her funeral took place at St Mary's Parish Church, Hampton on 2 December. There is a monumental inscription in the church to Lisle and her maternal grandmother Lady Edwards—Hester Edward(e)s née Lacon (died 1805), wife of Sir Francis Edwardes, 4th Baronet—by Robert Blore; it gives her place of death as Canbury.

Harriet Arbuthnot commented on Hester Lisle's will "Mr. Arbuthnot succeeds by right to her landed property, & her money she has left among her grandchildren. They will be very well off for she has left above £36,000." Lisle's estate at Winterbourne Abbas was purchased in 1829 by Robert Williams (1767–1847).

=== George Brooks Forster ===
The will also remembered George Brooks Forster RN, commander of the brig HMS Emu, and his sister Sarah Forster. They were children of Mary Forster née Brooks, estranged wife of John Forster (died 1840) of Egham House, Surrey and a slave-holder in Jamaica, with Ebenezer Mussell. Hester had befriended Mary in 1787, inviting her to stay with the Lisle family in Lille. Mary died in 1809; Hester kept in touch with her mother Deborah Brooks, and supported George. Lachlan Macquarie recommended Brooks to the Colonial Secretary, with the patronage of Charles Arbuthnot, in March 1816. Macquarie sent Brooks and the Emu, "declared unfit for colonial service", back to the United Kingdom from New South Wales that month, with a cargo of emus and black swans.

George Brooks Forster's daughter Maria Lisle Forster married Robert Tooth in 1849.

== Family ==
Hester Cholmondeley married in 1773 William Clapcott Lisle; the couple eloped, and the wedding took place on 7 September in St Martin, Jersey. Her husband was the son of Warren Lisle, who in that year gave up his post as customs officer at Weymouth, Dorset to William; his mother was Ruth Clapcott, Warren's second wife. A source states that William died before 1790. He was alive at the time of the Lisle family's residence in Lille, mentioned above, in the late 1780s. His father died in 1788, the death recorded as being in July. A newspaper notice in June of that year announced a meeting in Puddletown for creditors of William Clapcot Lisle, of Holyport.

Their children included Marcia Mary Anne (1775–1806), who married Charles Arbuthnot as his first wife in 1799, and Emma Horatia (1777–1797). Horace Walpole, Hester's great-uncle, mentioned them in a 1794 letter, as travelling abroad with their mother and her brother the Earl of Cholmondeley. The memorial inscription to Emma from Hampton church mentions that Hester was by then widowed.
