= Coronation portrait of George IV =

1821 painting by Thomas Lawrence

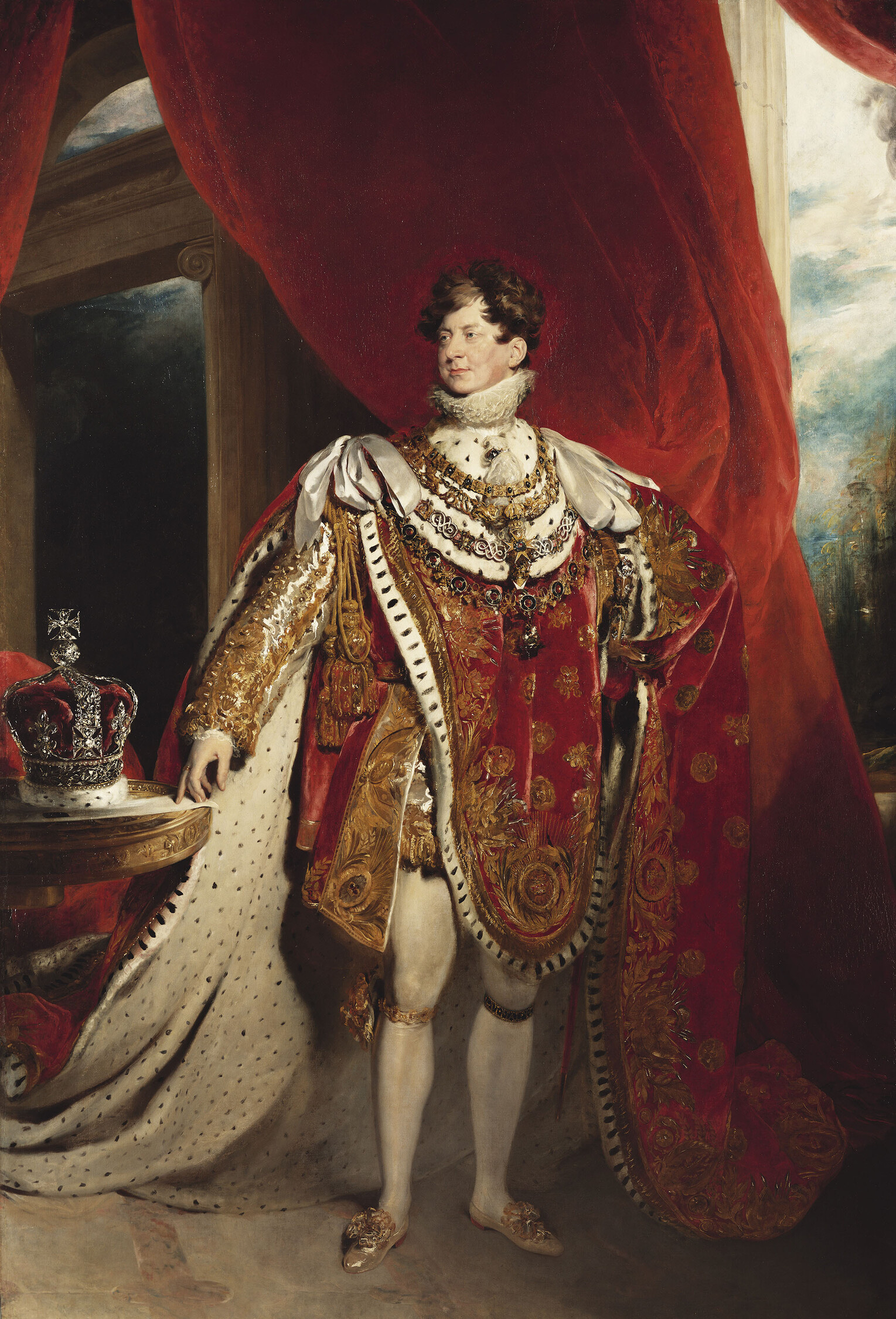
- Artist: Thomas Lawrence
- Year: 1821
- Type: Oil on canvas, portrait painting
- Dimensions: 295.4 cm × 205.4 cm (116.3 in × 80.9 in)
- Location: Royal Collection, London

George IV is an 1821 portrait painting by the English artist Thomas Lawrence portraying George IV, the reigning monarch of the United Kingdom.

== History ==
George is depicted in the robes he wore for his coronation in July 1821. Lawrence was Britain's pre-eminent portrait painter and had previously depicted George on a number of occasions during the Regency era before he came to the throne in succession to his father George III in 1820. Lawrence had been elected President of the Royal Academy in 1820 following the death of Benjamin West.

The painting was displayed at the Royal Academy Exhibition of 1822 at Somerset House. George had designed the coronation robes himself, and commissioned the painting from Lawrence for the throne room where it still hangs today as part of the Royal Collection. The following year he posed for a more informal painting by Lawrence which is now part of the Wallace Collection.

== See also ==
- Portrait of Caroline, Princess of Wales and Princess Charlotte, 1801 work featuring George's wife and daughter
- Portrait of Caroline of Brunswick, 1804 work featuring George's now estranged wife Caroline
- Portrait of Charles X, 1825 portrait of the French king commissioned by George following the French monarch's coronation that year

== Bibliography ==
- Hall, Michael. Art, Passion & Power: The Story of the Royal Collection. ISBN 1473530954. Random House, 2017.
- Levey, Michael. Sir Thomas Lawrence. ISBN 0300109989. Yale University Press, 2005.
