= Warren Lisle =

British Member of Parliament (died 1788)

Warren Lisle (c.1695–July 1788) was an English customs officer, active against smugglers. He was mayor of Lyme Regis in 1751, 1754 and 1763, and, near the end of his life, Member of Parliament for Weymouth and Melcombe Regis.

== Life ==
He was son of Warren Lisle the elder, searcher of the customs at Weymouth, Dorset. His family was related to the Tuckers, the local Members of Parliament Edward Tucker and John Tucker, and so was connected to Gabriel Steward who married a granddaughter of Edward Tucker.

Lisle took up the same customs position as his father had held, in 1721. From about 1737 he was operating against smugglers in the English Channel with two vessels, from Hengistbury Head. Around 1740 the Commissioners of Customs made Lisle Surveyor of Sloops, for the south coast. By 1747 he was commander of the Cholmondeley sloop, a revenue cutter of 80 tons which he also owned. In July of that year, he took in it two sloops off Bigbury-on-Sea on Devon, with cargoes of tea, brandy, rum and tobacco.

For a period of nearly 40 years, Lisle controlled the coastal revenue vessels, from Portsmouth in the east to Land's End in the west. In 1761, during the Seven Years' War, Lisle in the Cholmondeley (given as Cholmondely) took the French privateer Triumphant from Cherbourg), west of Portland Bill. The cutter was purchased as a 15-year old vessel by the Royal Navy in 1763 and refitted, becoming HMS Cholmondely, commissioned under Skeffington Lutwidge. In 1764 Lisle reported that smuggling was as active as he had known it.

When Lisle resigned his post at Weymouth in 1773, it passed to his son William. He left the customs service finally in 1779, then writing a series of reports to Lord Shelburne, the Home Secretary.

Lisle was elected on 7 September 1780 during that year's general election as MP for Weymouth and Melcombe Regis as locum tenens, aged reportedly 85. He stood down on 21 November to allow his kinsman, Gabriel Steward, to stand for the seat after completing his own term as mayor of the borough (when he had been the local returning officer).

Warren Lisle died in July 1788 at Upwey, Dorset, aged 93.

== Family ==
Lisle married, secondly, Ruth Clapcott. She was an heiress, one of two daughters of Henry Clapcott of Winterbourne Abbas (died 1716). Their children included:

- Radigan, married Edward Tucker, son of Richard Tucker of Weymouth
- Anne (died 1774) who married Augustus Floyer. She was a musical friend of James Harris of Winchester.
- William Clapcott Lisle (baptised 1748, died before 1790), who married in 1773 Hester Cholmondeley, sister of George Cholmondeley, 4th Earl of Cholmondeley; and was father of Marcia Arbuthnot. Hester died in 1828, leaving (according to Harriet Arbuthnot's journal) £36,000 in cash for her grandchildren, as well as landed property which went to the Arbuthnots.

Ruth Lisle left a will of 1790, in which daughters of Warren Lisle's first marriage may be identified: Penelope Nicholls then a widow, Patty Stoford called Patty Stevens in Warren Lisle's will, Betsey wife of Francis Tueksbury. A son Davie in Warren Lisle's will was then in Barbados. John Nicoll, controller of customs at Newport, Rhode Island, married Penelope Lisle, daughter of Warren Lisle. Nicoll, a Loyalist of the American Revolutionary War, left Newport in 1779. John served for some years in the Royal Navy. His son Warren Lisle Nicoll commanded the American Loyalist privateers Hammond in 1779 and Nicoll (14 guns, 50 men) during the American Revolutionary War, the latter being sent for refitting in early 1780. He subsequently served in the Royal Navy as an acting lieutenant under the Board of Ordnance of the British government, and in 1782 obtained command of the frigate Calonne. During the Great Siege of Gibraltar, he attempted to supply the besieged with mortar bombs and powder aboard Calonne, taking part in the action of 6 September 1782.
