= Emu (1813 ship) =

History

United Kingdom
- Name: Emu
- Namesake: Emu
- Operator: Transport Board
- Launched: 1813, Dartmouth
- Fate: Wrecked 1817

General characteristics
- Class & type: Brig
- Tons burthen: 182, or 188 (bm)
- Propulsion: Sail
- Armament: 14 × 18-pounder carronades

Emu (sometimes "His Majesty's armed brig Emu", was a merchant ship built at Dartmouth in 1813. The British government engaged her to go out to New South Wales to serve the colony there. She spent about a year transporting people and supplies between New South Wales and Van Diemen's Land before the colonial government sent her back to England in 1816. On her way she stopped at the Cape Colony where she was wrecked in 1817.

== Career ==
Governor Lachlan Macquarie requested on 30 April 1810 that the British Government supply the colony with two brigs for the colony's use that would not be subject to the control of the Admiralty. The British government provided Emu and Kangaroo. Emu never arrived as an American privateer had captured her as Emu was on her way to Port Jackson. The British government therefore provided a second Emu.

Emu was launched at Dartmouth in 1813. She entered the Register of Shipping (RS) in the 1815 volume as a brig built in Dartmouth in 1813. Her master was A. Tracey, her operator was the Transport Board, and her trade was London–Botany Bay.

On 8 July 1814 Emu was at Deal, awaiting to sail to New South Wales. The Navy appointed Lieutenant George Brooks Forster to command Emu and she departed from England on 1 September 1814. She sailed via Madeira and Rio de Janeiro, where she stayed for some three weeks. She sailed for Port Jackson on 28 November 1814 and arrived at Hobart Town on 12 February 1815. She arrived at Port Jackson on 12 March.

On 19 July Emu sailed for the River Derwent (Tasmania). She returned to Port Jackson on 30 August with wheat. She sailed again for Hobart Town on 19 September. She returned on 14 October with troops. She then sailed on 1 November for Port Dalrymple. She returned to Port Jackson on 24 February 1816.

Governor Macquarie after assessment in Sydney that Emu was unseaworthy and should be withdrawn from naval and colonial service. She left Port Jackson on 25 March, and Hobart Town on 15 April.

On her way to England Emu encountered a hurricane off the coast of southern Africa near Cape Agulhas. She sustained some damage to a topmast and put into Simon's Bay where she struck a rock. She was refloated the following day and hove down for repairs. She arrived at the Cape of Good Hope prior to 11 August. At the Cape Emu was found to be seaworthy and the authorities detained to use her for local errands.

== Fate ==
On 11 February 1817, Emu was wrecked on a submerged rock at Knysna, east of Simon's Bay. One report stated that "HM brig Emu", a transport belonging to the Cape Town Dockyard, was the first European vessel to enter the Knysna heads. She struck a rock, now known as Emu Rock, and was holed. Her crew ran Emu ashore to prevent her sinking. In late April HMS Podargus arrived to render assistance. After surveying the area, Podargus sailed into the Knysna and retrieved Emu's cargo.

Lloyd's List reported on 29 July 1817 that the "Emu, Colonial Brig," had wrecked on the south-west coast of Africa, but that her crew had been saved.
