= Ranger's House =

Georgian mansion next to Greenwich Park

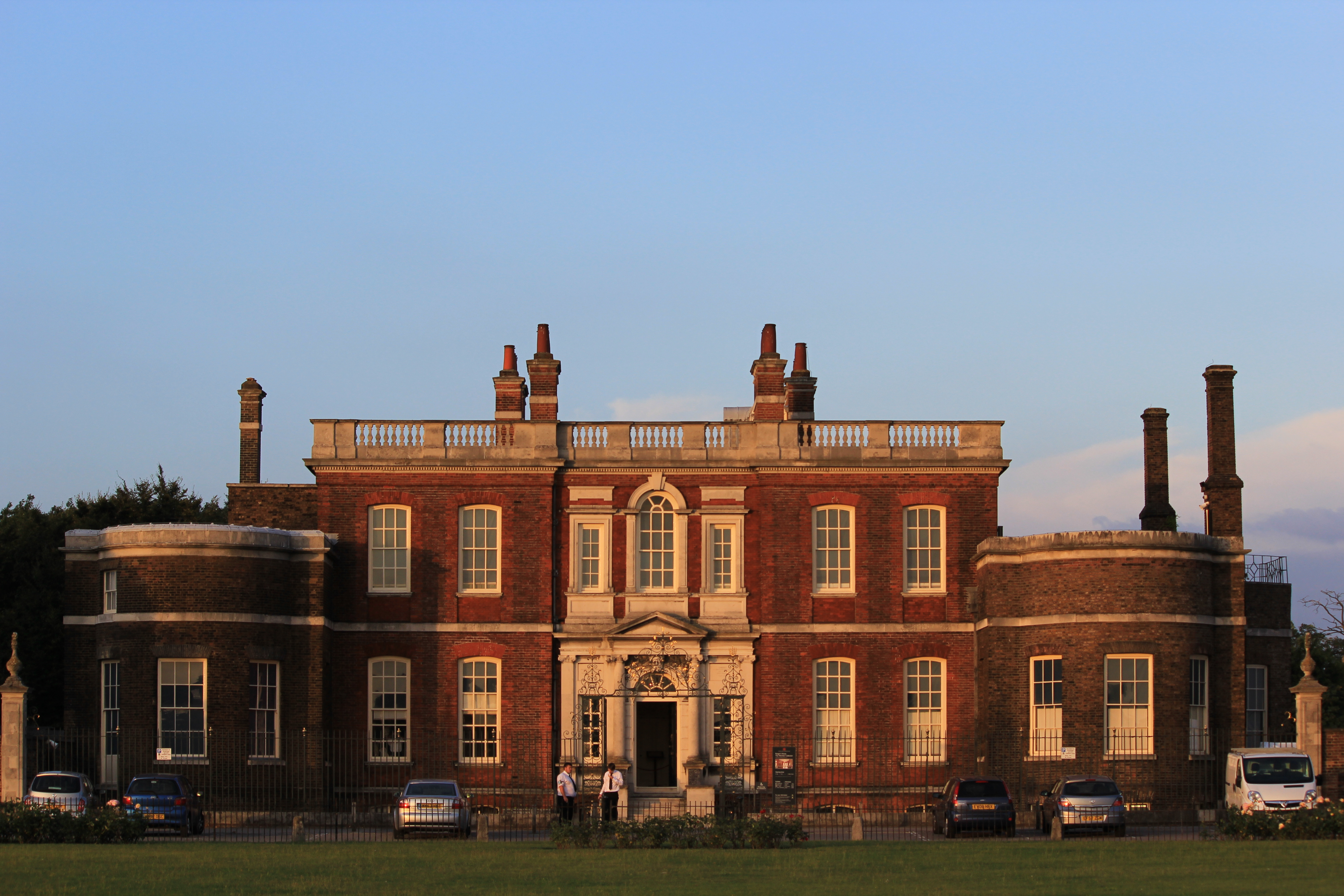
- Ranger's House, seen from Shooters Hill Road

- Location within Royal Borough of Greenwich
- 51°28′24.4″N 00°00′5.8″W
- Type: Mansion
- Location: Blackheath
- OS grid reference: TQ 38887 76832

History
- Built: c. 1722

Site notes
- Area: Greater London
- Architect: John James
- Architectural style: Palladian
- Owner: English Heritage

Listed Building – Grade I
- Official name: The Ranger's House
- Designated: 19 October 1951
- Reference no.: 1218679

Ranger's House is a medium-sized red brick Georgian mansion in the Palladian style, adjacent to Greenwich Park in the south east of London. It is situated in Blackheath and backs directly onto Greenwich Park. Previously known as Chesterfield House, its current name is associated with the Ranger of Greenwich Park, a royal appointment; the house was the Ranger's official residence for most of the 19th century. It is a Grade I listed building. There is a rose garden behind it, and since 2002 it has housed the Wernher Collection of art.

== History ==
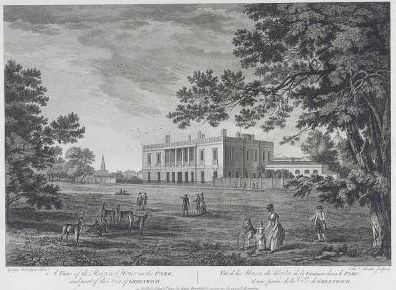
The Ranger's House, Greenwich by George Robertson, 1791. Built about 1722–23 for Captain Francis Hosier. National Maritime Museum, London. (PT2659)

The house, probably dating from 1722 to 1723, was originally built for Capt., later Vice-Admiral, Francis Hosier (1673–1727) on wasteland adjacent to Greenwich Park, probably with John James as architect. The house then had a superb view and easy access to London by road and river. Hosier had made his fortune through trade at sea and both the ship he served on as a lieutenant and his own ship were called the Neptune. He occupied the house until dying of yellow fever at sea in 1727, during the disastrous Blockade of Porto Bello off Panama.

In 1748 the lease of the house was inherited by the 4th Earl of Chesterfield. He was a politician, diplomat, man of letters and wit who eventually became Secretary of State. He added the splendid bow windowed gallery for entertaining and displaying his art treasures. Chesterfield wrote that the view from the gallery gave him "three different, and the finest, prospects in the world".

In 1782, the next purchaser was Richard Hulse (1727–1805), 2nd son of Sir Edward Hulse, 1st Bt., physician to George II and Elizabeth Levett. He was High Sheriff of Kent in 1768 and a JP. He held the office of Deputy Governor of the Hudson's Bay Company between 1799 and 1805. He lived at sometime at Baldwins, Kent, and died unmarried without progeny. Hulse added a room with a bow window on the north side to balance Chesterfield's gallery and this is how the house appears today.

Chesterfield House, as it was known, was briefly renamed Brunswick house while occupied by the Duchess of Brunswick from 1807 to 1813.

It was first used as the official residence of the Ranger of Greenwich Park in 1816; previously, Caroline of Brunswick, appointed Ranger in 1806, had lived in the neighbouring Montagu House (demolished in 1815).

At the invitation of Queen Victoria, Field Marshal Lord Wolseley and his family moved from their former home at 6 Hill Street, London to the much grander Ranger's House in Autumn 1888.

The London County Council purchased the house in 1902 from the Commissioners of Woods and Forests and it became a council sports club and tea rooms. It was requisitioned in both World Wars. Two blue plaques were erected by the London County Council in 1937 to commemorate Wolseley and Chesterfield at the house. Later it was used to display the Dolmetsch collection of musical instruments and the Suffolk Collection of Jacobean portraits. The latter is now on display at Kenwood House.

In 1986 Ranger's House came into the care of English Heritage.

=== Ranger of Greenwich Park ===
The first Ranger was appointed in 1690. A royal appointment, it is a sinecure carrying no official responsibilities, and was for some years combined with the office of Governor of the Greenwich Hospital. At first, the Ranger resided at the Queen's House, Greenwich. Past Rangers have included:

- Charles Sackville, 6th Earl of Dorset (appointed 1690)
- Henry Sydney, 1st Earl of Romney (1697 – ?)
- Sir William Gifford (1710 – ?)
- Matthew Aylmer, 1st Baron Aylmer (1714–1720)
- Sir John Jennings (1720–1743)
- Lady Catherine Pelham (wife of Henry Pelham; 1743–1780)
- Caroline of Brunswick (1805–1813)
- Princess Sophia Mathilda of Gloucester (1813 – 1844)
- Garnet Wolseley, 1st Viscount Wolseley (1888–1896)

== Wernher Collection ==
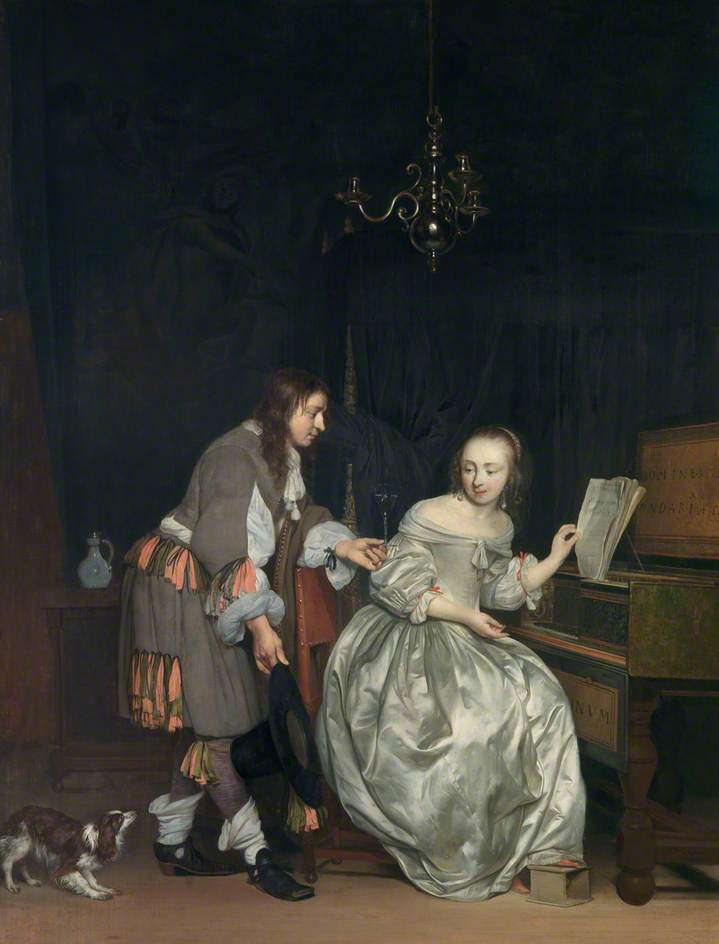
Gabriël Metsu - The Spinet

The Wernher Collection was assembled by the German-born diamond magnate Sir Julius Wernher in the late 19th and early 20th centuries. Wernher lived at Bath House on Piccadilly and Luton Hoo in Bedfordshire. At one time part of the collection was on display to the public at Luton Hoo, which was owned by Sir Julius' descendants until the early years of the 21st century. There are about 700 items on display at Ranger's House occupying twelve rooms, some of which have been decorated to evoke the way the collection was displayed when it was at Bath House.

The collection includes a painting from the workshop of Sandro Botticelli (“Madonna of the Pomegranate”), works by Filippino Lippi, Hans Memling, Pieter de Hooch, Gabriël Metsu, Francesco Francia, and portraits by the English painters Sir Joshua Reynolds, George Romney and John Hoppner.

The collection also contains an eclectic mix of decorative art with many pieces by acknowledged masters, including Renaissance jewellery, medieval, Byzantine and Renaissance ivories, enamels, bronzes, Italian maiolica, tapestries, furniture and Sèvres porcelain, as well as a life size marble sculpture by Bergonzoli of an angel kissing a semi-nude woman entitled "The Love of Angels".

== In popular culture ==
The exterior of the house appears as the home of the fictional Bridgerton family in the Netflix series Bridgerton.
