= Giulio Bergonzoli =

Italian sculptor

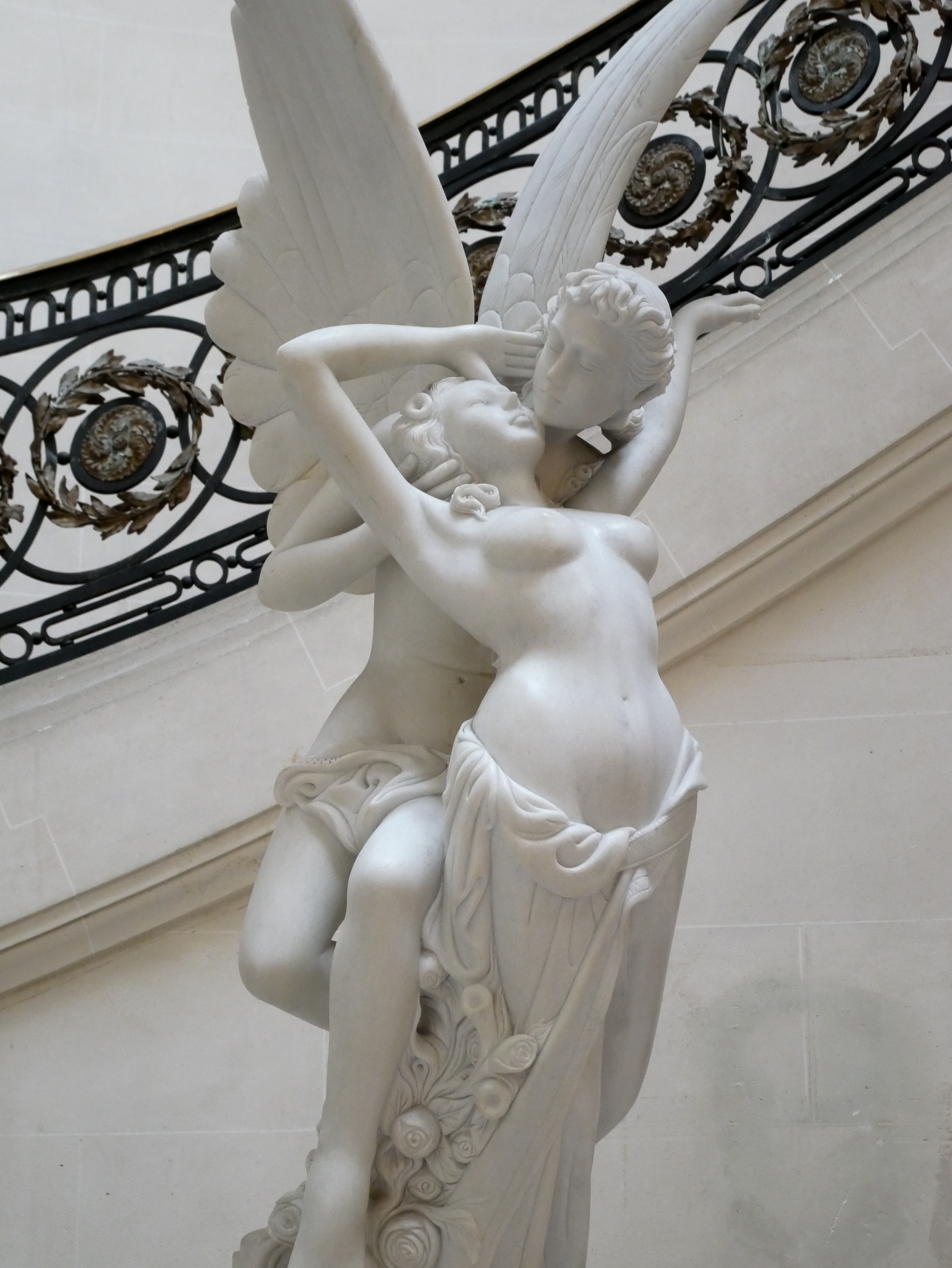
Bergonzoli's "The Love of Angels" inside Luton Hoo in Bedfordshire, England

Giulio Bergonzoli was a late nineteenth-century Italian sculptor. He belonged to the Modern Italian school of sculptors from Milan.

His works include the marble sculpture "The Love Of Angels" (L'Amore degli Angeli), now on display at the Ranger's house, Greenwich, London as part of the Wernher collection.
