= Action of 6 September 1782 =

Naval battle of the American Revolutionary War

- Part of the Anglo-Spanish War (1779–1783)
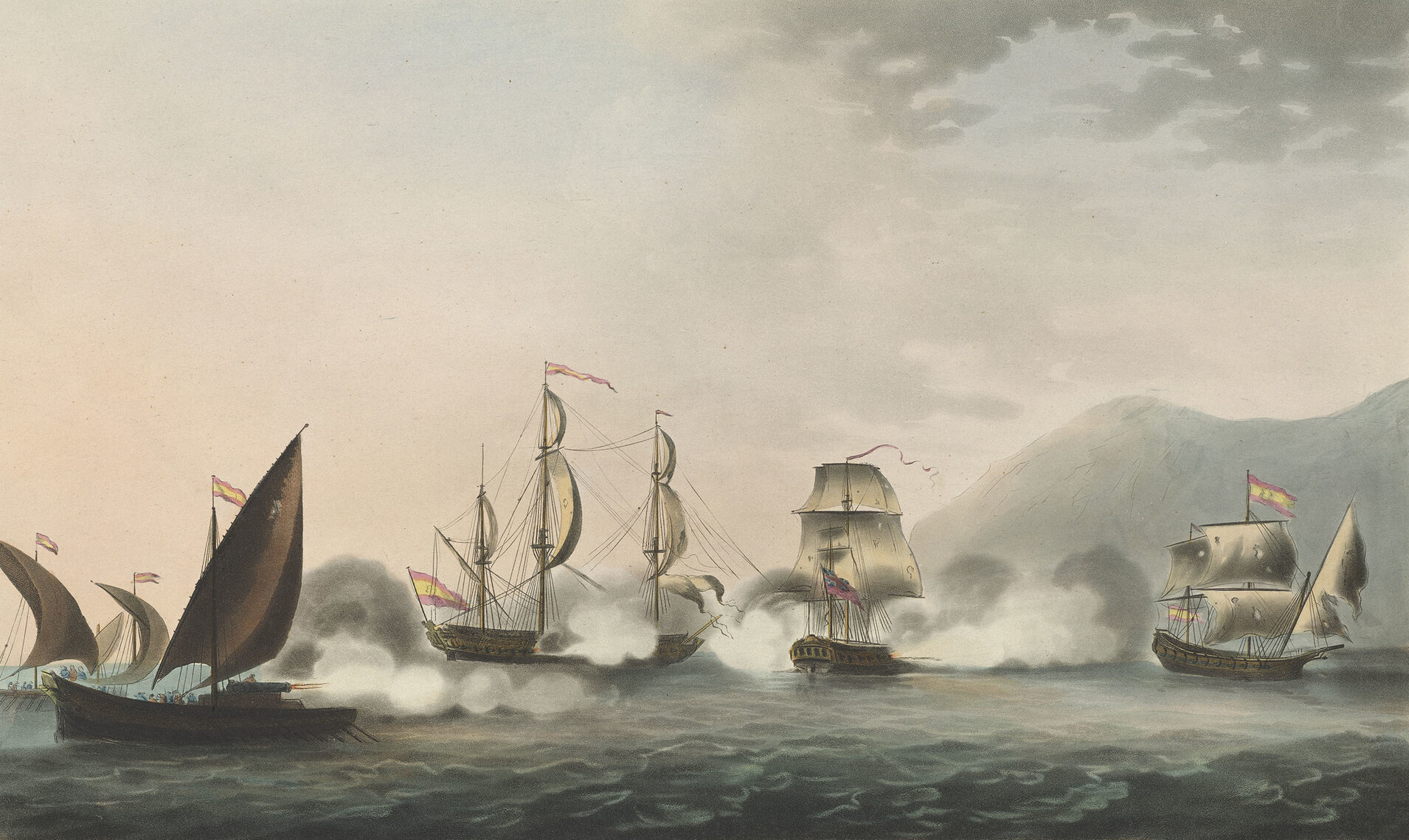
- An ordnance Store Ship of 18 guns Commanded by Lieut. Heighington R.N. breaking the blockade of Gibraltar in 1782
Date	6 September 1782
Location	Off Cape Spartel, Atlantic Ocean
Result	Spanish victory

Belligerents
Spain	Great Britain

Commanders and leaders
Pedro Winthuysen Pineda	(Kingdom of Great Britain) Warren Nicoll (surrendered)

Strength
1 frigate of 34 guns 2 cutters	1 frigate of 26 guns

Casualties and losses
None	200 prisoners 1 frigate captured

The action of 6 September 1782 was a naval engagement during the American Revolutionary War and formed part of the Anglo-Spanish War (1779–1783). In this action, a Spanish flotilla captured the 26-gun frigate Calonne, a British 400-ton armed storeship belonging to the Board of Ordnance, which had been tasked with supplying the garrison of Gibraltar with military stores.

== Battle ==
After receiving orders to reinforce Gibraltar, Calonne—formerly a French 34-gun privateer frigate captured by the Royal Navy in 1781—was loaded with 3,000 mortar bombs, gunpowder, and clothing intended for the garrison. Commanded by Acting Lieutenant Warren Lisle Nicoll of the Royal Navy, who served as superintendent of the vessel on behalf of the British Board of Ordnance, she departed England in June 1782 and initially put in at Lisbon. Although a neutral port, Lisbon functioned as an important logistical base for vessels of the Board of Ordnance. From there, Calonne conducted a series of cruises in an attempt to enter the Strait; however, the presence of blockading forces—frequently sighted by Nicoll—made this objective difficult and ultimately prevented him from completing his mission.

During these operations, Calonne captured several prizes. On 23 June, she seized a Jesuit barque as well as the copper-sheathed French privateer Aimable Adelaide. A month later, on 23 July, she took two merchant vessels off Cape Spartel, both of which were sent to Faro in Portugal under prize crews. Further captures followed in August, including the polacre Laborieux, taken on 11 August some distance from Cádiz, and the Boreas, which were likewise dispatched to Lisbon.

Nicoll eventually made an attempt to reach Gibraltar when conditions appeared favourable. However, on 6 September 1782 his ship was detected to the west of the Strait by Spanish blockading forces, which immediately gave chase. The 14-gun cutter Bizarra was the first to engage, inflicting damage to Calonne's rigging and sails. By evening, the cutter Primera Resolución had also come up and maintained contact for over an hour, until reinforced by the brig Caulican and the 34-gun, copper-sheathed frigate Nuestra Señora del Carmen, under Capitán de Fragata Pedro Winthuysen y Pineda.

At the time of the engagement, H.M. Ordnance Storeship Calonne was armed with twenty-two 6-pounder guns and four 4-pounders, and carried a complement of around 200 men, including both crew and troops intended to reinforce Gibraltar. Confronted by overwhelming opposition, Nicoll was compelled to surrender.

== Aftermath ==
Following her capture, Calonne was taken by a prize crew into Cádiz, escorted by Caulican. She was subsequently incorporated into the Spanish Navy as a sixth-rate frigate and, renamed Colón, went on to have a successful career in Spanish service before being broken up in 1806.
