= Caroline, Princess of Wales and Princess Charlotte =

1801 painting by Thomas Lawrence

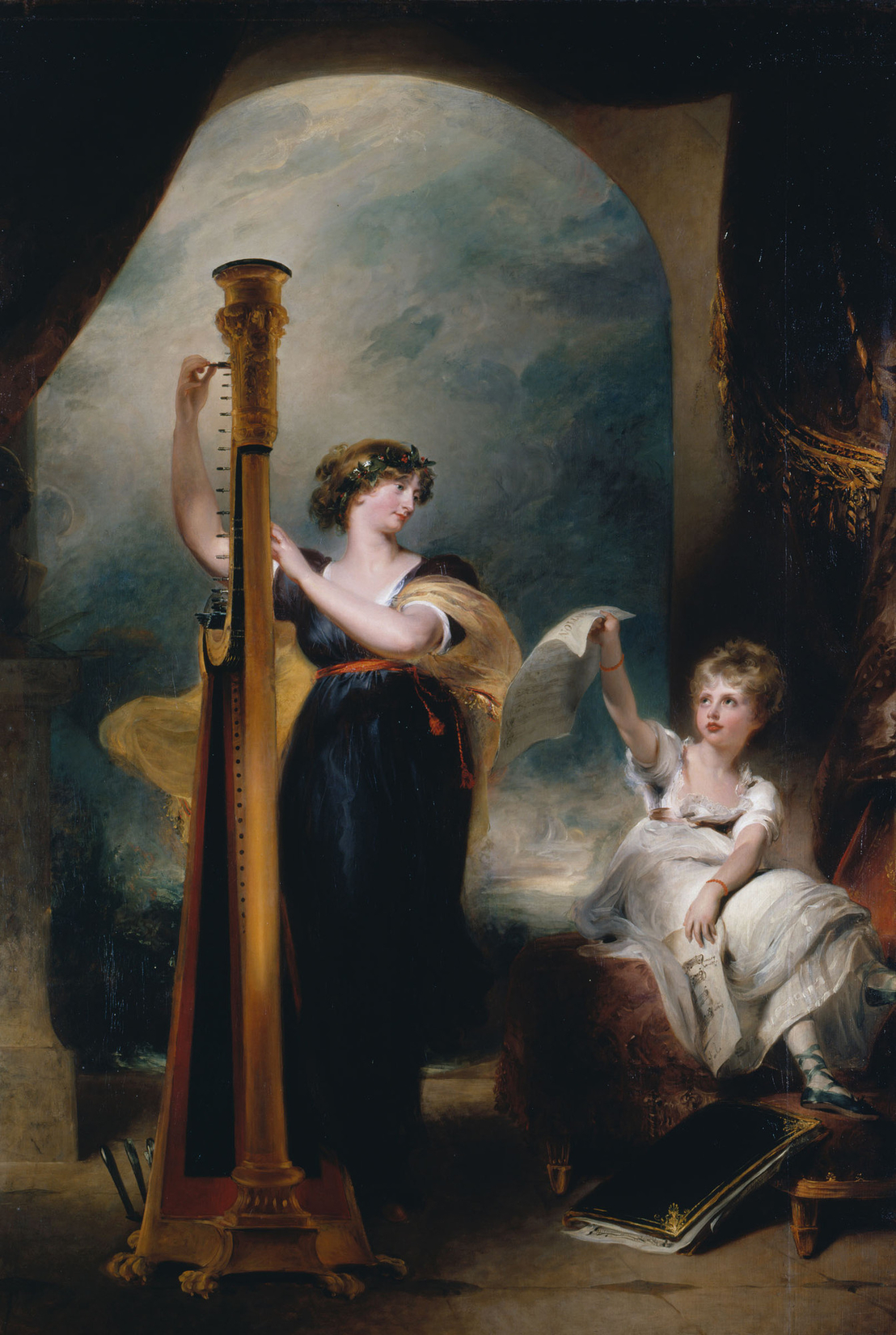
- Artist: Thomas Lawrence
- Year: 1801
- Type: Oil on canvas, portrait
- Dimensions: 302.2 cm × 203.2 cm (119.0 in × 80.0 in)
- Location: Royal Collection, Buckingham Palace, London

Caroline, Princess of Wales and Princess Charlotte is an 1801 portrait by the English artist Sir Thomas Lawrence depicting Caroline, Princess of Wales and her daughter Charlotte of Wales, then second in line to the throne after her father George, Prince of Wales who was the eldest son of George III. By this stage in their marriage Caroline and her husband were estranged and effectively separated.

The painting was commissioned by Lady Townshend, Mistress of the Robes to Caroline. Caroline was taking lessons on the harp and is portrayed tuning the instrument while Charlotte holds out a sheet of music towards her mother. It was exhibited to popular acclaim at the 1802 Royal Academy summer exhibition.

The painting of the work by Lawrence later became the subject of some controversy. During the portrait's completion he had sometimes stayed overnight at Caroline's home Montagu House in Blackheath. During 1806 the delicate investigation was launched by Caroline's husband George in an effort to gain evidence to secure him a divorce. Lawrence was, along with several others figures including the politician George Canning, accused of having an affair with Caroline. Lawrence submitted an affidavit in order to clear his name. The investigation ultimately concluded that there was insufficient evidence to proceed. The painting remained in Caroline's possession until her death in 1821 and was later acquired by Queen Victoria, first cousin of Princess Charlotte.

== See also ==
- Portrait of Caroline of Brunswick, an 1804 work by Thomas Lawrence
- Portrait of George IV, 1821 work by Thomas Lawrence
- Victoria, Duchess of Kent with Princess Victoria, 1821 work by William Beechey featuring Charlotte's cousin the future Queen Victoria with her mother.

== Bibliography ==
- Ambrose, Tom. Prinny and His Pals: George IV and His Remarkable Gift of Friendship. ISBN 0720613264. Peter Owen, 2009.
- Fraser, Flora. The Unruly Queen: The Life of Queen Caroline. ISBN 0307456366. A&C Black, 2012.
- Levey, Michael. Sir Thomas Lawrence. ISBN 0300109989. Yale University Press, 2005.
- Plowden, Alison. Caroline and Charlotte: Regency Scandals. The History Press, 2011.
- Stott, Anne. The Lost Queen: The Life and Tragedy of the Prince Regent's Daughter. ISBN 1526736438. Pen and Sword History, 2020.
