= Marcia Arbuthnot =

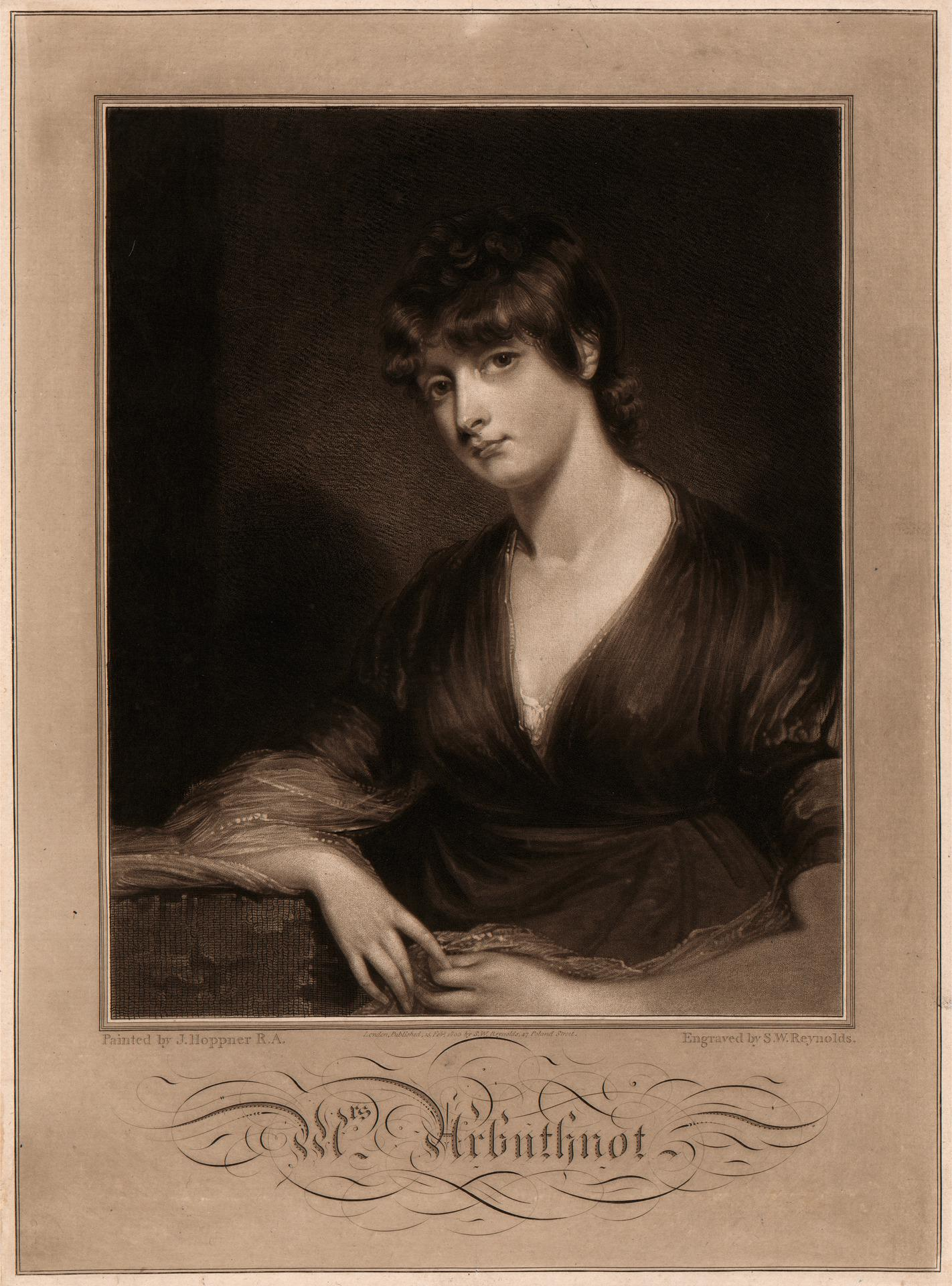
Portrait of Marcia Arbuthnot.

Marcia Arbuthnot (9 July 1774 – 24 May 1806) was the first wife of politician Charles Arbuthnot.

== Life ==
She was born Marcia Mary Anne Clapcott Lisle, the daughter of William Clapcott Lisle of Upwey, Dorset and his wife Hester Cholmondeley, the daughter of George Cholmondeley, Viscount Malpas). Her father was the son of Warren Lisle, a celebrated customs officer who engaged at sea with smugglers. William took over his post, searcher of the customs at Weymouth, Dorset, in 1773, the year in which he married Hester. He died before 1790. Marcia had a younger sister Emma Horatia (1777–1797).

Hester Lisle was presented at court on 20 March 1794, with Marcia. Horace Walpole wrote to Mary Berry of "my nieces the Lisles" dining with him on 20 September 1794. The editors of Walpole's correspondence comment on the relationship (he was a great-uncle of Hester); and that an older sister, Harriot Hester Lisle (born ?1774) was presumably dead by then, consistent with another source saying William was survived by two daughters. Hester Lisle became a Lady-in-Waiting to Caroline of Brunswick, joining her household from the time in 1795 when she married George, Prince of Wales, so becoming Princess of Wales. She died in 1828.

Lord Minto described a grand dinner at Montagu House, Blackheath in December 1798, given by the Princess, at which "Mrs. and Miss Lisle" were guests. Marcia married Arbuthnot on 28 February 1799 at Cholmondeley House, Piccadilly.

== Death ==
Marcia Arbuthnot died in Constantinople on 24 May 1806 in childbirth, "after seven years of perfect happiness", while her husband was Ambassador to the Ottoman Empire. Her mother erected a memorial plaque to Marcia in Plympton church.

Arbuthnot remarried, his second wife being Harriet Fane (1793–1834), who became a notable political hostess. Her portrait was painted by John Hoppner and an engraving of the portrait was made by Samuel Reynolds.

== Family ==
The children of Charles and Marcia Arbuthnot were:

- General Charles George James Arbuthnot
- Caroline Emma Arbuthnot
- Henry Arbuthnot
- Marcia Emma Georgiana Arbuthnot, who married William Cholmondeley, 3rd Marquess of Cholmondeley
