= James Lonsdale (painter) =

English painter

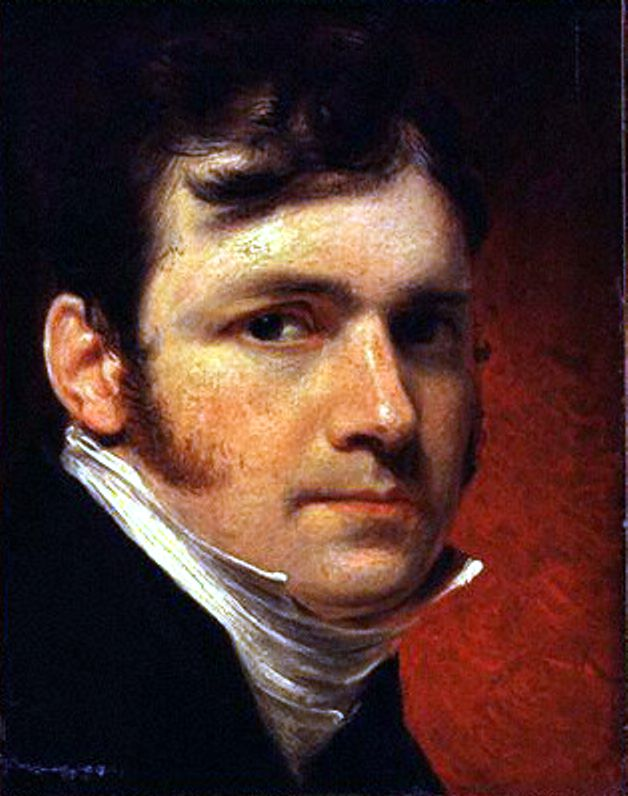
Self-portrait, c. 1810

James Lonsdale (16 May 1777, Lancaster – 17 January 1839, London) was a fashionable and prolific English portrait painter who exhibited some 138 works at the Royal Academy between 1802 and 1838, and was one of the founders of the Society of British Artists. His work was influenced and overshadowed by his more successful contemporary Sir Thomas Lawrence (1769–1830). Lonsdale was a pupil of George Romney (1734–1802).

Lonsdale, who started off as a pattern designer at Margerison and Glover's print-works in Catterall, was encouraged as an artist by the Lancaster architect Richard Threlfall, of whom he exhibited a portrait in 1809. Lord Archibald, impressed by the quality of his painting and drawing, invited him to Ashton Hall. Here he met two of Lord Archibald's daughters, Lady Anne Hamilton and Lady Susan, the Countess of Dunmore. Feeling that his future would hold more promise in the city, he moved to London, becoming a favourite pupil of Romney's, accompanying him abroad on several occasions. He enrolled in the Royal Academy Schools on 23 October 1801. Lonsdale married a Lancastrian, Miss Thornton, and set up a residence in Southgate. The marriage produced three sons who became portrait painter, the second was James John Lonsdale, recorder of Folkestone, and the last a surgeon.

Highly respected, his growing list of clients enabled him to purchase John Opie's studio at 8 Berners Street in the City of Westminster, where he remained until his death. After settling into his new studio he made the acquaintance of the Duke of Norfolk, who commissioned him to do a large historical painting of King John and Magna Carta, which later was rendered in stained glass in Arundel Castle. Besides the Duke of Norfolk, his sitters included Nicholas I of Russia, the Duke of Sussex, the Archibald Douglas-Hamilton, 9th Duke of Hamilton and the Marquess of Downshire. In 1820 the Lord Mayor of London commissioned him to do a portrait of Queen Caroline, after which he was appointed her official portrait painter. Through the Duke of Norfolk he was introduced to the Beefsteak Club, where he met with the most distinguished persons of the time. His portraits reflected accurate details of his sitters that may have been regarded as unflattering.

== Gallery ==
Portrait of William Manning, 1814

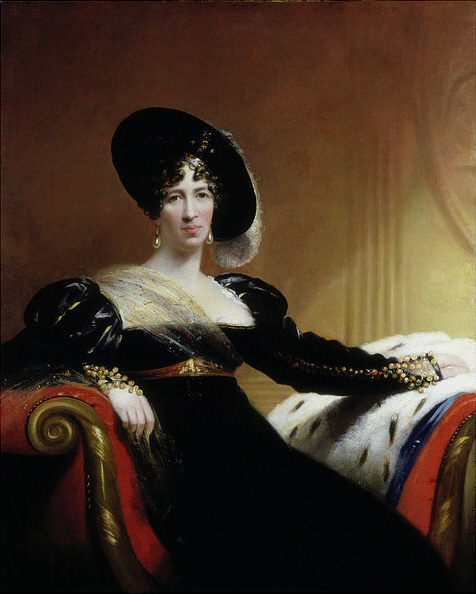
Portrait of Lady Anne Hamilton, 1815

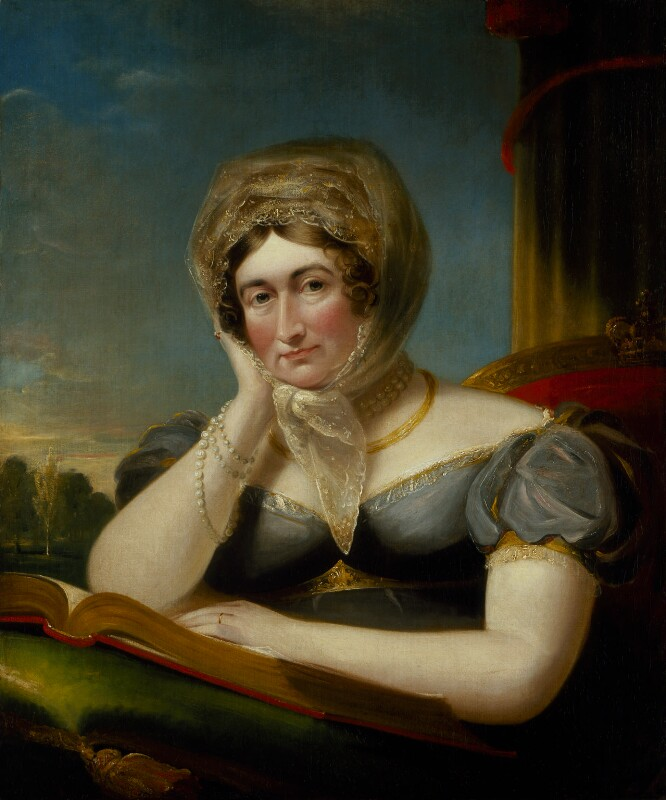
Portrait of Caroline of Brunswick, 1820

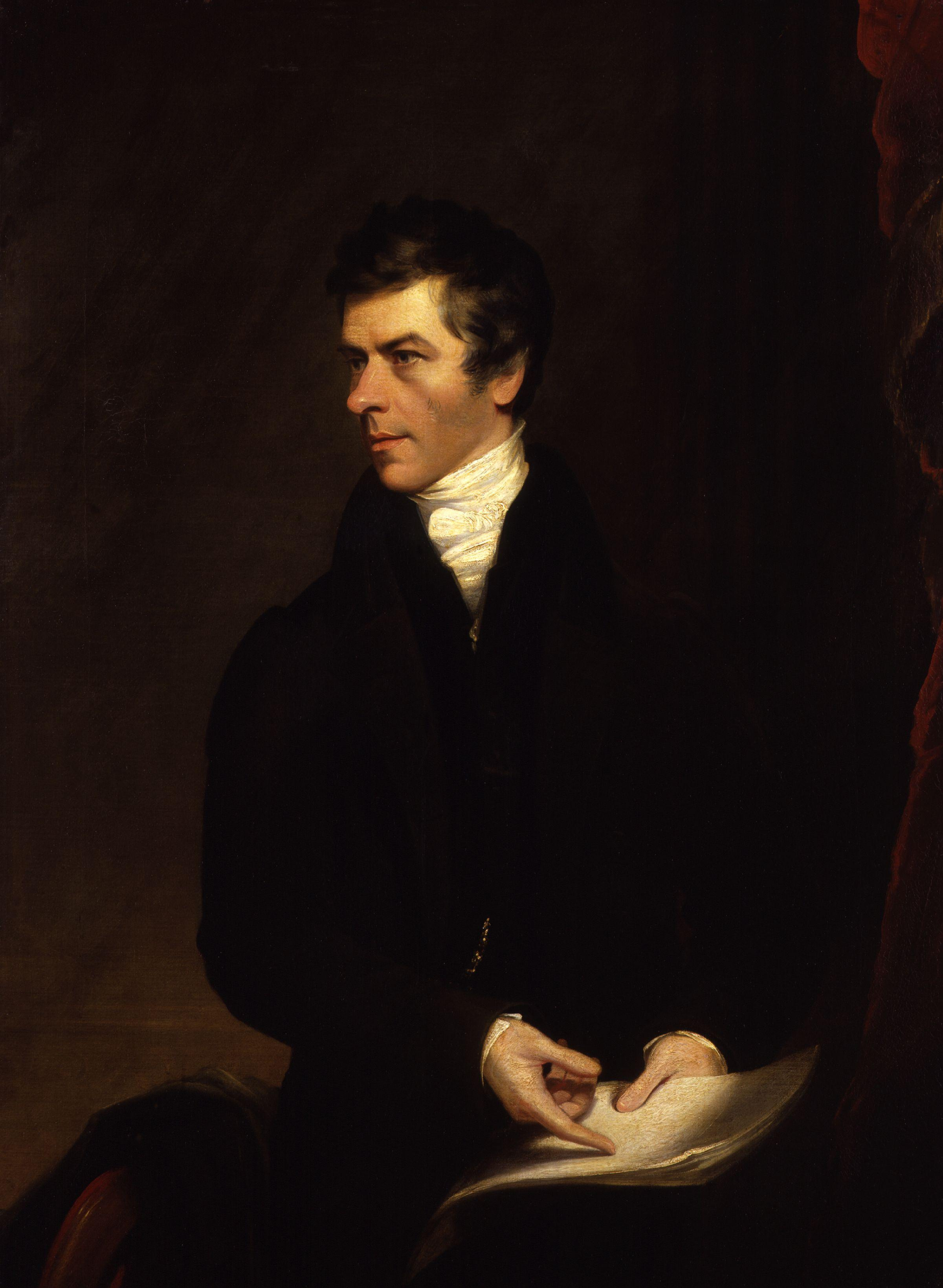
Portrait of Lord Brougham, 1821

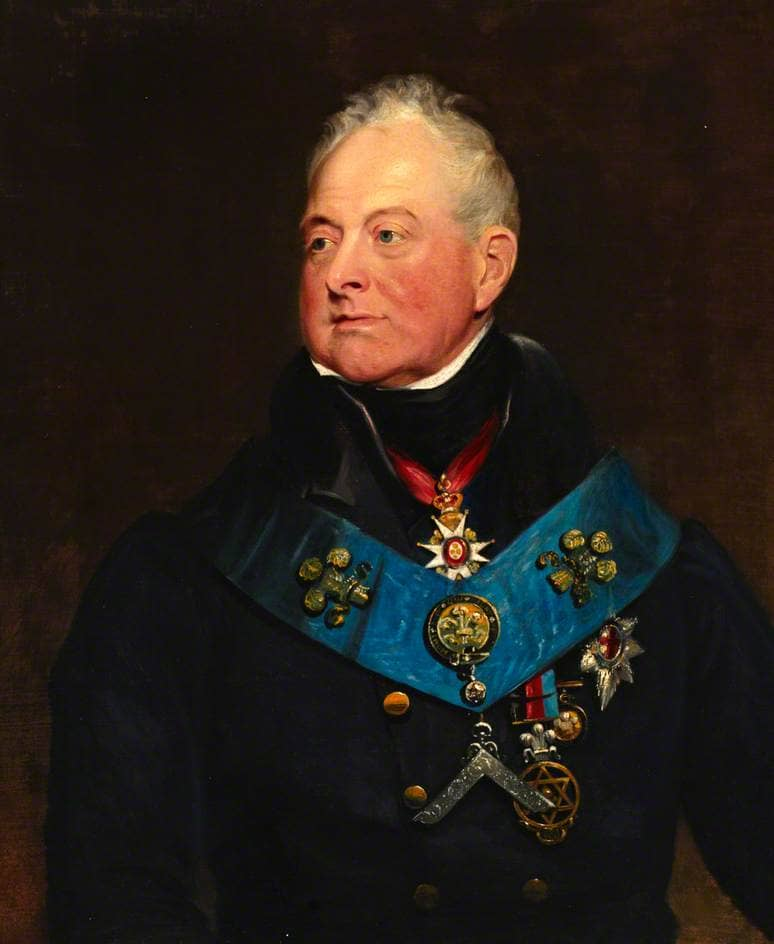
Portrait of William IV, 1830
