= John Douglas (Royal Marines officer) =

Sir John Douglas (died 4 March 1814) was a British officer of the Royal Marines who, with his wife Charlotte, Lady Douglas, was involved in a scandal regarding an allegedly illegitimate child born to the Princess of Wales, Caroline of Brunswick.

== Life ==
Douglas was born at Jean Fields, Dalkeith, near Edinburgh; he was the son of Louis Douglas, Esq.; his grandfather was a lord of Session. He began his military service at age 13. Commissioned as a second lieutenant in the Royal Marines on 14 February 1776, he was promoted to first lieutenant on 9 April 1778. While serving as on recruitment duties in Gloucester, he met Charlotte Hopkinson, daughter of Lieutenant-Colonel George Caesar Hopkinson, late of the 15th Dragoons. Her family were acquaintances of antiquarian Samuel Lysons. Colonel Hopkinson bought the estate of Wotton in 1790.

A captain, 29 April 1783, Douglas became major in the Army, 1 March 1794. He married 17 June 1797, at Gloucester, to Charlotte, daughter of a private soldier, named Hephinson or Hopkinson, who was soon made a Sergeant; later becoming an army agent and subsequently became a colonel, wealthy with an estate near Gloucester. He was promoted to lieutenant-colonel in the Army, 1 January 1798

Mentioned in dispatches by Sydney Smith for actions at Acre (as temporary Colonel), Douglas commanded British marines and Ottoman forces at the retaking of El-Arish.

He was knighted on 2 April 1800, Equerry to Duke of Sussex 15 September 1802. Promotion followed as Major and Captain Royal Marines, 19 July 1803, and Lieutenant-Colonel Royal Marines, 15 August 1805, and promoted Colonel in the Army, 25 April 1808. On 4 June 1811 he was promoted from Colonel to Major-General in the Army.

== The Delicate Investigation ==
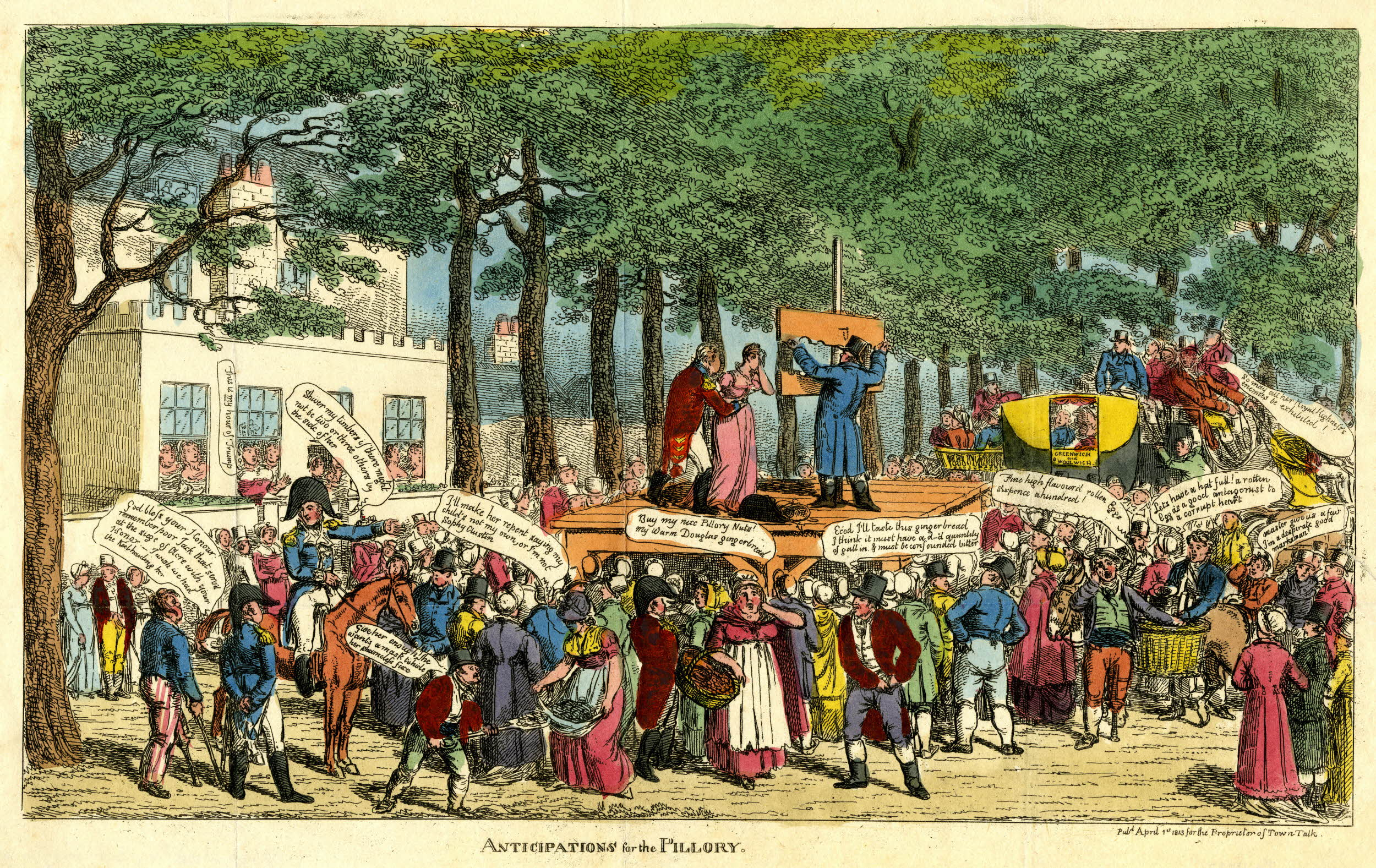
Satirical cartoon showing Sir John and Lady Douglas being led to the pillory outside Montagu House, Blackheath, after being discredited in giving evidence against Queen Caroline.

Douglas lived in Greenwich, near to Montagu House, Blackheath, the location of alleged affairs between Queen Caroline and various lovers, investigated as part of "The Delicate Investigation" in 1806. Douglas and his wife Charlotte gave testimony to the investigation. Lady Douglas had been Caroline's companion, living for a time at Montagu House before their friendship broke down, and rumours about scandalous events at the house began to circulate; Lady Douglas alleged that Caroline had admitted to having had an illegitimate child, William Austin. The investigation cleared Caroline of adultery (and poured doubt on the Douglas's testimony) but questioned other aspects of Caroline's behaviour. However, public sympathy tended to side with Caroline; an 1813 cartoon following the "Delicate Investigation" showed the ridiculed Sir John and Lady Douglas being led to a pillory erected outside Montagu House.

More details about the Delicate Investigation from The Book of Spencer Perceval

== Death ==
Sir John Douglas died at Maze Hill on 4 March 1814. According to The Gentleman's Magazine, "his death was occasioned by a complaint (from which he was never since been free) contracted whilst serving with the Turkish Army in the Deserts of El Arish, arising from the quantity of sand in the water which the army was constrained to use, in consequence of the Enemy having possession of the wells". His coffin, decorated with the flag under which he served at Acre and the sword of the French commandant who surrendered at El Arish, was transported in grand procession for burial at Charlton church on 11 March. A book of Verses to the Memory of Sir John Douglas was published, dedicated by permission to his widow.
