= Princess Caroline of Brunswick-Wolfenbüttel (painting) =

1804 painting by Thomas Lawrence

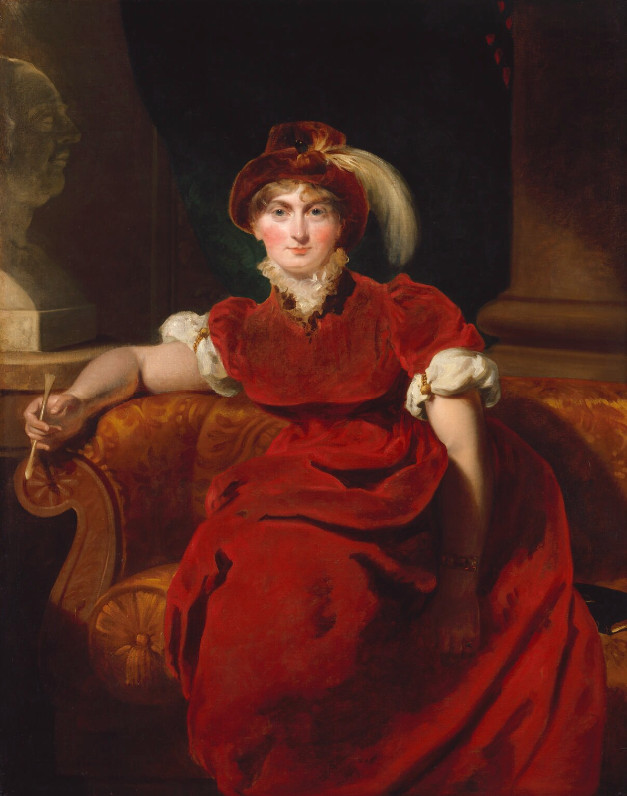
- Artist: Thomas Lawrence
- Year: 1804
- Medium: Oil on canvas
- Dimensions: 140.3 cm × 111.8 cm (55.2 in × 44.0 in)
- Location: National Portrait Gallery; London

Princess Caroline of Brunswick-Wolfenbüttel is an oil on canvas portrait painting by the English artist Thomas Lawrence depicting Caroline of Brunswick, the estranged wife of the then-Prince of Wales. It was created in 1804.

== History and description ==
Lawrence, the top portrait painter of the era, had previously created a dual portrait of Caroline and her daughter Princess Charlotte in 1801. Rumours about an alleged affair between Caroline and Lawrence were later a part of the 1806 delicate investigation, a failed attempt by George to secure a divorce from his wife.

It is a frequently reproduced image of Caroline. She wears a red velvet dress, which shows the influence of Renaissance styles on the fashions of the day. On the left is a bust of her father, the Duke of Brunswick, which Caroline had herself sculpted. The painting is today exhibited at the National Portrait Gallery in London.

== Bibliography ==
- Black, Jeremy. The Hanoverians: The History of a Dynasty. ISBN 1852854464. A&C Black, 2007.
- Crane, David, Hebron, Stephen & Woof, Robert. Romantics & Revolutionaries: Regency Portraits from the National Portrait Gallery London. National Portrait Gallery, 2002.
- Fraser, Flora. The Unruly Queen: The Life of Queen Caroline. ISBN 0307456366. A&C Black, 2012.
