= Lady Anne Hamilton (1766–1846) =

British courtier

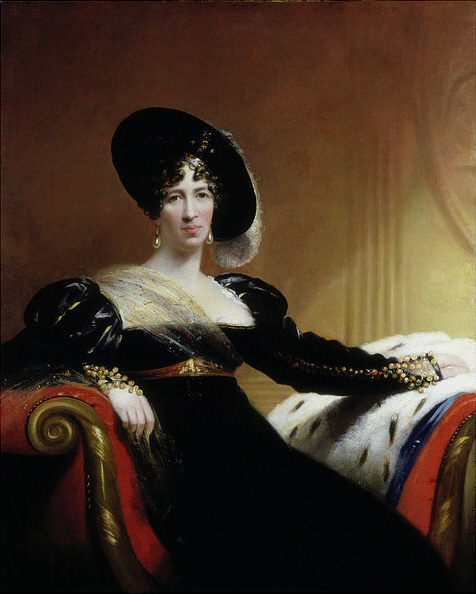
- by James Lonsdale
- Born: 16 March 1766
- Died: 10 October 1846 (aged 80); Islington, London, England
- Occupation: Lady-in-Waiting
- Employer: Queen Caroline
- Parent(s): Archibald Hamilton, 9th Duke of Hamilton; Lady Harriet Stewart

Lady Anne Hamilton (16 March 1766 – 10 October 1846) was a courtier and writer, and friend of the British queen Caroline of Brunswick.

== Life ==
Lady Anne Hamilton was born in 1766. She was the daughter of Archibald Hamilton, 9th Duke of Hamilton.

She became a lady-in-waiting to Caroline of Brunswick, Princess of Wales and estranged wife of the Prince Regent, replacing Hester Lisle in 1812. She held this post until the following year, when the Princess went into voluntary exile in Italy.

Lady Anne had radical sensibilities and on the Prince succeeding as George IV on 29 January 1820, repeatedly urged Caroline to return and claim her position as Queen Consort of Great Britain. She and radicals such as Henry Brougham and William Cobbett saw the Queen as a focus for the reformist Whig opposition. She crossed to France to meet Caroline at St. Omer, and with Alderman Matthew Wood, a radical former Lord Mayor of London, escorted her back to the capital. She resumed her position in Caroline's household, accompanying her to her trial for adultery in the House of Lords in August 1820, and remaining almost her sole supporter among ladies of consequence until her acquittal. When Caroline sought admittance to the Coronation in Westminster Abbey to take her rightful place beside George on 19 July 1821, Lady Anne Hamilton and Lady Hood were her two ladies-in-waiting. Being debarred and humiliated broke Caroline's spirit, and Hamilton was with her until her death on 7 August 1821 and her burial in Brunswick later that month.

Lady Anne was described by Creevey, at the trial, as "full six feet high and bears a striking resemblance to one of Lord Derby's great red deer"

Lady Anne Hamilton published a satirical epic poem called Epics of the Ton in 1807. The work, which was published anonymously, satirised the main figures involved in what was called "The Delicate Investigation" of the morality and suspected adultery of Caroline of Brunswick. Hamilton referred to the main characters by their initials.

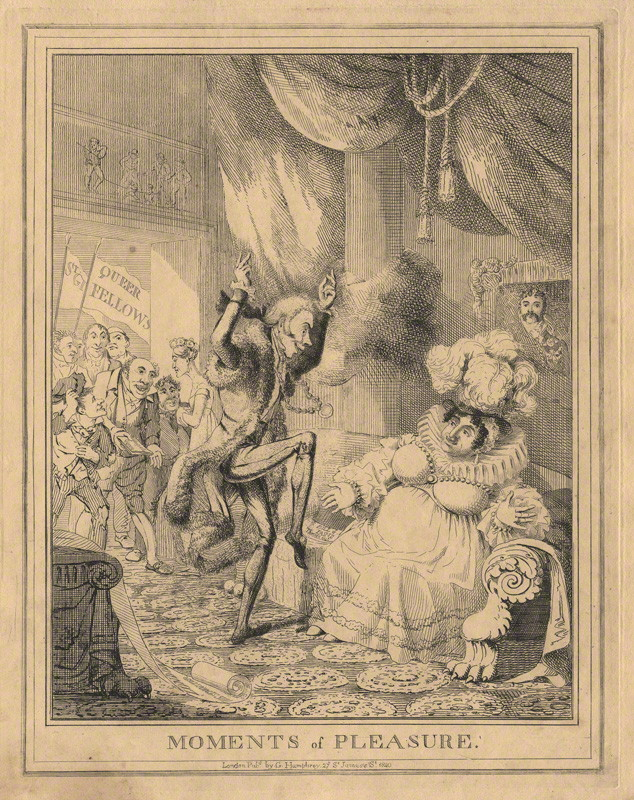
Moments of Pleasure - a satirical print by Theodore Lane incorporating Lady Anne Hamilton; Sir Matthew Wood, 1st Bt and Caroline of Brunswick.

In 1805 and in 1815 she was painted by James Lonsdale and these portraits were exhibited at the Royal Academy. Lady Anne was also included in a number of satirical prints by Theodore Lane in 1820 and 1821.

In 1832 a book was published which claimed to reveal facts about the royal household. It was titled Secret History of the Court of England from the accession of George the Third until the Death of George the Fourth and was attributed to "Lady Anne Hamilton". This book was written by a woman who had gained Hamilton's confidence and is referred to as "S.W." in correspondence. A strong suspect for this role is Olivia Serres (born Wilmot). The resulting scandal meant that the publisher had to flee to avoid prosecution and Hamilton had to spend some time in France. However a subsequent biographer of Queen Caroline attributes the record of her demeanour and words as she lay dying directly to Hamilton as author of this work.

Hamilton died in White Lion Street, Islington, in 1846. She was buried in Kensal Green Cemetery.

== Works ==
Hamilton was said to have been the author of two publications. However one of these was a forgery.
