= Montagu House, Blackheath =

Demolished residence in London

Coordinates: 51.4728°N 0.0010°W

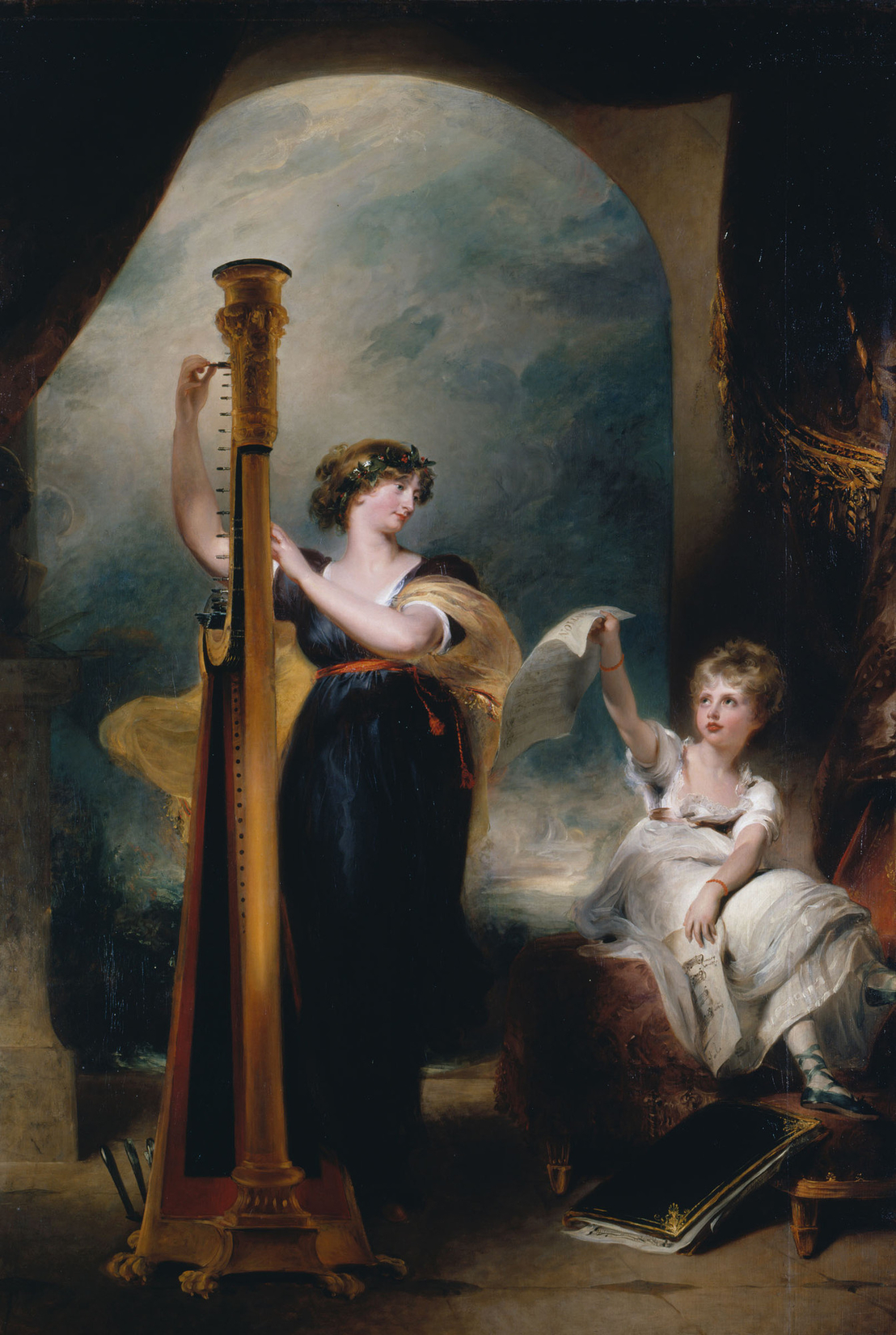
Thomas Lawrence's 1801 Portrait of Caroline and her daughter at Montagu House.

Montagu House (sometimes also spelt Montague) was a prominent residence situated near to the southwest corner of Greenwich Park (today the junction of Charlton Way and Chesterfield Walk), overlooking the common at Blackheath in what is today southeast London. Adjacent to the Ranger's House, it was the royal residence of Caroline of Brunswick before being demolished in 1815.

== History ==
The house was built as a country residence for Ralph Montagu, 1st Duke of Montagu in the late 17th century. Two adjacent buildings, Montagu House and Park Corner House, were constructed, with the latter being occupied for a time by a George Moult (it was briefly known as 'Mole's Corner') and the subject of a drawing (c. 1781) by Paul Sandby now held by the British Museum.

The freedman and (later) writer, Ignatius Sancho, was for two years (1749 to 1751) butler to the family of John Montagu, 2nd Duke of Montagu at Montagu House, returning to the family's service in 1766 as valet to the duke's son-in-law.

Leased from the Duchess of Buccleuch, Montagu House later became the residence of the estranged wife of the Prince Regent (later King George IV). Caroline of Brunswick lived in the house from 1799 to 1812 (other sources suggest 1797 or 1798 to 1814) after she had given birth to Princess Charlotte, who lived with a governess at the nearby mansion of the Duchess of Brunswick (today the Ranger's House). A contemporary account by a Miss Aikin described Montagu House:

"The princess's villa at Blackheath is an incongruous piece of patchwork; it may dazzle for a moment when lighted up at night, but it is all glitter, and glare, and trick; everything is tinsel and trumpery about it; it is altogether like a bad dream."

In 1801 Caroline's Mistress of the Robes Lady Townshend commissioned the artist Thomas Lawrence to paint Caroline with her young daughter Princess Charlotte. Lawrence produced an acclaimed dual portrait, although the painting of the picture (where he had sometimes stayed over at Montagu House) later became part of a public scandal in which it was alleged Lawrence had an affair with Caroline.

=== The Delicate Investigation ===
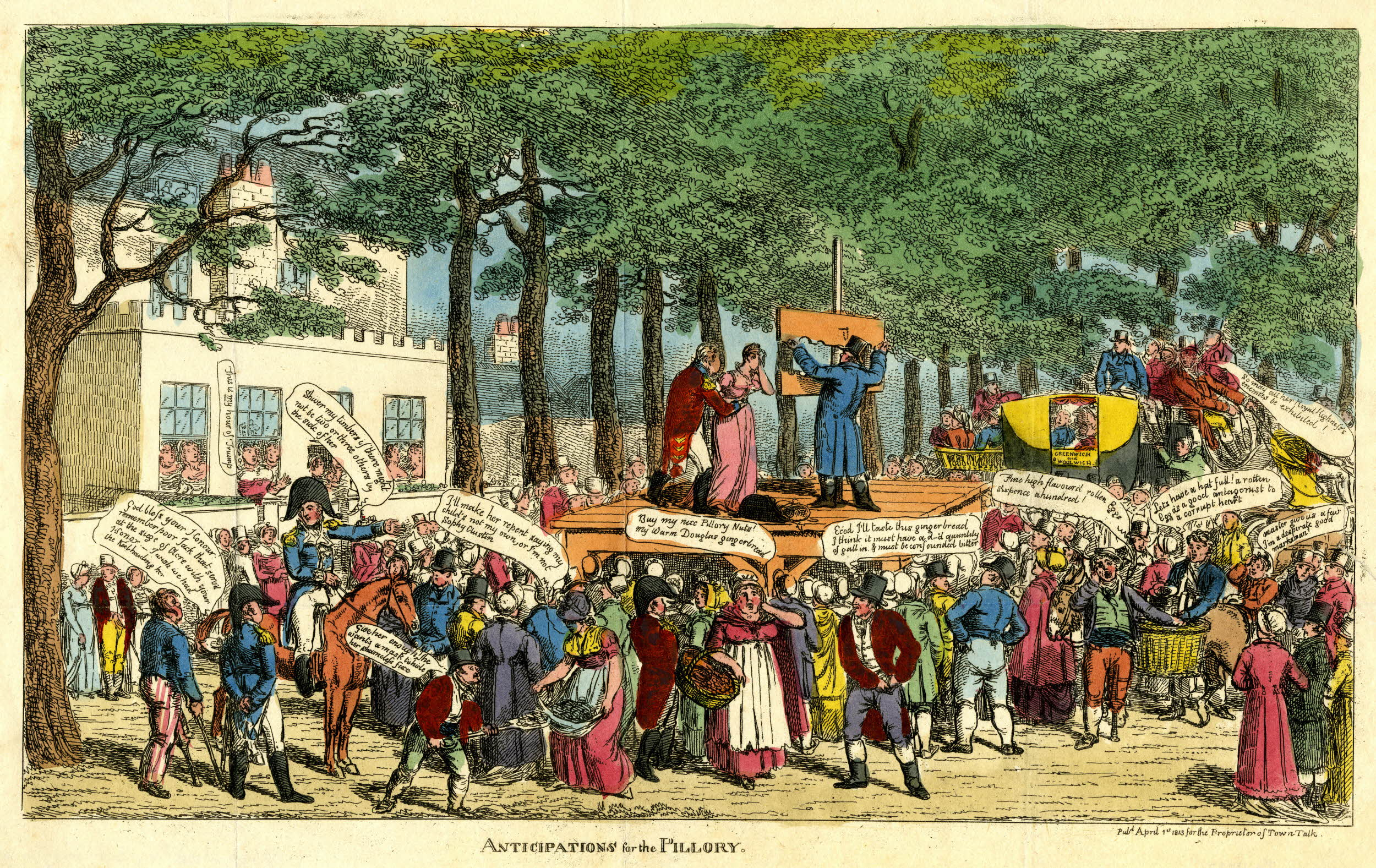
Satirical cartoon showing Sir John and Lady Douglas being led to the pillory outside Montagu House, Blackheath, after being discredited in giving evidence against Queen Caroline.

Montagu House was the location of alleged affairs between Queen Caroline and various lovers, investigated as part of "The Delicate Investigation" in 1806 and which heard testimony from neighbours in Greenwich, Major-General Sir John Douglas and his wife Charlotte. Lady Douglas became Caroline's companion, living for a time at Montagu House before their friendship broke down, and rumours about scandalous events at the house began to circulate; Lady Douglas alleged that Caroline had admitted to having had an illegitimate child, William Austin. A secretive investigation cleared Caroline of adultery (and poured doubt on the Douglas testimonies) but questioned other aspects of Caroline's behaviour. However, public sympathy tended to side with Caroline; an 1813 cartoon following the "Delicate Investigation" showed the ridiculed Sir John and Lady Douglas being led to a pillory erected outside Montagu House.

Candid miniature portrait of Princess Caroline (of Brunswick) painted by Eduard Stroely ca. 1804 when she was living at Montagu House

All the Montagu House buildings were demolished in 1815 (the site is now occupied by the Chesterfield Walk tennis courts). A rear wall, now part of the Park wall, survives as does, inside the Park, a plunge bath called 'Queen Caroline's bath', previously situated in an area enclosed by Caroline when she created a lawn and pleasure ground after being appointed Ranger of Greenwich Park in 1806. Plaques commemorating Caroline and Sancho are set in the wall nearby.

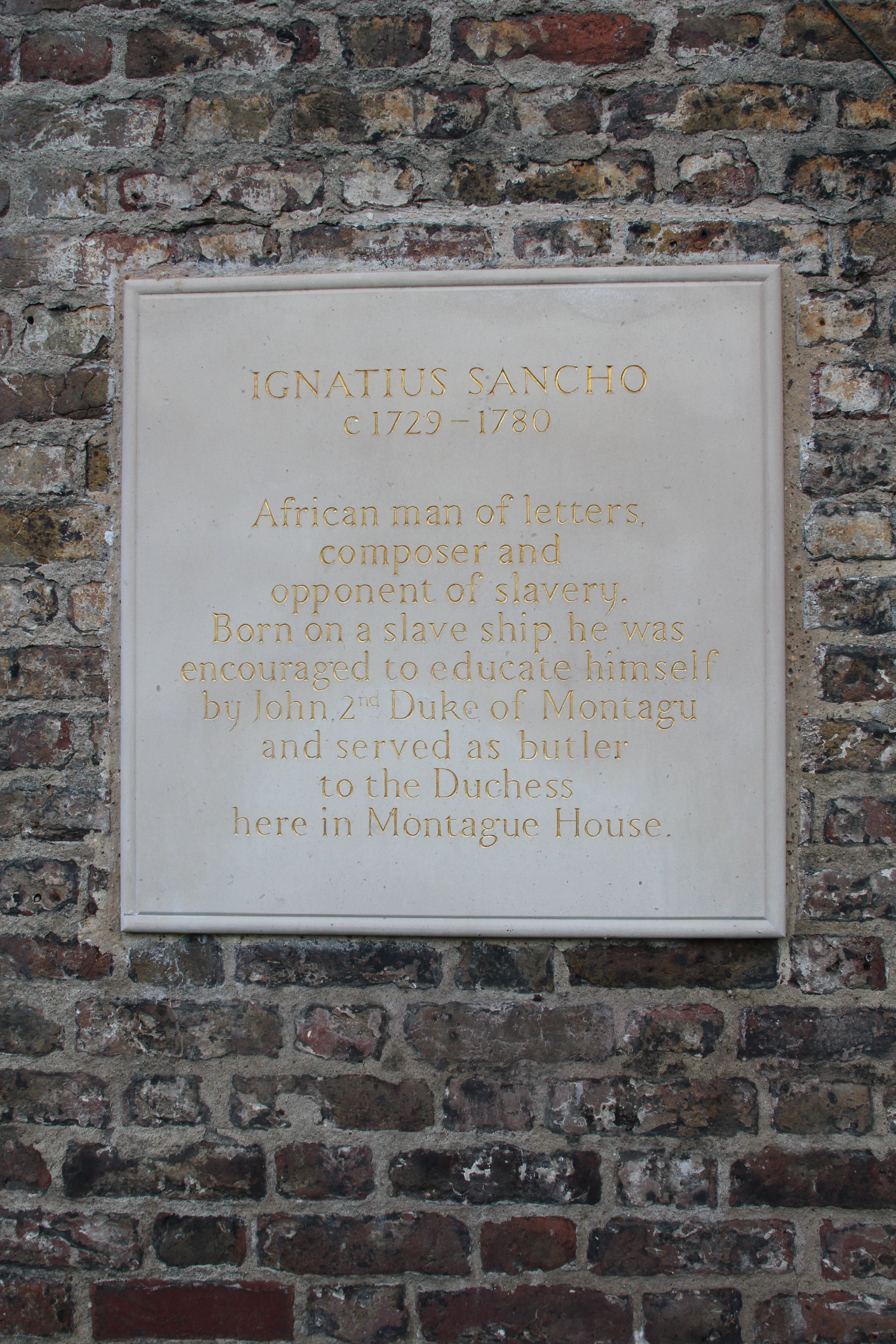
Plaque to Ignatius Sancho

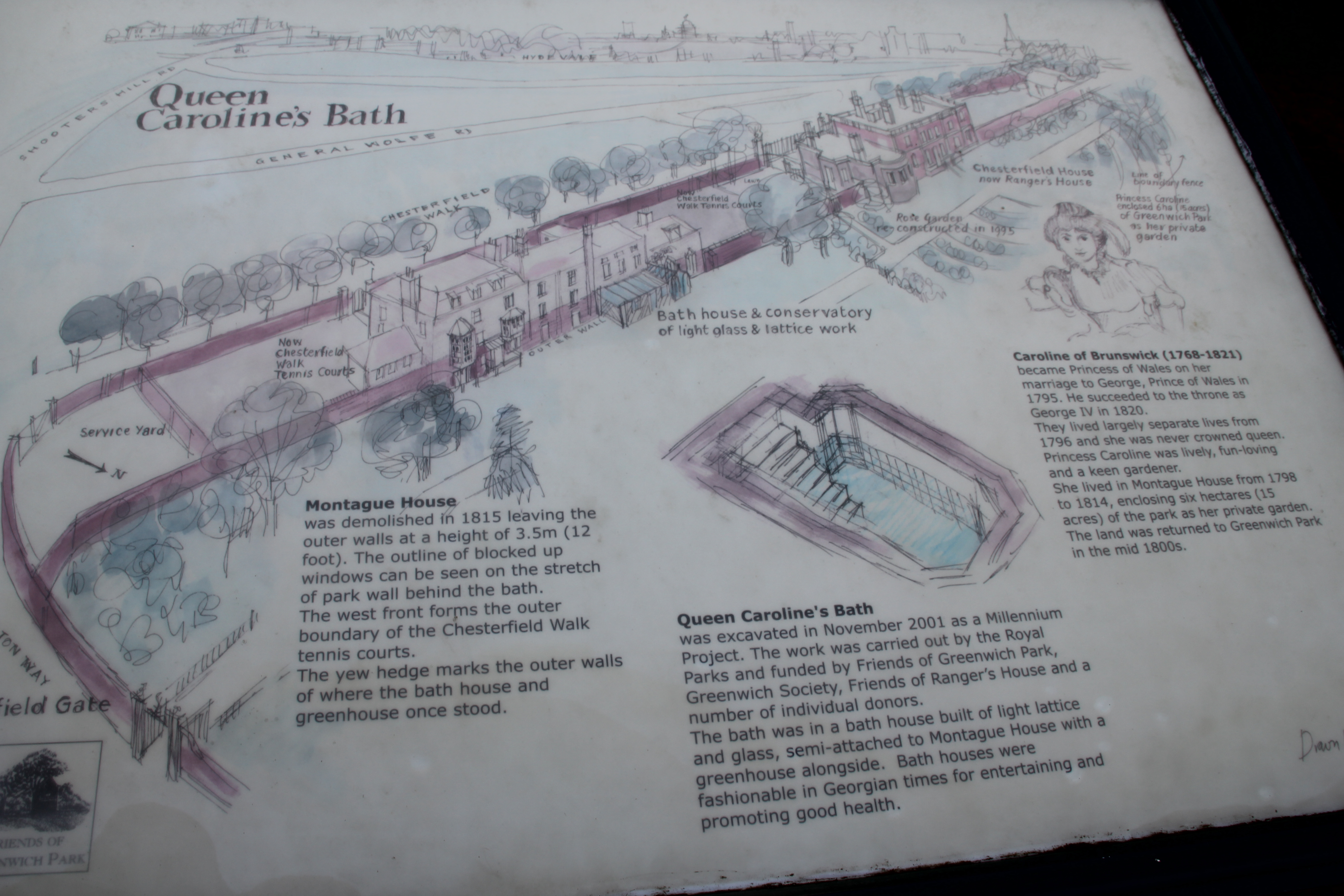
Montagu House description

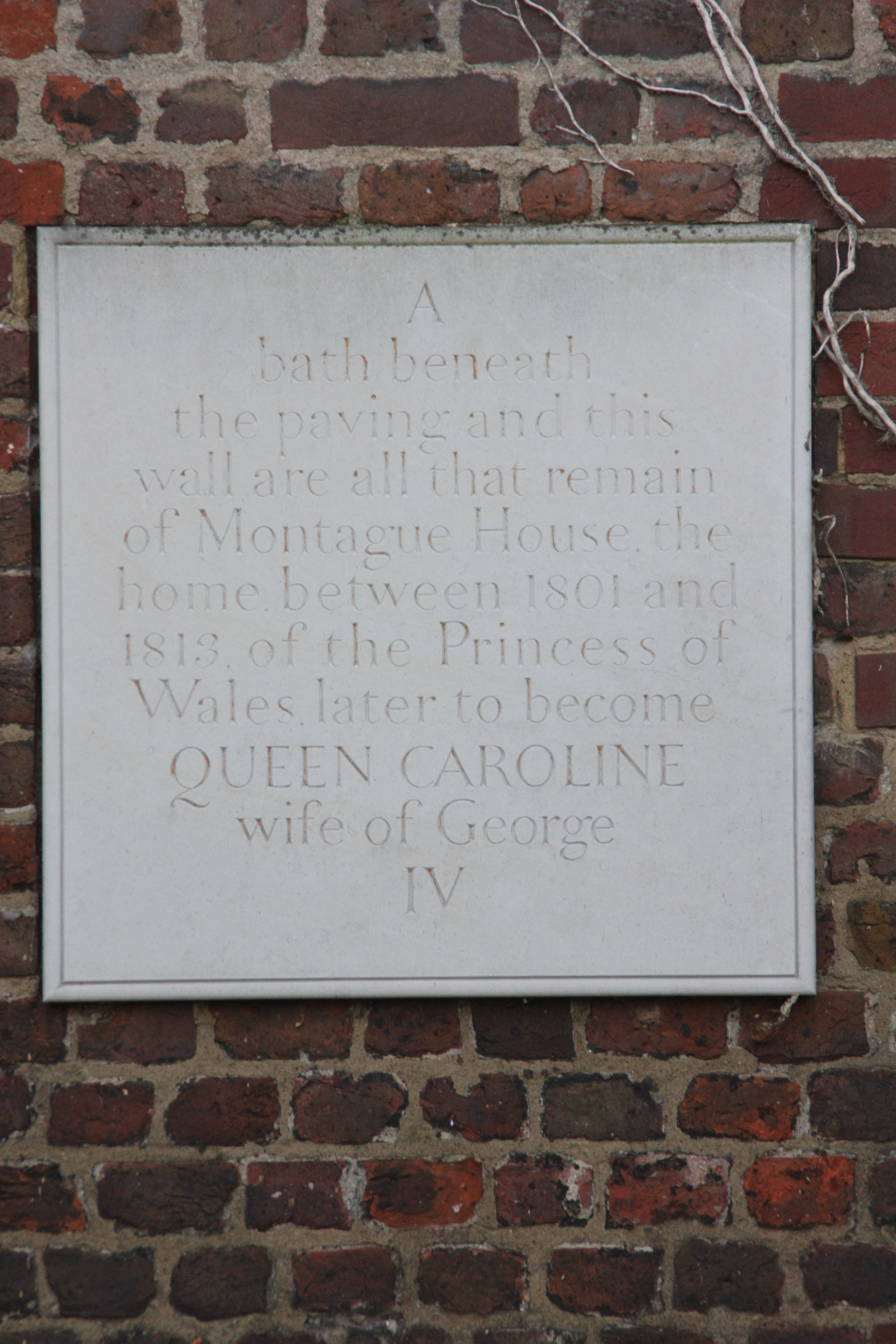
Plaque to Queen Caroline

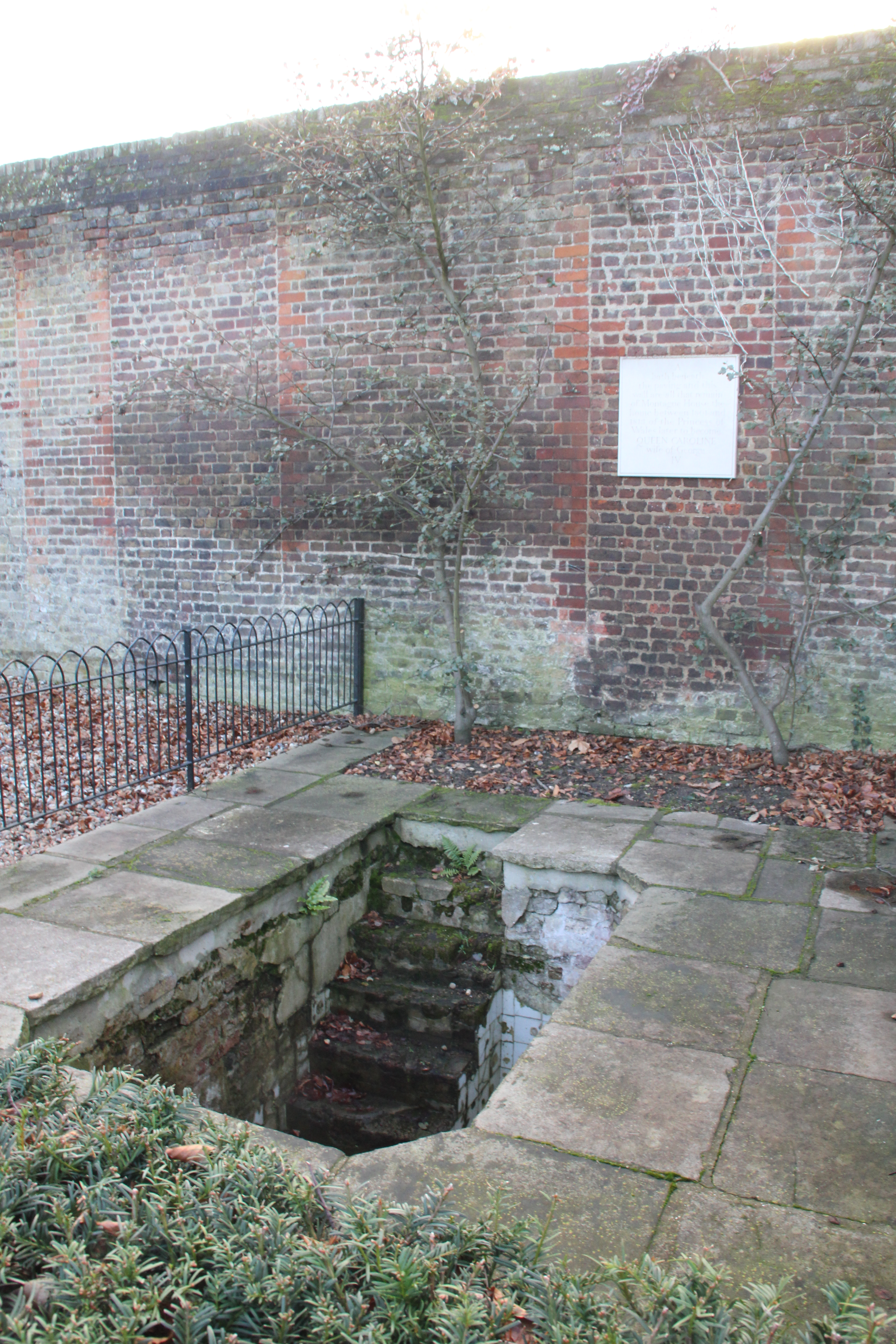
Queen Caroline's Bath

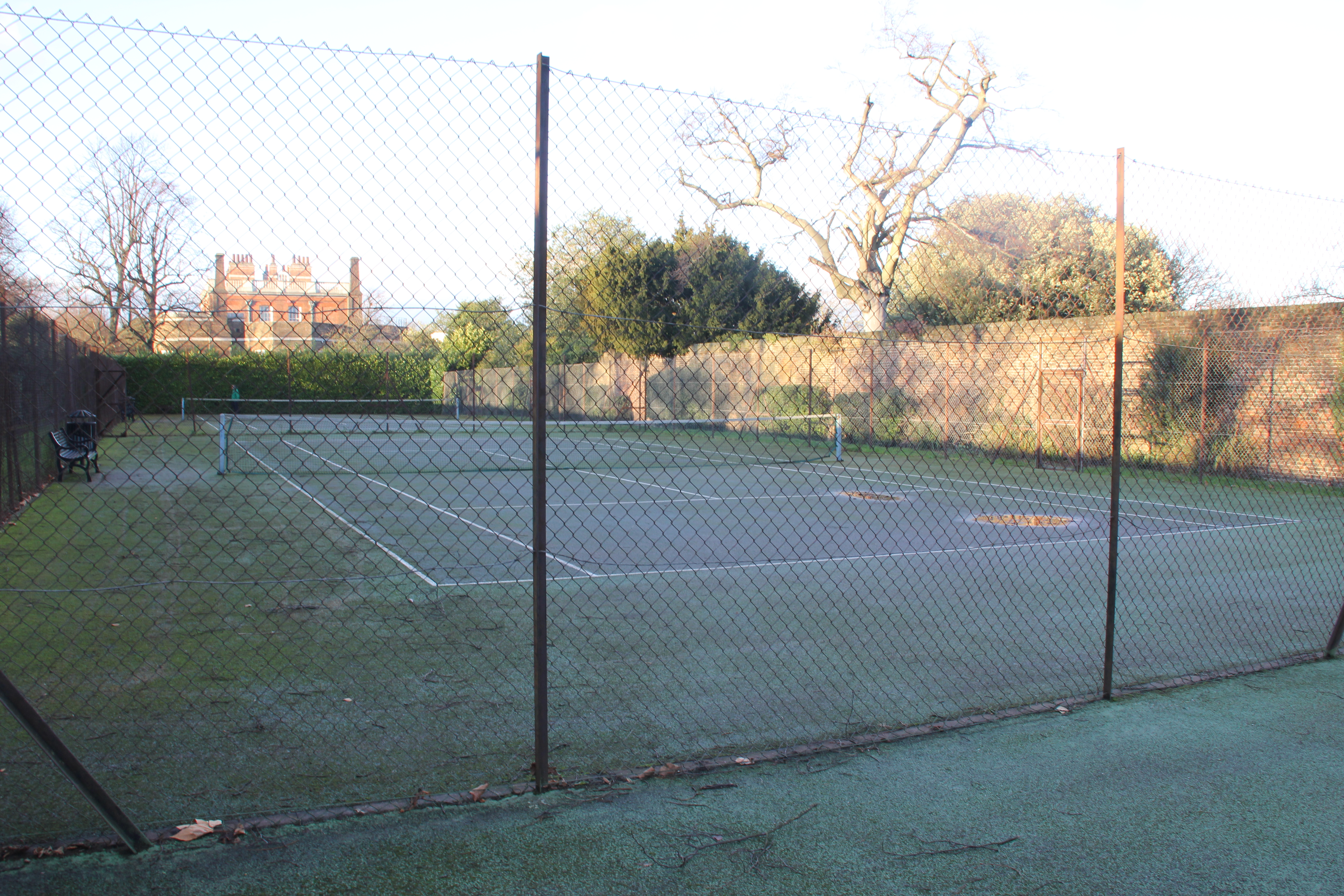
Site of Montagu House (Ranger's House in background)
