= Princess Charlotte of Wales (1796–1817) =

British princess

Princess Charlotte
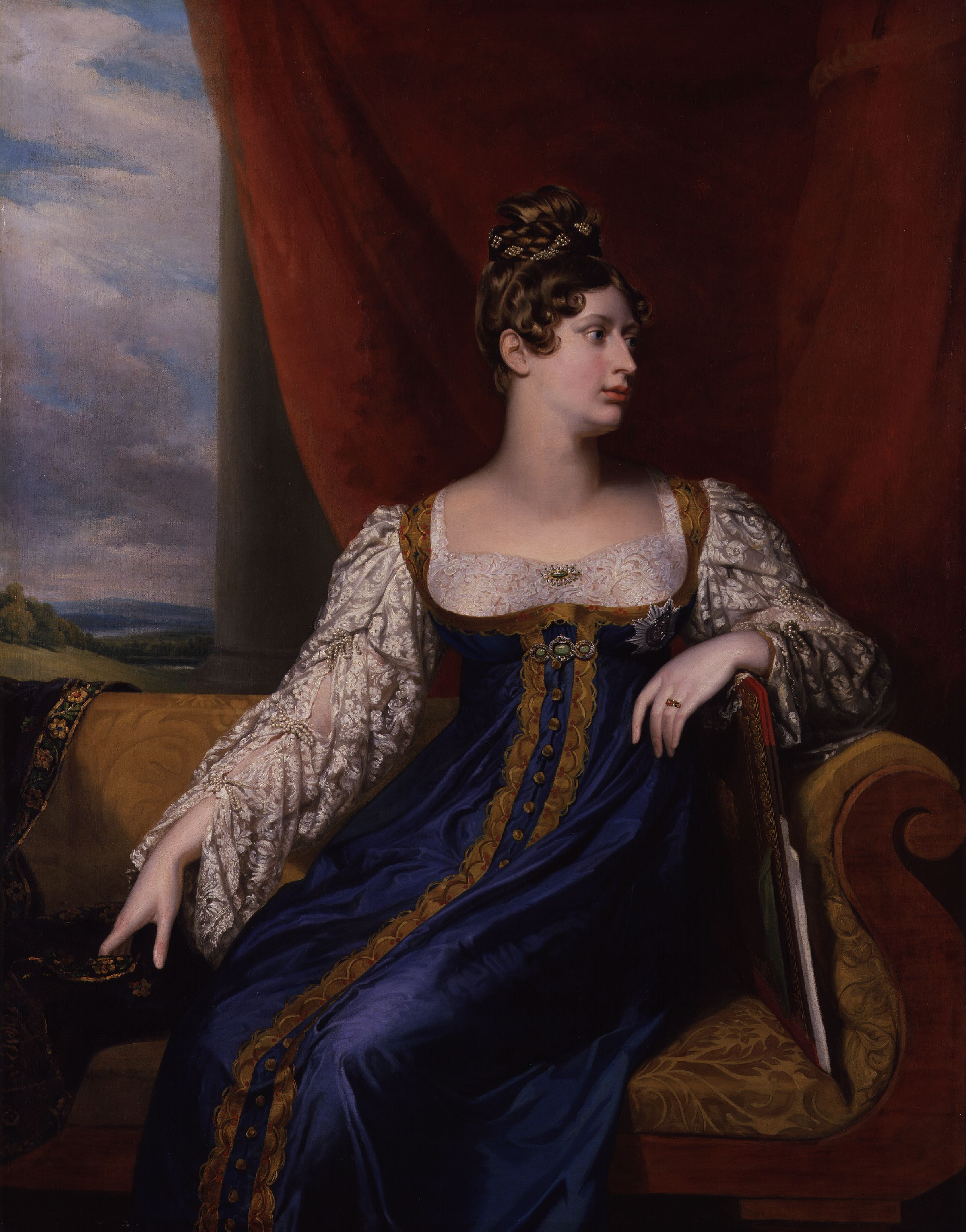
- Portrait of Princess Charlotte of Wales (1817)
- Born: 7 January 1796; Carlton House, London, England
- Died: 6 November 1817 (aged 21); Claremont House, Surrey, England
- Burial: 19 November 1817; Royal Vault, St George's Chapel, Windsor Castle, England
- Spouse: Prince Leopold of Saxe-Coburg-Saalfeld (later Leopold I of Belgium) (m. 1816)
Names
- Charlotte Augusta
- House: Hanover
- Father: George, Prince of Wales (later George IV)
- Mother: Caroline of Brunswick

Princess Charlotte of Wales (Charlotte Augusta; 7 January 1796 – 6 November 1817) was the only child of George, Prince of Wales (later George IV), and Caroline of Brunswick. She was expected to ascend the British throne after the deaths of her grandfather, George III, and her father, but died in childbirth at the age of 21, predeceasing them both.

Charlotte's parents disliked each other from before their arranged marriage and soon separated. The Prince of Wales left most of Charlotte's care to governesses and servants, only allowing her limited contact with her mother, who eventually left the country. As Charlotte grew to adulthood, her father pressured her to marry William, Hereditary Prince of Orange (later King of the Netherlands). After initially accepting him, Charlotte soon broke off the intended match. This resulted in an extended contest of wills between her and her father, who finally permitted her to marry Leopold of Saxe-Coburg-Saalfeld (later the first King of the Belgians). After a year and a half of happy marriage, Charlotte died after giving birth to a stillborn son.

Charlotte's death set off tremendous mourning among the British, who had seen her as a sign of hope and a contrast to both her unpopular father and her mentally ill grandfather. She had been George III's only legitimate grandchild and her death prompted a succession crisis, as there was a chance the throne would pass to a distant relative. The King's aging and unmarried sons desperately looked for wives; it was his fourth son, Prince Edward, Duke of Kent and Strathearn, who fathered the eventual heir, Victoria.

== Birth ==
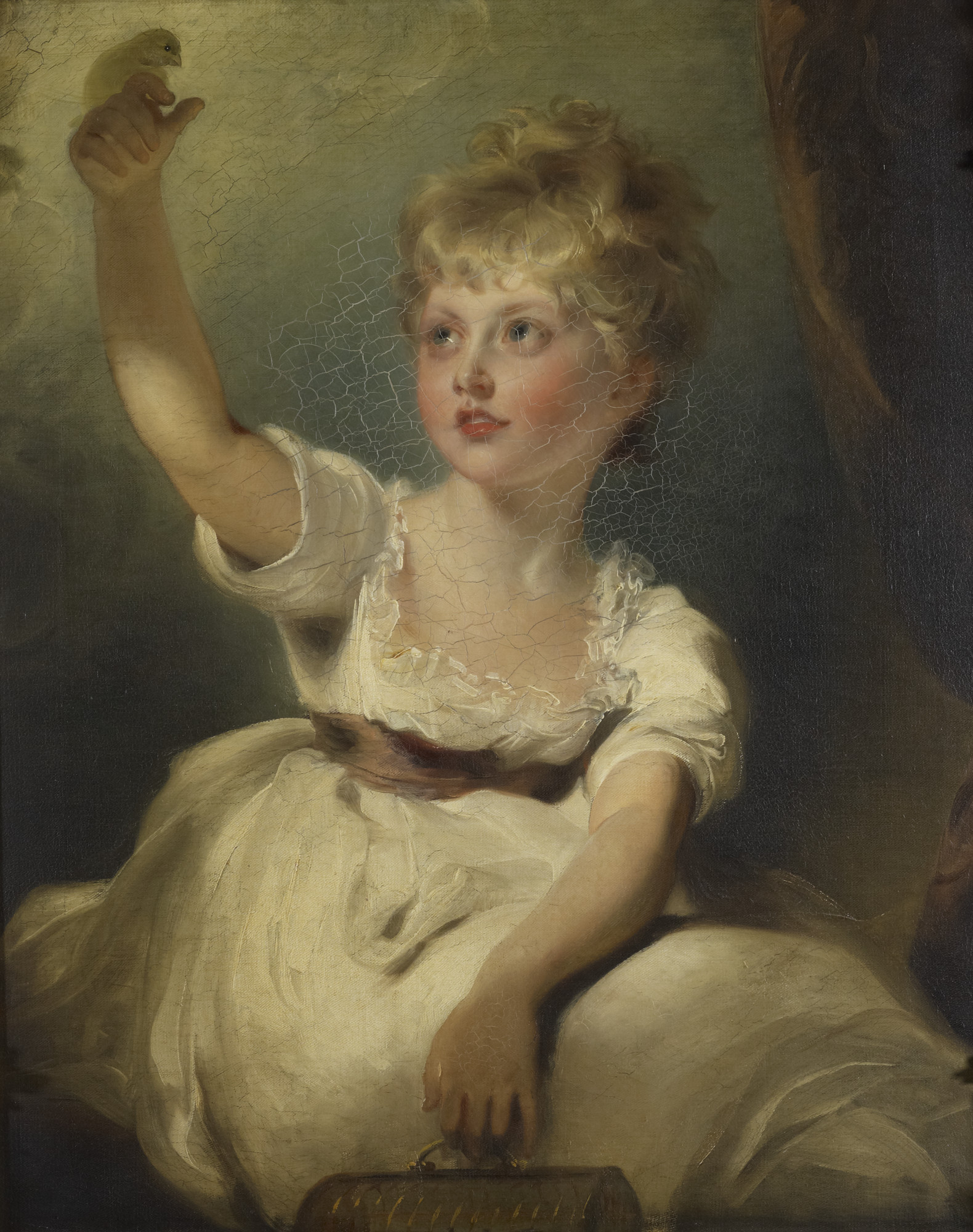
Charlotte as a young girl

In 1794 George, Prince of Wales, sought a suitable bride because he was promised an increased income if he married. His choice was his German cousin Caroline of Brunswick, although he had never met her. They were repelled by one another when they first met, but the marriage went ahead on 8 April 1795. The couple ended up separating within weeks, though they remained under the same roof. George later stated that they had only had sexual relations three times.

Caroline gave birth to a daughter at their residence, Carlton House, London on 7 January 1796. While George was mildly unhappy that she was not a boy, King George III, who preferred female babies, was delighted at the birth of his first legitimate grandchild, and hoped that the birth would serve to reconcile George and Caroline. This did not come to pass, however. Three days after the birth, George drew up a will directing that his wife have no role in the upbringing of their child, and bequeathed all his worldly goods to his mistress, Maria Fitzherbert. Caroline was left one shilling. Many members of the royal family were unpopular but the nation celebrated the princess's birth. On 11 February 1796, she was christened Charlotte Augusta, after her grandmothers, Queen Charlotte and Augusta, Duchess of Brunswick-Lüneburg, in the Great Drawing Room at Carlton House by John Moore, Archbishop of Canterbury. Her godparents were the King, the Queen and Augusta (for whom Charlotte, Princess Royal, stood proxy).

Despite Caroline's demands for better treatment now that she had given birth to the second-in-line to the throne, George restricted her contact with the child, forbidding her to see their daughter except in the presence of a nurse and governess. Caroline was allowed the usual daily visit which upper class parents paid to their young offspring at this time; she was not allowed any say in the decisions made about Charlotte's care. Sympathetic household staff disobeyed the Prince and allowed Caroline to be alone with her daughter. George was unaware of this, having little contact with Charlotte himself. Caroline was even bold enough to ride through the streets of London in a carriage with her daughter, to the applause of the crowds.

== Childhood ==
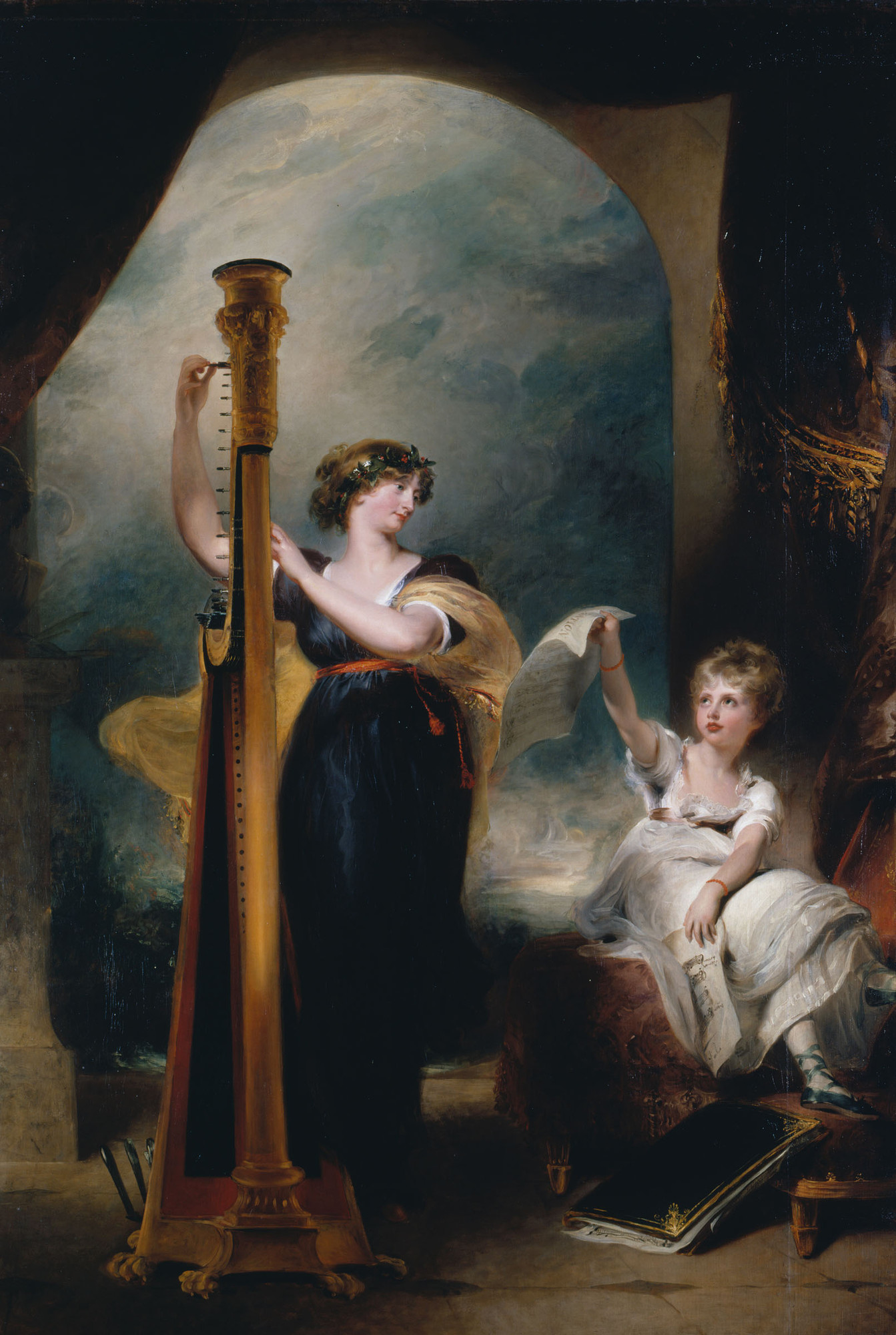
Caroline tuning the harp beside Charlotte in 1800. Caroline was later accused of having an affair with the artist Sir Thomas Lawrence while he was painting the portrait.

Charlotte was a healthy child, and according to her biographer Thea Holme, "The impression one gets from all the early recorded stories of Charlotte is of a happy recklessness, and a warm heart." As Charlotte grew, her parents continued to battle, and to use the young girl as a pawn in their conflict, with both parents appealing to the King and Queen to take their side. In August 1797, Caroline left Carlton House, establishing herself in a rented home near Blackheath and leaving her daughter behind—at the time, English law considered the father's rights to minor children paramount. However, the Prince took no action to further restrict Caroline's access to her daughter. In December 1798, the Prince invited his estranged wife to spend the winter at Carlton House, which she refused to do. It was the last serious effort at reconciliation, and its failure meant there was little likelihood that George would have a legitimate son who would come between Charlotte and the British throne. Caroline visited her daughter at Carlton House, and sometimes Charlotte was driven out to Blackheath to visit her mother, but was never allowed to stay overnight in her mother's house. During the summers, the Prince leased Shrewsbury Lodge at Blackheath for his daughter, which made visiting easier, and according to Alison Plowden, who wrote of George's relationship with his wife and daughter, Caroline probably saw as much of her daughter as she wanted to.

When Charlotte was eight, her father, whose affections had returned to Fitzherbert, decided that he wanted Carlton House to himself. He took over his wife's apartments (Caroline received space in Kensington Palace instead), and moved their daughter into Warwick House, adjacent to Carlton House. As James Chambers, another Charlotte biographer, put it, the young Princess "lived in a household of her own, in the company of no one who was not paid to be there". The move took place without the presence of Charlotte's governess, Lady Elgin, with whom she was very close. The governess had been forced to retire, ostensibly on account of age, but most likely because George was angry that she had taken the girl to see the King without George's permission. George also dismissed the sub-governess, Miss Hayman, for being too friendly with Caroline—and the Princess of Wales promptly hired her. Lady Elgin's replacement, Lady de Clifford, was fond of Charlotte, and too good-natured to discipline the child, who had grown into an exuberant tomboy. Lady de Clifford brought one of her grandsons, the Honourable George Keppel, three years younger than Charlotte, as a playmate for her. Forty years later, Keppel, by then Earl of Albemarle, would remember Charlotte in his memoirs, the source of many of the anecdotes of Charlotte as a small girl. In addition to tomboy tales of horses and fisticuffs, he remembered them seeing a crowd gathered outside the Keppel house at Earl's Court, who were hoping to see the young Princess. The two children went outside and joined the crowd, unrecognised.

In 1805 the King began making plans for Charlotte's education, and engaged a large staff of instructors for his only legitimate grandchild, with the Bishop of Exeter to instruct her in the Anglican faith that King George believed one day Charlotte, as queen, would defend. The King hoped that these teachers would "render her an honour and comfort to her relations, and a blessing to the dominions over which she may hereafter preside". According to Holme, this instruction made little impression on Charlotte, who chose to learn only what she wanted to learn. Taught by composer Jane Mary Guest, Charlotte became an accomplished pianist.

Caroline's unconventional behaviour led, in 1807, to accusations that she had had sexual relations with other men since the separation. She was caring for a young child, William Austin, who was alleged to be her child by another man. The Prince of Wales hoped that what was termed "the Delicate Investigation" would turn up evidence of adultery that would permit him to get a divorce, and forbade Charlotte to see her mother. Charlotte was aware of the investigation. The ten-year-old was deeply hurt when mother and daughter caught sight of each other in the park, and Caroline, obedient to the Prince's command to have no contact with Charlotte, pretended not to see her. To George's bitter disappointment, the investigating committee found no evidence Caroline had had a second child, though it noted that her behaviour was very much open to misconstruction. The King, who was fond of Caroline, had refused to see her during the investigation, but began to receive her again afterwards. After the conclusion of the Delicate Investigation, the Prince reluctantly allowed Charlotte to see her mother again, with the condition that William Austin not be a playmate.

== Adolescence ==
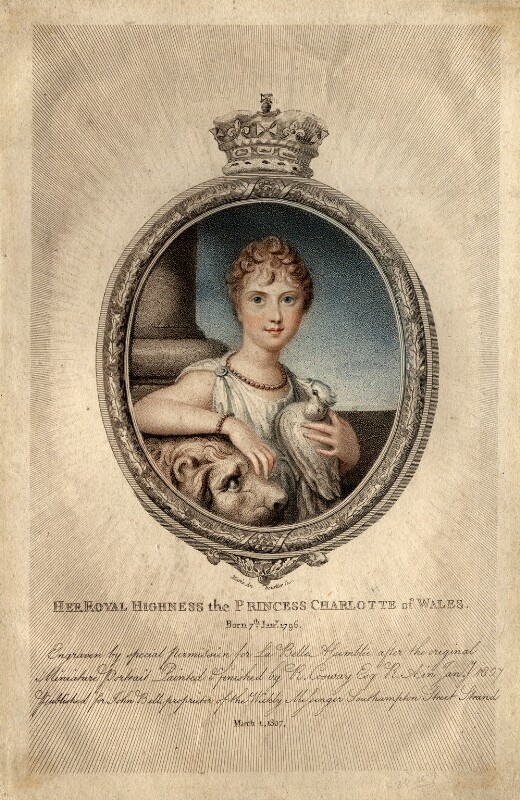
Charlotte in 1807, aged 11

As Charlotte entered her teenage years, members of the Court considered her behaviour undignified. Lady de Clifford complained about Charlotte's allowing her ankle-length underdrawers to show. Lady Charlotte Bury, a lady-in-waiting to Caroline and a diarist whose writings have survived, described Charlotte as a "fine piece of flesh and blood" who had a candid manner and rarely chose to "put on dignity". Her father was proud of her horsemanship. She was fond of music by Mozart and Haydn, and she identified with the character of Marianne in Sense and Sensibility. In 1808 Charlotte Jones was appointed as Charlotte's own official miniature portrait painter.

In late 1810 George III began his final descent into madness. Charlotte and the King were very fond of each other, and she was greatly saddened by his illness. On 6 February 1811, Charlotte's father was sworn in as Prince Regent before the Privy Council, as she rode back and forth in the gardens outside Carlton House, trying to catch glimpses of the ceremony through the ground-floor windows. She was an enthusiastic Whig, as her father had been. However, now that he was exercising the powers of the monarchy, he did not recall the Whigs to office as many had expected him to do. Charlotte was outraged by what she saw as her father's treason, and, at the opera, demonstrated her support by blowing kisses in the direction of the Whig leader, Earl Grey.

George had been raised under strict conditions, which he had rebelled against. Despite this, he attempted to put his daughter, who had the appearance of a grown woman at age 15, under even stricter conditions. He gave her a clothing allowance insufficient for an adult princess, and insisted that if she attended the opera, she was to sit in the rear of the box and leave before the end. With the Prince Regent busy with affairs of state, Charlotte was required to spend most of her time at Windsor with her maiden aunts. Bored, she soon became infatuated with her cousin George FitzClarence, illegitimate son of Prince William, Duke of Clarence. FitzClarence was, shortly thereafter, called to Brighton to join his regiment, and Charlotte's gaze fell on Lieutenant Charles Hesse of the Light Dragoons, reputedly the illegitimate son of her uncle, Prince Frederick, Duke of York and Albany. Hesse and Charlotte had a number of clandestine meetings. Lady de Clifford feared the Prince Regent's rage should they be found out, but Caroline was delighted by her daughter's passion. She did everything that she could to encourage the relationship, even allowing them time alone in a room in her apartments. These meetings ended when Hesse left to join the British forces in Spain. Most of the royal family, except the Prince Regent, were aware of these meetings, but did nothing to interfere, disapproving of the way George was treating his daughter. With the encouragement of his father, Prince Augustus Frederick, Duke of Sussex, his son (and also her cousin) Augustus d'Este also courted Charlotte, but she found his constant attentions a nuisance and asked her uncle to persuade his son to stop pursuing her.

In 1813 with the tide of the Napoleonic Wars having turned firmly in Britain's favour, George began to seriously consider the question of Charlotte's marriage. The Prince Regent and his advisers decided on William, Hereditary Prince of Orange, son and heir-apparent of Prince William VI of Orange. Such a marriage would increase British influence in Northwest Europe. William made a poor impression on Charlotte when she first saw him, at George's birthday party on 12 August, when he became intoxicated, as did the Prince Regent himself and many of the guests. Although no one in authority had spoken to Charlotte about the proposed marriage, she was quite familiar with the plan through palace whispers. Dr. Henry Halford was detailed to sound out Charlotte about the match; he found her reluctant, feeling that a future British queen should not marry a foreigner. Believing that his daughter intended to marry Prince William Frederick, Duke of Gloucester and Edinburgh, the Prince Regent saw his daughter and verbally abused both her and Gloucester. According to Charlotte, "He spoke as if he had the most improper ideas of my inclinations. I see that he is compleatly [sic] poisoned against me, and that he will never come round." She wrote to Earl Grey for advice; he suggested she play for time. The matter soon leaked to the papers, which wondered whether Charlotte would marry "the Orange or the Cheese" (a reference to Gloucester cheese), "Slender Billy" [of Orange] or "Silly Billy". The Prince Regent attempted a gentler approach, but failed to convince Charlotte who wrote that "I could not quit this country, as Queen of England still less" and that if they wed, the Prince of Orange would have to "visit his frogs solo". However, on 12 December, the Prince Regent arranged a meeting between Charlotte and the Prince of Orange at a dinner party, and asked Charlotte for her decision. She stated that she liked what she had seen so far, which George took as an acceptance, and quickly called in the Prince of Orange to inform him.

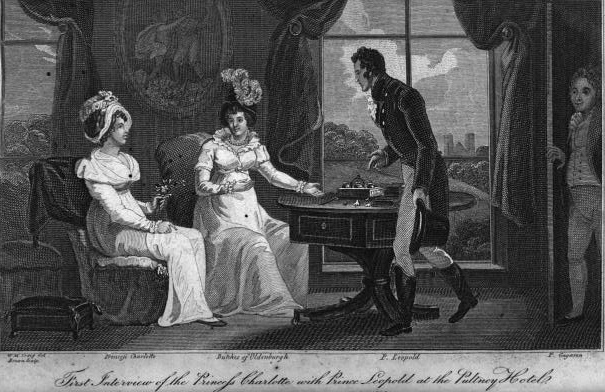
Artist's impression of the first meeting between Princess Charlotte (left) and Prince Leopold (in front of window, with Grand Duchess Catherine Pavlovna of Russia and the Russian Prince Nikolai Gagarin)

Negotiations over the marriage contract took several months, with Charlotte insisting that she not be required to leave Britain. The diplomats had no desire to see the two thrones united, and so the agreement stated that Britain would go to the couple's oldest son, while the second son would inherit the Netherlands; if there was only one son, the Netherlands would pass to the German branch of the House of Orange. Charlotte signed the marriage contract on 10 June 1814. Charlotte had become besotted with a Prussian prince whose identity is uncertain; according to Charles Greville, it was Prince Augustus, although historian Arthur Aspinall disagreed, thinking that her love interest was the younger Prince Frederick. At a party at the Pulteney Hotel in London, Charlotte met a lieutenant-general in the Russian cavalry, Prince Leopold of Saxe-Coburg-Saalfeld. Charlotte invited Leopold to call on her, an invitation he took up, remaining for three quarters of an hour, and writing a letter to the Prince Regent apologising for any indiscretion. This letter impressed George very much, although he did not consider the impoverished Leopold as a possible suitor for his daughter's hand.

The Princess of Wales opposed the match between her daughter and the Prince of Orange, and had great public support: when Charlotte went out in public, crowds would urge her not to abandon her mother by marrying the Prince of Orange. Charlotte informed the Prince of Orange that if they wed, her mother would have to be welcome in their home—a condition sure to be unacceptable to the Prince Regent. When the Prince of Orange would not agree, Charlotte broke off the engagement. Her father's response was to order that Charlotte remain at her residence at Warwick House (adjacent to Carlton House) until she could be conveyed to Cranbourne Lodge at Windsor, where she would be allowed to see no one except the Queen. When told of this, Charlotte raced out into the street. A man, seeing her distress from a window, helped the inexperienced Princess find a hackney cab, in which she was conveyed to her mother's house. Caroline was visiting friends and hastened back to her house, while Charlotte summoned Whig politicians to advise her. A number of family members also gathered, including her uncle, the Duke of York—with a warrant in his pocket to secure her return by force if need be. After lengthy arguments, the Whigs advised her to return to her father's house, which she did the next day.

== Isolation and courtship ==
Charlotte's personal coat of arms, 1816

The story of Charlotte's flight and return was soon the talk of the town; Henry Brougham, a former MP and future Whig Lord Chancellor, reported "All are against the Prince", and the Opposition press made much of the tale of the runaway Princess. Despite an emotional reconciliation with his daughter, the Prince Regent soon had her conveyed to Cranbourne Lodge, where her attendants were under orders never to let her out of their sight. She was able to smuggle a note out to her favourite uncle, Prince Augustus, Duke of Sussex. The Duke responded by questioning the Tory prime minister, Lord Liverpool, in the House of Lords. He asked whether Charlotte was free to come and go, whether she was allowed to go to the seaside as doctors had recommended for her in the past, and now that she was eighteen, whether the government planned to give her a separate establishment. Liverpool evaded the questions, and the Duke was summoned to Carlton House and castigated by the Prince Regent, who never spoke with his brother again.

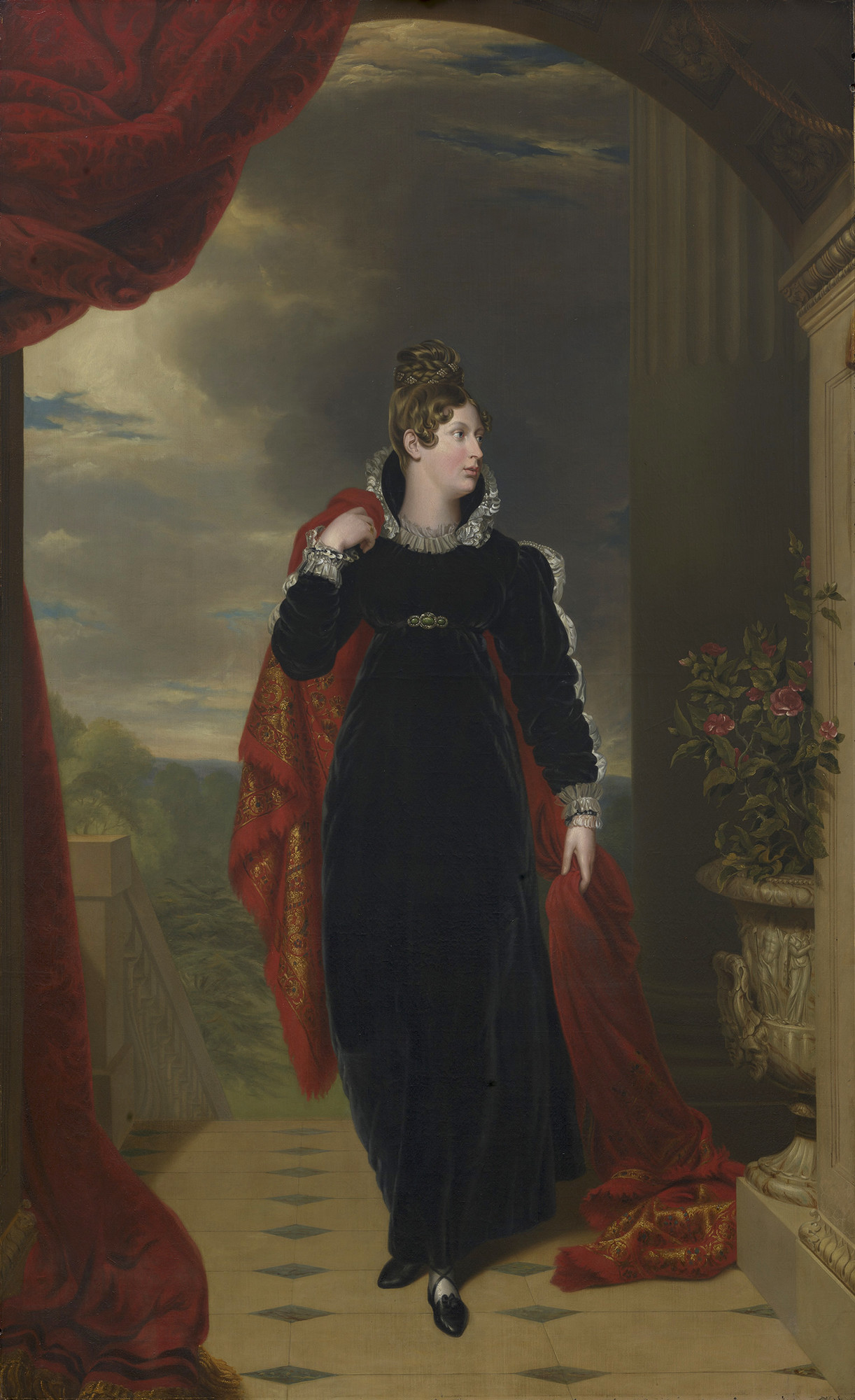
Princess Charlotte, by George Dawe, c. 1816

Despite her isolation, Charlotte found life at Cranbourne Lodge surprisingly agreeable, and slowly became reconciled to her situation. At the end of July 1814, the Prince Regent visited Charlotte in her isolation and informed her that her mother was about to leave England for an extended stay on the Continent. This upset Charlotte, but she did not feel that anything she might say could change her mother's mind, and was further aggrieved by her mother's casualness in the leavetaking, "for God knows how long, or what events may occur before we meet again". Charlotte would never see her mother again. In late August, Charlotte was permitted to go to the seaside. She had asked to go to fashionable Brighton, but the Prince Regent refused, sending her instead to Weymouth. As the princess's coach stopped along the way, large, friendly crowds gathered to see her; according to Holme, "her affectionate welcome shows that already people thought of her as their future Queen". On arrival in Weymouth, there were illuminations with a centrepiece "Hail Princess Charlotte, Europe's Hope and Britain's Glory". Charlotte spent time exploring nearby attractions, shopping for smuggled French silks, and from late September taking a course of heated seawater baths. She was still infatuated with her Prussian, and hoped in vain that he would declare his interest in her to the Prince Regent. If he did not do so, she wrote to a friend, she would "take the next best thing, which was a good tempered man with good sence [sic] ... that man is the P of S-C" [Prince of Saxe-Coburg, i.e. Leopold]. In mid-December, shortly before leaving Weymouth, she "had a very sudden and great shock" when she received news that her Prussian had formed another attachment. In a long talk after Christmas dinner, father and daughter made up their differences.

In the early months of 1815, Charlotte fixed on Leopold (or as she termed him, "the Leo") as a spouse. Her father refused to give up hope that Charlotte would agree to marry the Prince of Orange. However, Charlotte wrote, "No arguments, no threats, shall ever bend me to marry this detested Dutchman." Faced with the united opposition of the royal family, George finally gave in and dropped the idea of marriage to the Prince of Orange, who became engaged to Grand Duchess Anna Pavlovna of Russia that summer. Charlotte contacted Leopold through intermediaries, and found him receptive, but with Napoleon renewing the conflict on the Continent, Leopold was with his regiment fighting. In July, shortly before returning to Weymouth, Charlotte formally requested her father's permission to marry Leopold. The Prince Regent replied that with the unsettled political situation on the Continent, he could not consider such a request. To Charlotte's frustration, Leopold did not come to Britain after the restoration of peace, even though he was stationed in Paris, which she deemed to be only a short journey from Weymouth or London.

In January 1816, the Prince Regent invited his daughter to the Royal Pavilion in Brighton, and she pleaded with him to allow the marriage. On her return to Windsor, she wrote her father, "I no longer hesitate in declaring my partiality in favour of the Prince of Coburg—assuring you that no one will be more steady or consistent in this their present & last engagement than myself." George gave in and summoned Leopold, who was in Berlin en route to Russia, to Britain. Leopold arrived in Britain in late February 1816, and went to Brighton to be interviewed by the Prince Regent. Later, after joining Leopold and her father for dinner, Charlotte wrote:

I find him charming, and go to bed happier than I have ever done yet in my life ... I am certainly a very fortunate creature, & have to bless God. A Princess never, I believe, set out in life (or married) with such prospects of happiness, real domestic ones like other people.

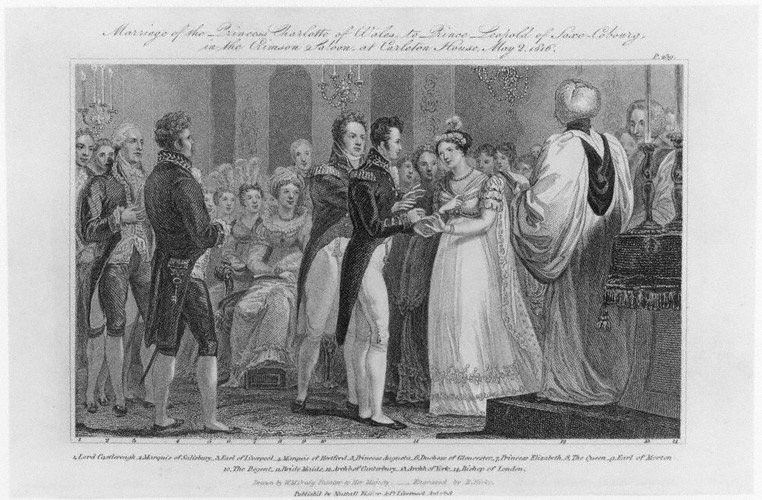
Charlotte and Leopold's wedding

The Prince Regent was impressed by Leopold, and told his daughter that Leopold "had every qualification to make a woman happy". Charlotte was sent back to Cranbourne on 2 March, leaving Leopold with the Prince Regent. On 14 March, an announcement was made in the British House of Commons to great acclaim, with both parties relieved to have the drama of Charlotte's romances at an end. Parliament voted through a bill naturalising Leopold as a British citizen, awarded him £50,000 per year (equivalent to £4.21 million in 2025), purchased Claremont House for the couple, and allowed them a generous single payment to set up house. George also contemplated making Leopold a royal duke, the Duke of Kendal, though the plan was abandoned due to government fears that it would draw Leopold into party politics and suggestions that becoming a 'mere duchess' would be viewed as a demotion for Charlotte. Fearful of a repetition of the Orange fiasco, George limited Charlotte's contact with Leopold; when Charlotte returned to Brighton, he allowed them to meet only at dinner, and never let them be alone together.

The marriage ceremony was set for 2 May 1816. On the wedding day, huge crowds filled London; the wedding participants had great difficulties in travelling. At nine o'clock in the evening in the Crimson Drawing Room at Carlton House, with Leopold dressing for the first time as a British general (the Prince Regent wore the uniform of a field marshal), the couple were married. Charlotte's wedding dress cost over £10,000 (equivalent to £842,830 in 2025). The only mishap was during the ceremony, when Charlotte was heard to giggle when the impoverished Leopold promised to endow her with all his worldly goods.

== Marriage and death ==
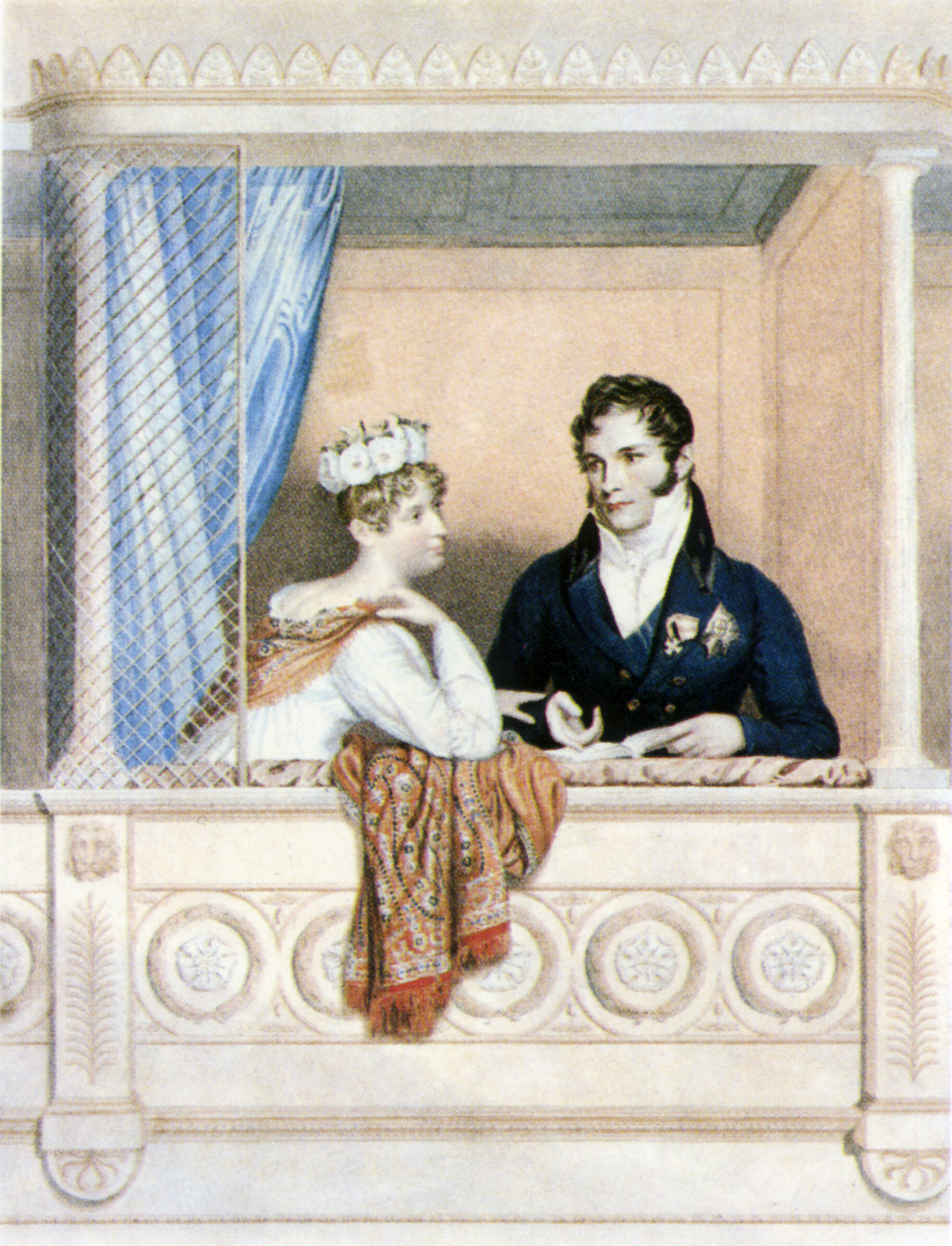
Princess Charlotte and Prince Leopold. Portrait by George Dawe

The couple honeymooned at Oatlands Palace, the Duke of York's residence in Surrey. Neither was well and the house was filled with the Yorks' dogs and the odour of animals. Nevertheless, Charlotte wrote that Leopold was "the perfection of a lover". Two days after the marriage, the Prince Regent visited the couple at Oatlands; he spent two hours describing the details of military uniforms to Leopold, which according to Charlotte "is a great mark of the most perfect good humour". The couple returned to London for the social season, and when they attended the theatre, they were invariably treated to wild applause from the audience and the singing of "God Save the King" from the company. When she was taken ill at the Opera, there was great public concern about her condition. It was announced that she had suffered a miscarriage. On 24 August 1816, they took up residence for the first time at Claremont.

Leopold's physician-in-ordinary, Christian Stockmar (later, as Baron Stockmar, adviser to both Queen Victoria and Prince Albert), wrote that in the first six months of the marriage, he had never seen Charlotte wear anything that was not simple and in good taste. He also noted that she was much more calm and in control of herself than she used to be, and attributed this to Leopold's influence. Leopold wrote later, "Except when I went out to shoot, we were together always, and we could be together, we did not tire." When Charlotte became too excited, Leopold would say only, "Doucement, chérie" ("Gently, dear"). Charlotte both accepted the correction and began calling her husband "Doucement".

The Coburgs, as they came to be called, spent the Christmas holidays at the Brighton Pavilion with various other royals. On 7 January, the Prince Regent gave a huge ball there to celebrate Charlotte's 21st birthday, but the Coburgs did not attend, having returned to Claremont and preferring to remain there quietly. At the end of April 1817, Leopold informed the Prince Regent that Charlotte was again pregnant, and that there was every prospect of her carrying the baby to term.

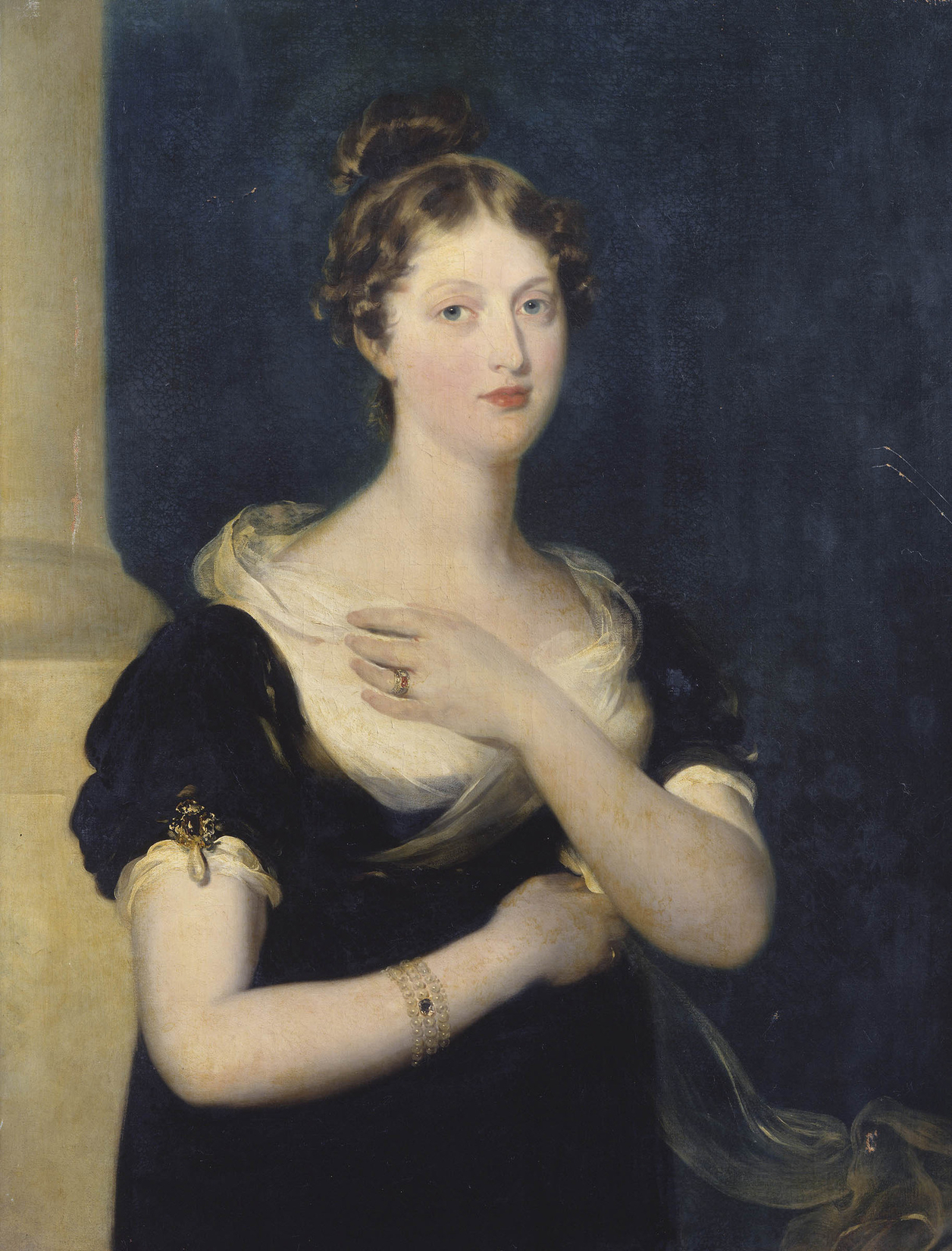
A copy based on Sir Thomas Lawrence's painting of Charlotte, which she sat for in her final days

Charlotte's pregnancy was the subject of the most intense public interest. Betting shops quickly set up book on what sex the child would be. Economists calculated that the birth of a princess would raise the stock market by 2.5%; the birth of a prince would raise it 6%. Charlotte spent her time quietly, spending much time sitting for a portrait by Sir Thomas Lawrence. She ate heavily and got little exercise; when her medical team began prenatal care in August 1817, they put her on a strict diet, hoping to reduce the size of the child at birth. The diet, and occasional bleeding, seemed to weaken Charlotte. Stockmar was amazed at a treatment he saw as outdated, and declined to join the medical team, believing that, as a foreigner, he would be blamed if anything went wrong.

Much of Charlotte's day to day care was undertaken by Sir Richard Croft. Croft was not a physician, but an accoucheur, much in fashion among the well-to-do. Charlotte was believed to be due to deliver on 19 October, but as October ended, she had shown no signs of giving birth, and drove out as usual with Leopold on Sunday 2 November. On the evening of 3 November, her contractions began. Croft encouraged her to exercise, but would not let her eat: late that evening, he sent for the officials who were to witness and attest to the royal birth. As the fourth of November became the fifth, it became clear that Charlotte might be unable to deliver the child, and Croft and Charlotte's personal physician, Matthew Baillie, decided to send for obstetrician John Sims. However, Croft did not allow Sims to see the patient, and obstetrical forceps were not used. Plowden suggests that they might have saved her and the child, though there was a very high mortality rate when instruments were used in the era before antiseptics.

At nine o'clock in the evening of 5 November, Charlotte finally gave birth to a large stillborn boy. Efforts to resuscitate him were in vain, and the noble observers confirmed that it was a handsome boy, resembling the royal family. They were assured that the mother was doing well, and took their leave. An exhausted Charlotte heard the news calmly, stating it was the will of God. She took some nourishment after her lengthy fast and seemed to be recovering. Leopold, who had remained with his wife throughout, apparently took an opiate and collapsed into bed.

Soon after midnight, Charlotte began vomiting violently and complaining of pains in her abdomen. Croft was called, and was alarmed to find his patient cold to the touch, breathing with difficulty, and bleeding. He placed hot compresses on her, the accepted treatment at the time for postpartum bleeding, but the blood did not stop. He called in Stockmar and urged him to bring Leopold. Stockmar found Leopold difficult to rouse, and went to see Charlotte, who grabbed his hand and told him, "They have made me tipsy." Stockmar left the room, planning to try again to rouse Leopold, but was called back by Charlotte's voice, "Stocky! Stocky!" He entered the room to find her dead.

== Aftermath ==
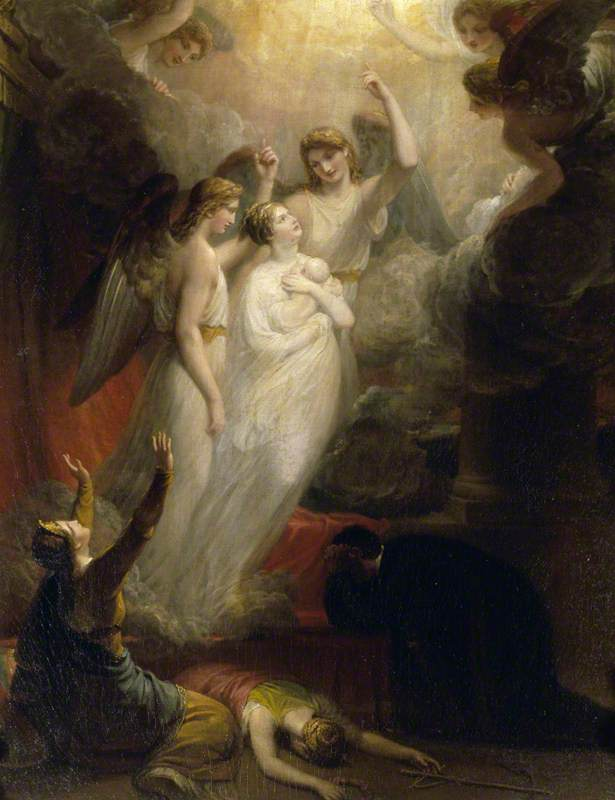
The Apotheosis of Princess Charlotte by Henry Howard, 1818

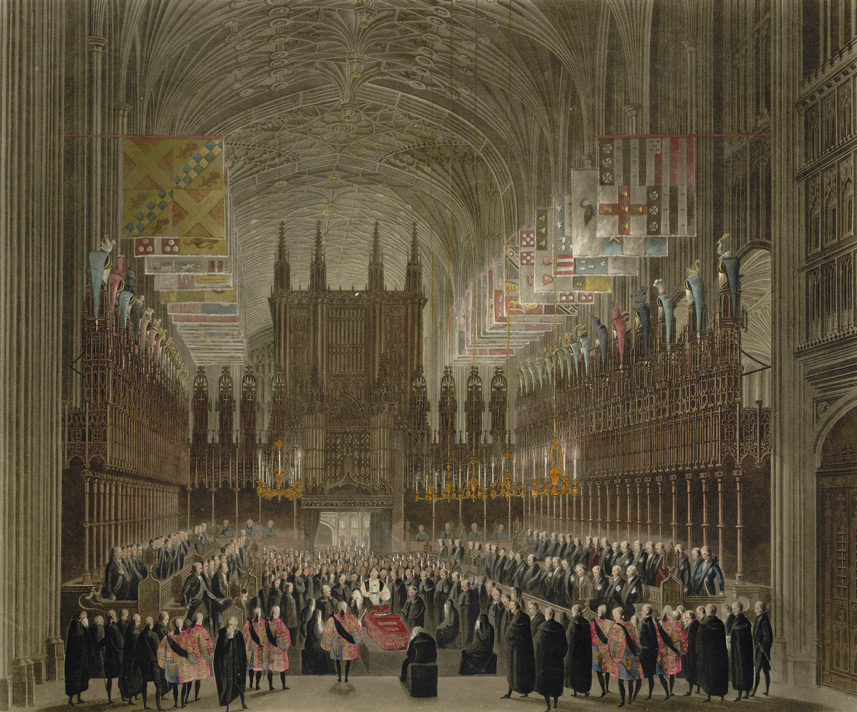
Princess Charlotte's funeral

Henry Brougham, one of the chief advisers to Charlotte's mother, Caroline, wrote of the public reaction to Charlotte's death, "It really was as though every household throughout Great Britain had lost a favourite child." The whole kingdom went into deep mourning; linen-drapers ran out of black cloth. Even the poor and homeless tied armbands of black on their clothes. The shops closed for two weeks, as did the Royal Exchange, the Law Courts, and the docks. Even gambling dens shut down on the day of her funeral, as a mark of respect. Wrote The Times, "It certainly does not belong to us to repine at the visitations of Providence ... there is nothing impious in grieving for that as a calamity." Mourning was so complete that the makers of ribbons and other fancy goods (which could not be worn during the period of mourning) petitioned the government to shorten the period, fearing they would otherwise go bankrupt.

The Prince Regent was prostrate with grief, and was unable to attend his child's funeral. Caroline heard the news from a passing courier, and fainted in shock. On recovering, she stated, "England, that great country, has lost everything in losing my ever beloved daughter." Even the Prince of Orange burst into tears at hearing the news, and his wife ordered the ladies of her court into mourning. The greatest effect fell on Leopold. Stockmar wrote years later, "November saw the ruin of this happy home, and the destruction at one blow of every hope and happiness of Prince Leopold. He has never recovered the feeling of happiness which had blessed his short married life." According to Holme, "without Charlotte he was incomplete. It was as if he had lost his heart." Leopold remained a widower until remarrying in 1832 to Louise of Orleans when he had become King of the Belgians. His youngest daughter, later known as Empress Carlota of Mexico, was named in honour of his lost wife.

Leopold wrote to Sir Thomas Lawrence:

Two generations gone. Gone in a moment! I have felt for myself, but I have also felt for the Prince Regent. My Charlotte is gone from the country—it has lost her. She was a good, she was an admirable woman. None could know my Charlotte as I did know her! It was my study, my duty, to know her character, but it was my delight!

Charlotte was buried, her son at her feet, in St. George's Chapel, Windsor Castle, on 19 November 1817. A monument by the sculptor Matthew Cotes Wyatt was erected, by public subscription, at her tomb. It was not long before the public began to pin blame for the tragedy. Queen Charlotte and the Prince Regent were blamed for not being present at the birth, though the princess had specifically requested that they stay away. Although the post-mortem was inconclusive, many blamed Croft for his care of the princess. The Prince Regent refused to blame Croft; nevertheless, three months after Charlotte's death and while attending another young woman, Croft snatched up a gun and fatally shot himself. The "triple obstetric tragedy"—death of child, mother, and practitioner—led to significant changes in obstetric practice, with obstetricians who favoured intervention in protracted labour, including in particular more liberal use of forceps, gaining ground over those who did not.

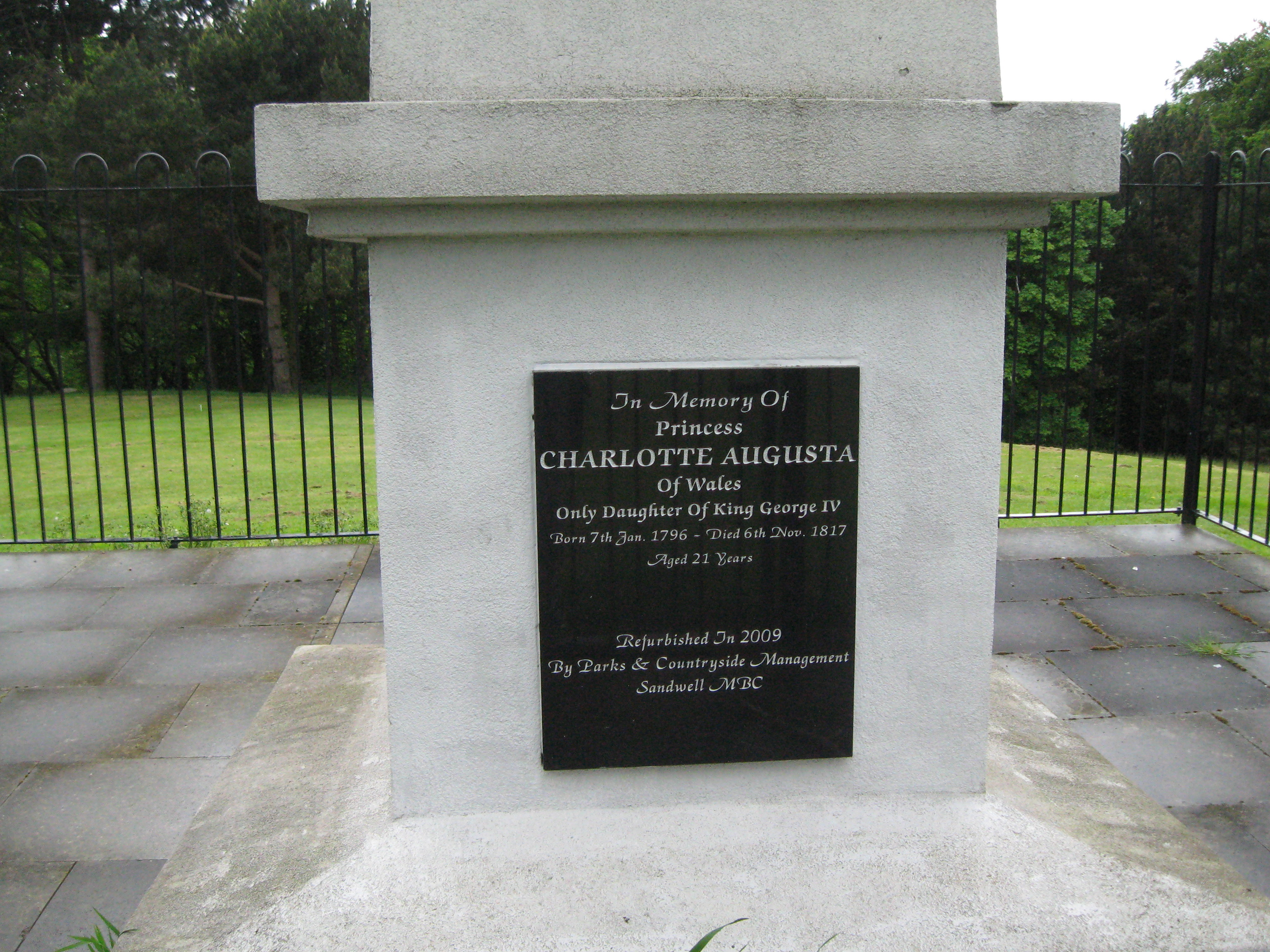
Plaque at the base of the obelisk in Red House Park, Sandwell

An obelisk in memory of Charlotte was erected by the then Liberal MP for Walsall, Robert Wellbeloved Scott, in the grounds of his country house (now Red House Park, in Sandwell). Having become badly damaged through age, the obelisk was restored in August 2009, at cost of £15,000.

Charlotte's death left the King without any legitimate grandchildren; his youngest surviving child was over forty. The newspapers urged the King's unmarried sons towards matrimony. One such leading article reached the King's fourth son, Prince Edward, Duke of Kent and Strathearn, at his home in Brussels, where he was living with his mistress, Julie de St Laurent. Edward quickly dismissed his mistress and proposed to Leopold's sister Victoria, Dowager Princess of Leiningen. They married in May 1818 and their only child was born twelve months later. This daughter, Victoria, became Queen of the United Kingdom in 1837.

== Ancestry ==
Ancestors of Princess Charlotte of Wales

8. Frederick, Prince of Wales
4. George III of the United Kingdom
9. Princess Augusta of Saxe-Gotha
2. George IV of the United Kingdom
10. Duke Charles Louis Frederick of Mecklenburg-Strelitz
5. Princess Charlotte of Mecklenburg-Strelitz
11. Princess Elisabeth Albertine of Saxe-Hildburghausen
1. Princess Charlotte of Wales
12. Charles I, Duke of Brunswick-Wolfenbüttel
6. Charles William Ferdinand, Duke of Brunswick
13. Princess Philippine Charlotte of Prussia
3. Princess Caroline of Brunswick-Wolfenbüttel
14. Frederick, Prince of Wales (= 8)
7. Princess Augusta of Great Britain
15. Princess Augusta of Saxe-Gotha (= 9)

== Bibliography ==
- Aspinall, Arthur (1949). Letters of the Princess Charlotte 1811–1817. London: Home and Van Thal.
- Chambers, James (2007). Charlotte and Leopold. London: Old Street Publishing. ISBN 978-1-905847-23-5.
- Gibbs, Ronald S.; Danforth, David N.; Karlan, Beth Y.; Haney, Arthur F. (2008). Danforth's obstetrics and gynecology. Lippincott Williams & Wilkins. ISBN 978-0-7817-6937-2.
- Holme, Thea (1976). Prinny's Daughter. London: Hamish Hamilton. ISBN 978-0-241-89298-5. OCLC 2357829.
- "No. 13867". The London Gazette. 16 February 1796. p. 176.
- Pakula, Hannah (1997). An Uncommon Woman: The Empress Frederick, daughter of Queen Victoria, wife of the Crown Prince of Prussia, mother of Kaiser Wilhelm. New York: Simon & Schuster. ISBN 978-0-684-84216-5.
- Plowden, Alison (1989). Caroline and Charlotte. London: Sidgwick & Jackson. ISBN 978-0-283-99489-0.
- Raessler, Daniel M. (2004). "Miles (née Guest), Jane Mary (c. 1762–1846)". In Matthew, H.C.G.; Harrison, Brian (eds.). Oxford Dictionary of National Biography. Vol. 38. Oxford University Press. p. 133. ISBN 978-0-19-861388-6.
- Smith, E.A. (2001). George IV. New Haven, Conn.: Yale University Press. ISBN 978-0-300-08802-1.
- Stott, Anne M. (2020). The Lost Queen. Pen & Sword. ISBN 978-1-52673-644-4.
- Williams, Kate (2008). Becoming Queen Victoria. New York: Ballantine Books. ISBN 978-0-345-46195-7.
- McAllen, M. M. (2014). Maximilian and Carlota: Europe's Last Empire in Mexico. San Antonio, Texas: Trinity University Press. ISBN 978-1-595-34185-3. Archived from the original on 24 December 2022.
