= Ratlinghope =

Village in Shropshire, England

Coordinates: 52.566°N 2.883°W

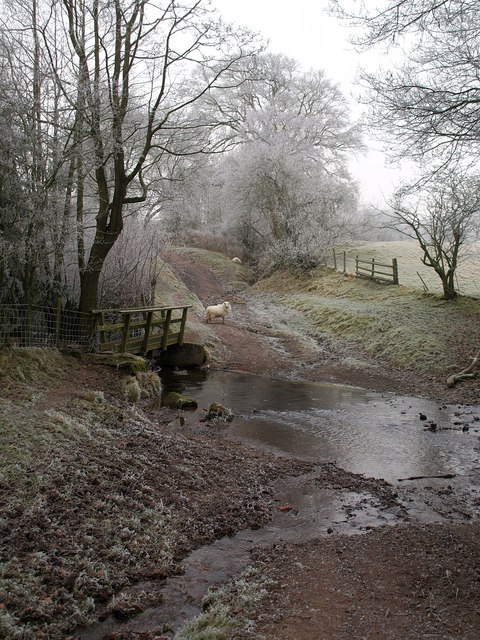
- Ford across the Darnford Brook, Ratlinghope

- Location within Shropshire
- Population: 138 (2011)
- OS grid reference: SO401969
- Civil parish: Ratlinghope
- Unitary authority: Shropshire
- Ceremonial county: Shropshire
- Region: West Midlands
- Country: England
- Sovereign state: United Kingdom
- Post town: SHREWSBURY
- Postcode district: SY5
- Dialling code: 01588
- Police: West Mercia
- Fire: Shropshire
- Ambulance: West Midlands
- UK Parliament: Ludlow

Ratlinghope (/rætlɪŋhoʊp/, locally also /ˈrætʃəp/ RATCH-əp) is a hamlet and civil parish in Shropshire, England. The population of the civil parish at the 2011 census was 138. It is situated four miles (6.4 km) west of Church Stretton and twelve miles (19 km) south of Shrewsbury.

Historically it was located in the hundred of Purslow. In the Church of England it is in the rural deanery of Bishop's Castle, archdeaconry of Ludlow, and diocese of Hereford.

The village is scattered around a valley in the hills of the Long Mynd and Stiperstones, an AONB (area of outstanding natural beauty).

Nearby is the hamlet of Bridges, which falls within Ratlinghope civil parish, and where there is a youth hostel and a public house.

Castle Ring, the earthwork of Ratlinghope Hill, is the fort described by Mary Webb in her novel The Golden Arrow.

== History ==
The area of the parish is 5,456 acres (22.08 km^{2}), of which, at the start of the 20th century, 3,756 acres were arable and pasture, 200 acres woodland, and about 1,500 acres common. The population in 1901 was 197. The land is hilly, and the soil is sand and clay, on a rocky subsoil. An old Roman road, the Portway, runs between Ratlinghope and Church Stretton, and is continued along the crest of the Long Mynd in a north-easterly direction. In the neighbourhood are some British camps (Iron Age hillforts) and tumuli.

Ratlinghope, in Domesday Rotelingehope, means the hope or valley of the people of Rotel, Rotel being the Saxon name from which the County of Rutland's name was derived. At the time of the Domesday survey, Rotelingehope was a manor of two hides, which were waste, and was held by Robert fitz Corbet of Earl Roger de Montgomery. In Edward the Confessor's reign, Seuuard had held it. Robert fitz Corbet was a younger brother of Roger, the builder of Caus Castle; he left two daughters, his heirs, Sibil (or Adela), and Alice. Sibil, who had been one of Henry I's mistresses, married Herbert fitz Herbert, whilst Alice became the wife of William Botterell. Before 1209 Ratlinghope was acquired by Walter Corbet, an Augustine Canon, and a relative of Prince Llewelyn ap Iorwerth, who gave him a letter of protection. Walter Corbet founded here a small cell or priory of Augustinian Canons of St Victor, in connection with Wigmore. Nothing is known of its history, but at the dissolution there was a Prior and 29 Canons; and the possessions of the Priory, valued at £5 11s 1½d per annum, were sold in May 1546 to Robert Longe, a member of the Mercers Guild of the City of London.

In 1845 the manor and advowson of Ratlinghope were purchased by Robert Scott, of Great Barr, MP for Walsall, and at his death in 1856 they passed to his son John Charles Addyes Scott, who died in 1888. On the death of his widow in 1907, their son, James Robert Scott, became lord of the manor and patron of Ratlinghope.

Stitt and Gatten, two miles (3.2 km) north-west, were parts of the Domesday manor of Ratlinghope. Between 1204 and 1210, William de Botterell confirmed a moiety of Stitt on Haughmond Abbey. Robert Corbet, of Caus, also gave to the Canons of Haughmond his culture of Gateden, and an assart near their culture of Gatteden. There was a church at Stitt in the reign of Henry II, but after the dissolution of Haughmond Abbey nothing more is heard of it, and its district with Gatten was annexed to the parish of Ratlinghope. At the start of the 20th century, W. E. M. Hulton-Harrop was lord of the manor of Gatten, which he inherited in 1866 from his maternal grandfather, Jonah Harrop

On 29 January 1865, the Rector of Woolstaston, the Rev. Edmund Donald Carr, was walking from Ratlinghope to a second Sunday evening service at another church when he was caught in a blizzard, lost for 22 hours, snow-blinded and almost died. He emerged in the Cardingmill Valley and must have crossed Wild Moor and Hiddon Hill, some of the wildest country, in his struggle to survive. His account of the ordeal, A Night in the Snow, has become well known in Shropshire.

In 1906, the last known sin-eater in England was buried in Ratlinghope.

== Filming location and music festivals ==
Ratlinghope appears in an episode of Dalziel and Pascoe.

In 2005, the village acquired a further degree of fame when it became the main filming location for the BBC sitcom Green Green Grass.

Between 1980 and 2013, John C. Williams and Frances Williams ran the Music at Leasowes Bank festival featuring both jazz and classical performers.

It also featured on the Paul Heaton Pedals & Pumps Tour of 2010 when he came by bicycle and played the Horseshoe Inn at Bridges.

The village has an annual music festival nearby, usually held in August by a local farmer. Farmer Phil's Festival is run by the family who allow camping before and after the festival ends.

It also has a smaller more eclectic festival that takes place around the Midsummers Soltice (Litha) called the Sin eater although it does not appear to be an annual event – this is a more low key event with Drum workshops and more local bands and is a more laid back affair than Farmer Phil's.

== See also ==
- Listed buildings in Ratlinghope
