= Hymen's war terrific =

1817–19 UK succession scramble

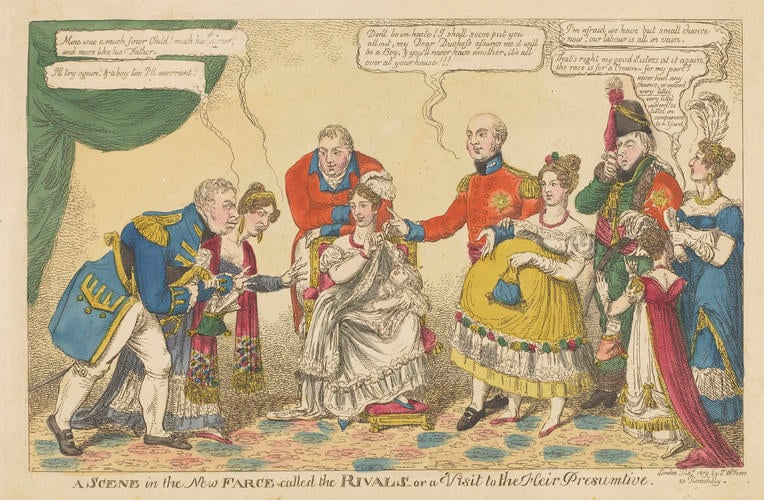
Satirical etching showing the infant Prince George of Cambridge, with his parents at the centre. The Cambridge family is surrounded by various children of King George III, each claiming they will provide the successor.

In 1817, Princess Charlotte of Wales died in childbirth. Charlotte had been the sole legitimate grandchild of King George III, so her death threatened to cause a succession crisis in the United Kingdom. Three of King George's surviving sons then scrambled to marry and produce heirs, in events termed Hymen's war terrific by satirist John Wolcot (in reference to Hymen, the Greek god of marriage ceremonies). Several potential heirs were born in 1819, including the future Queen Victoria.

== Precipitating death ==
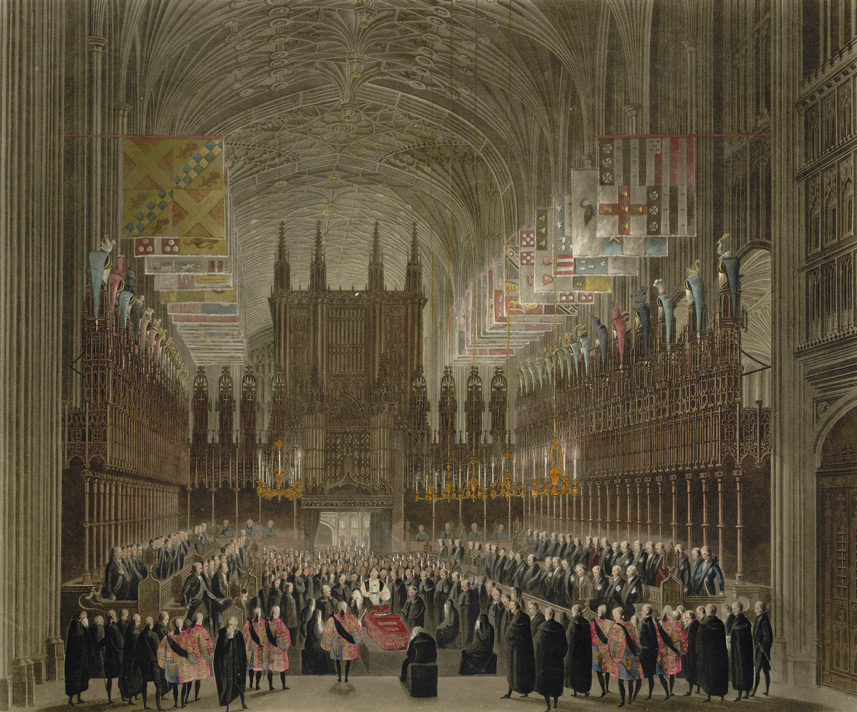
Princess Charlotte's funeral

King George III and Queen Charlotte had 15 children, 12 of whom were still living in 1817. The king had gone insane and blind by 1817; his powers were exercised by his eldest son and heir apparent, George, Prince of Wales, as regent. The king's sons were widely unpopular because of their dissolute lifestyles; the Duke of Wellington called them "the damnest millstones about the neck of any government that can be imagined", while the poet Percy Bysshe Shelley described them as "the dross of their dull race". For over 20 years, the king had only one legitimate grandchild, Princess Charlotte of Wales, who was the only member of the royal family to enjoy public support. She had miscarried twice early in her marriage with Prince Leopold of Saxe-Coburg-Saalfeld, but still expected to have a family of her own. On the evening of 5 November, she delivered a stillborn son and died early in the morning.

The queen and her third son Prince William, Duke of Clarence and St Andrews, were in Bath for a civic reception and an evening banquet in their honour. A messenger brought word that Princess Charlotte's child had been born dead, though the princess herself was expected to recover, and the banquet proceeded. As the meal was ending, a page brought Sir Henry Halford a letter with the news of the princess's death that Halford immediately passed to the duke. After reading it, the duke struck his forehead and left the room in distress. The deaths were seen as a national tragedy.

== Princes ==
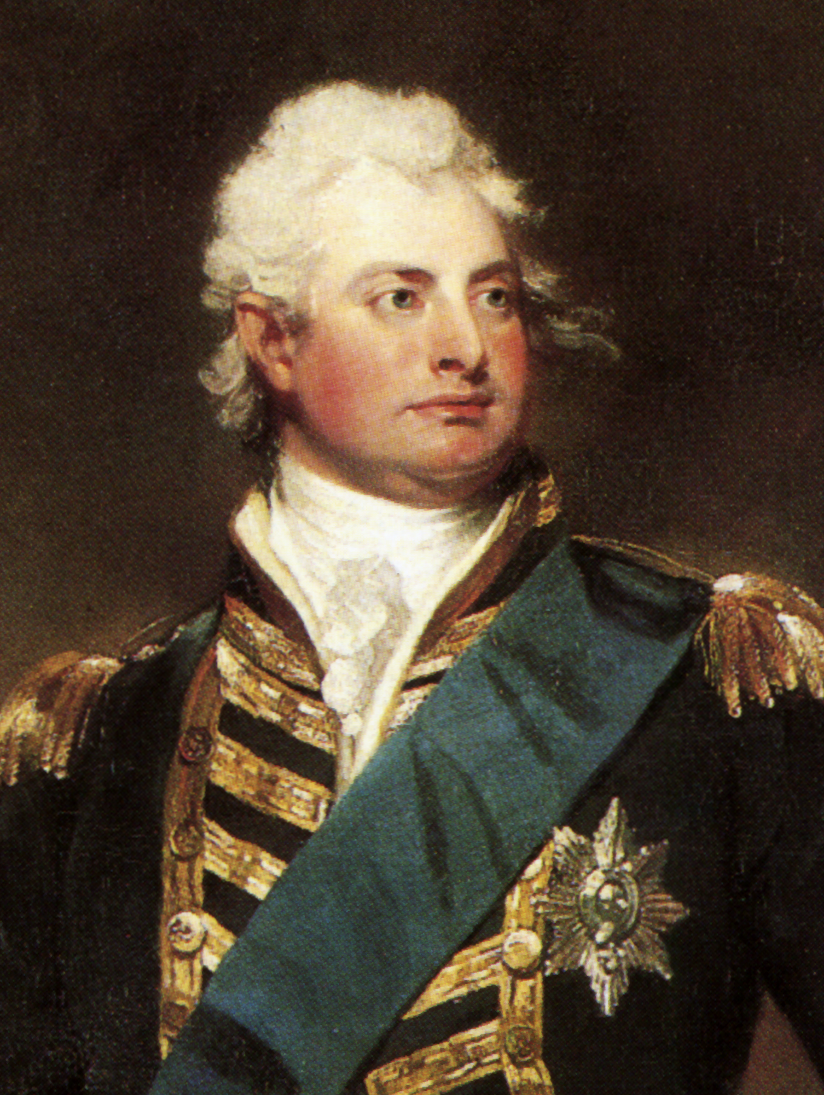
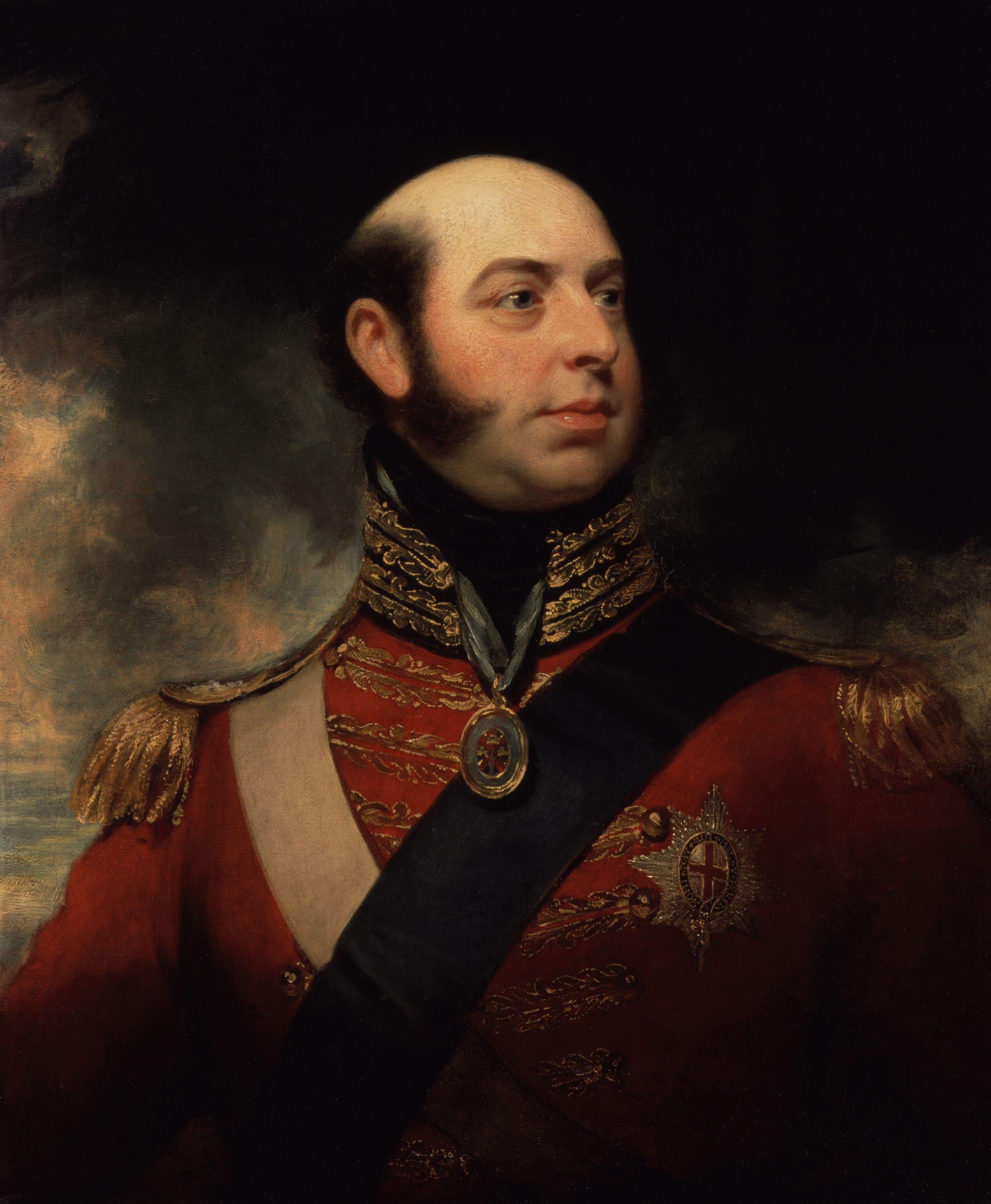
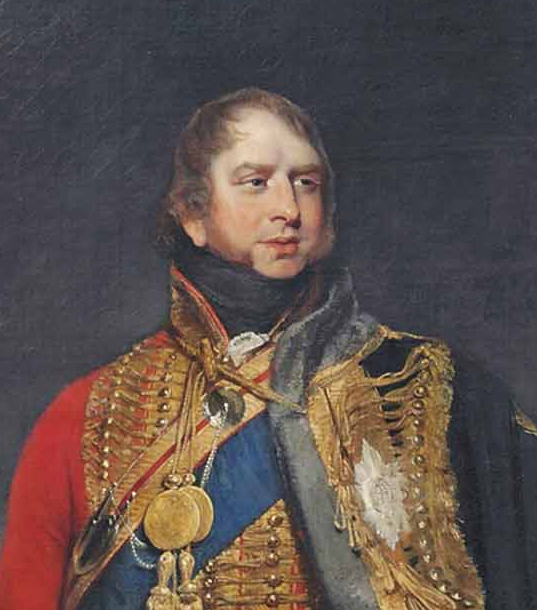
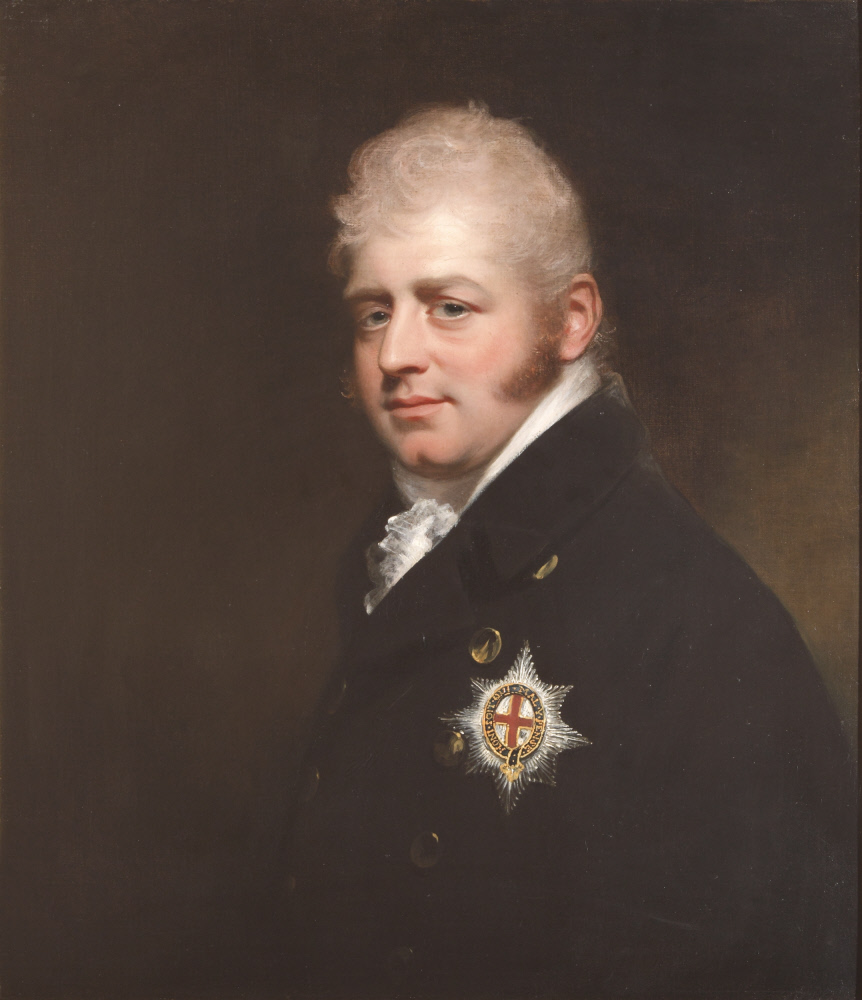
After the death of Princess Charlotte of Wales, four royal dukes came under pressure to produce heirs: Clarence (upper left), Kent (upper right), Cumberland (lower left), and Cambridge (lower right).

At the time of Princess Charlotte's death, almost none of King George's sons (her uncles) appeared likely to have legitimate children. The king's five daughters were all childless and past childbearing age. Hope rested on the middle sons, who had remained unmarried because their partners would not have been acceptable consorts.

1. George, Prince of Wales (aged 55), King George's eldest son and Princess Charlotte's father, was estranged from his wife, Princess Caroline of Brunswick.
2. Prince Frederick, Duke of York and Albany (aged 54), was childless and also estranged from his wife, Frederica of Prussia.
3. Prince William, Duke of Clarence and St Andrews (aged 52), had 10 children with his long-time domestic partner, Dorothea Jordan. Parliament declared that they would only increase his allowance if he married, and his initial attempts to find a wife were not successful. The prince of Wales, who served as regent on behalf of the king, and the Government refused William's petitions to marry wealthy heiresses Catherine Tylney-Long and Sophia Wykeham.
4. Prince Edward, Duke of Kent and Strathearn (aged 50), was also in an unmarried union; for almost 30 years his companion was Julie de Saint-Laurent. Their union produced no children.
5. Prince Ernest August, Duke of Cumberland and Teviotdale (aged 46), had married the widowed Princess Frederica of Mecklenburg-Strelitz, a mother of nine children by two previous marriages, but by November 1817 had only had a stillborn daughter.
6. Prince Augustus Frederick, Duke of Sussex (aged 44), had married in contravention of the Royal Marriages Act 1772 and his children were thus not eligible to succeed to the throne.
7. Prince Adolphus, Duke of Cambridge (aged 43), was unmarried.

== Race ==
=== Search for wives ===
Agog are all, both old and young
Warm'd with desire to be prolific
And prompt with resolution strong
to fight in Hymen's war terrific. — John Wolcot

Immediately after Charlotte's death, the royal family and the government started searching through the royal and ducal houses of Europe for eligible princesses for Clarence, Kent, and Cambridge. At the time, it was most unlikely that Clarence's elder brothers would remarry and thus impossible for them to produce an heir, making it likely that Clarence would become king of both the United Kingdom and Hanover.

Clarence accepted that he would have to go along with whatever plans were arranged for him, but only on certain conditions. In December he informed his mother, Queen Charlotte, that if the cabinet wanted him to marry someone of standing, he first needed to know what funds would support his household. With several children dependent on him and substantial debts with accruing interest, he could not contemplate marriage without clear terms for a financial settlement. The prime minister, Lord Liverpool, then suggested increasing the duke's parliamentary grant from £18,000 to £40,000 a year, supplying £22,000 for his marriage expenses, and wiping out £17,000 of his debts.

Princess Marie of Hesse-Kassel and a Danish princess were considered as brides for Clarence, but no betrothal was agreed. In November, Clarence informed the prince regent that he was ready to depart for Germany with hopes of marrying the 18-year-old Princess Augusta of Hesse-Kassel. Cambridge, recently appointed viceroy of the Kingdom of Hanover, also started searching for a bride in late 1817. He sent to England a description of Princess Augusta and confided in a friend his belief that she would make an ideal queen; he believed that he had a duty to the nation and his brother to allow him "the first opportunity of making his advances". Clarence was first bewildered and then amused, declaring that Cambridge was in love with the princess himself. Her father, Prince Frederick of Hesse-Kassel, declined the suit on account of Clarence's advanced age and numerous illegitimate children. Clarence approved of Cambridge marrying Augusta, and their wedding was held in May or on 1 June 1818. Cambridge thus became the first of the unmarried brothers to wed.

By March 1818, a duchess of Clarence was found in the person of the 25-year-old Princess Adelaide of Saxe-Meiningen. The government went back on their promise and reduced Clarence's funds to £6,000 after George Canning, president of the Board of Control, argued that Clarence would have never considered this marriage had it not been forced on him as a public duty. The duke then indignantly refused the marriage, but Adelaide refused to give up on the prospect and he was made to reconsider.

=== Weddings and births ===
A double wedding was held at Kew Palace in July 1818: the Duke of Clarence married Adelaide and his younger brother the duke of Kent married the 31-year-old Princess Victoria of Saxe-Coburg-Saalfeld. The wedding drew a select group of royal guests: the duke of York, the newly married duke and duchess of Cambridge, the Duke and Duchess of Gloucester, Princess Sophia of Gloucester, the Duchess of Saxe-Meiningen, and Prince Frederick of Hesse-Kassel. Political figures were limited to Lord Liverpool, the prime minister; Lord Eldon, the lord chancellor; and Lord Sidmouth, the home secretary. The Archbishop of Canterbury, Charles Manners-Sutton, and the Bishop of London, William Howley, represented the clergy. Adelaide wore a silver tissue gown trimmed with Brussels lace and silver tassels, fastened with a diamond clasp, and wore a diamond wreath in her hair. Victoria was dressed in gold tissue. The Prince of Wales gave both brides away. Afterward they knelt to be blessed by Queen Charlotte. She soon withdrew to her boudoir, leaving the remaining family members to a large dinner hosted by the prince of Wales, featuring turtle and other soups, fish, venison, and a variety of fruit for dessert.

The double wedding marked the beginning of the race to sire an heir. The Cumberlands had another stillborn daughter. The Clarences left England to live a more modest life in Hanover, the duke having refused the reduced allowance offered to him. The duchess became pregnant, and the duke wanted the child to be born in England, but she was not thought healthy enough to undergo the journey. In the space of a week in March 1819, two legitimate grandchildren were born to George III in Hanover: Princess Charlotte of Clarence and Prince George of Cambridge. Clarence's daughter was premature and lived only a few hours, leaving Cambridge's son as the king's sole legitimate grandchild. Prince George's chances of succeeding to the throne were dashed in May, when Cambridge's elder brothers became fathers: Princess Alexandrina Victoria of Kent was born at Kensington Palace on 24 May, followed by Prince George of Cumberland three days later in Berlin. Princess Victoria was born fifth in the line of succession, but had become third by January 1820: the Duke of Kent died of a cold on 23 January, followed six days later by the king.

Clarence, second in line after York, still hoped to secure the succession for his own line, but his wife's subsequent three pregnancies resulted in stillbirths and the short-lived Princess Elizabeth of Clarence (1820–1821). York died in 1827, promoting Victoria to second in line to the throne, despite being the daughter of a fourth son, and not even the eldest of King George III's four surviving legitimate grandchildren. Being female, she was barred from succeeding to the throne of Hanover. When King William IV, as Clarence was known following his brother, King George IV's death, died on 20 June 1837, she succeeded to the British throne, while Cumberland became king of Hanover.
