= Red House Park =

Public park in Great Barr, Sandwell, England

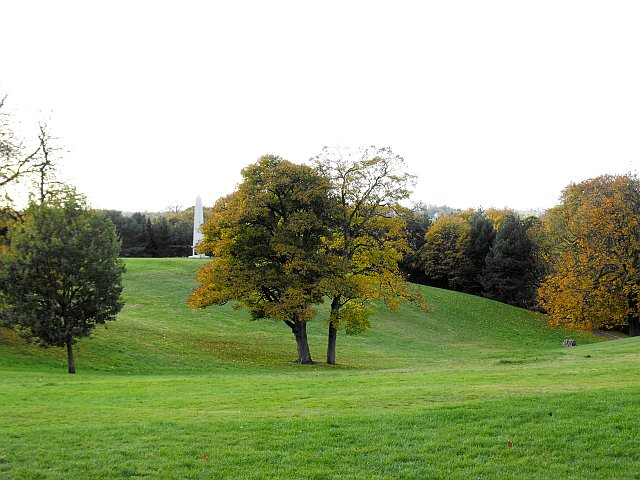
- View across the park, with the Princess Charlotte memorial obelisk in the distance
- Interactive map of Red House Park
- Location: West Bromwich
- Coordinates: 52.547026°N 1.941555°W
- Owner: Sandwell Metropolitan Borough Council

Red House Park is a public park in Great Barr, West Bromwich, England. It is named after the country house in whose grounds it was established. The park features two lakes, and an obelisk in memory of Princess Charlotte. It is managed by Sandwell Metropolitan Borough Council.

== The Red House ==
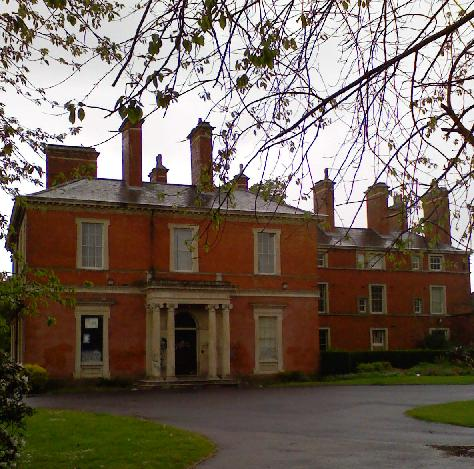
The Red House pictured in 2007.

Within the park is The Red House, a country house built in the 1841 for the then Liberal MP for Walsall, Robert Wellbeloved Scott, and stood in his 27-acre (11 ha) estate. Since 17 June 1996 it has been a Grade II listed building, statutory list reference: 5/110011 (179). It uses red bricks in Flemish bond with stone dressings. It has a hipped roof with Welsh slates and brick chimneys.

Previously used as a convalescent home, the house was subsequently owned by Sandwell Metropolitan Borough Council and for a while was leased to the British Trust for Conservation Volunteers. In 2015, it was sold to a developer for conversion into apartments.

== Obelisk ==
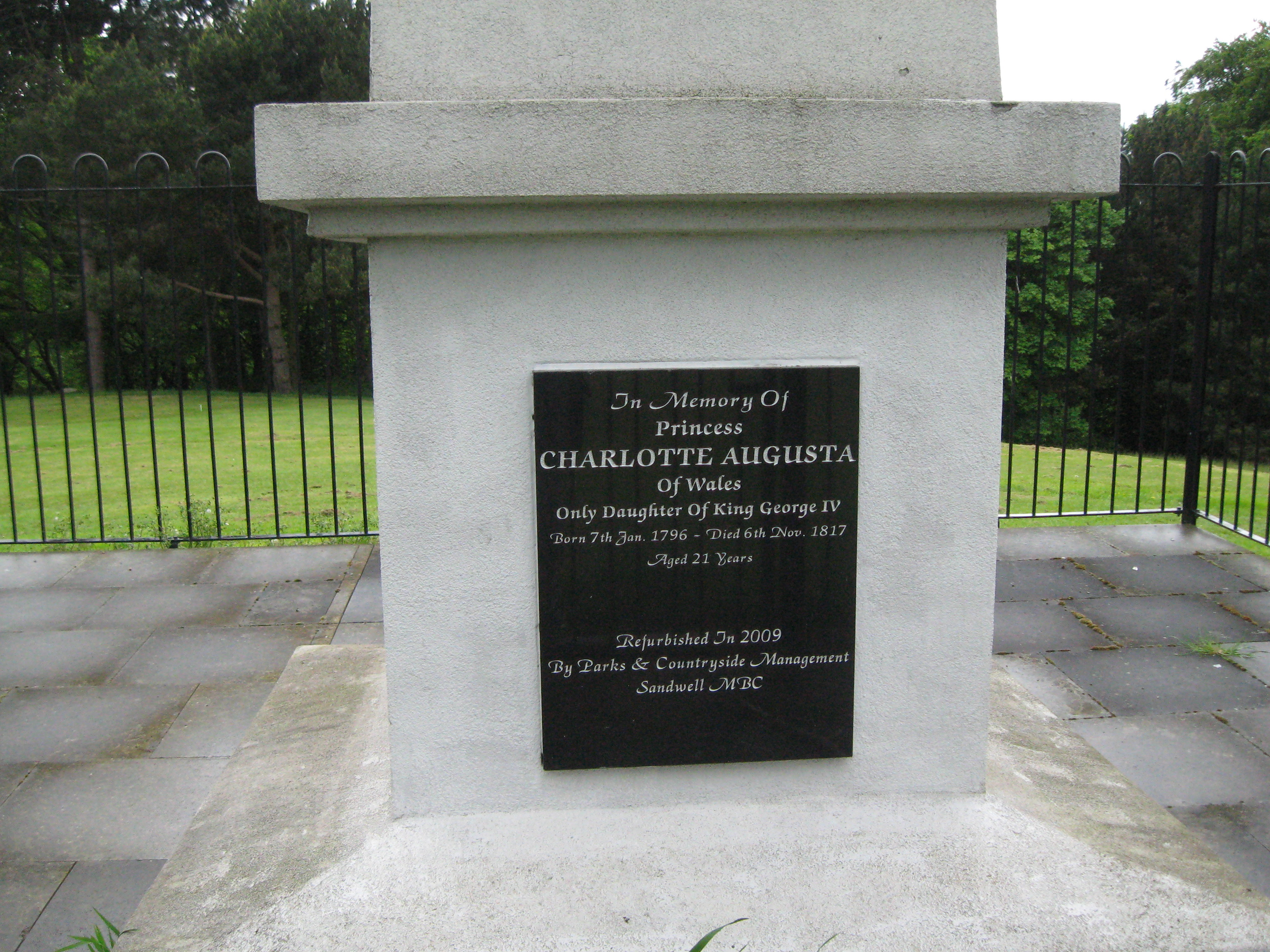
Plaque at the base of the obelisk

The park includes an obelisk, in memory of Princess Charlotte. Having become badly damaged through age, it was restored in August 2009, at cost of £15,000.

== Cave ==
The Park is also home to two small tunnel like structures known locally, and referred to on maps as, Hermit's Cave.
