= Listed buildings in Ratlinghope =

Ratlinghope is a civil parish in Shropshire, England. It contains eight listed buildings that are recorded in the National Heritage List for England. All the listed buildings are designated at Grade II, the lowest of the three grades, which is applied to "buildings of national importance and special interest". The parish contains the village of Ratlinghope and smaller settlements and is otherwise rural. The listed buildings are varied, and consist of a former manor house, a smaller house, a farmhouse, a church, a public house, a milestone, a former coach house and a former smithy.

== Buildings ==
Name and location	Photograph	Date	Notes
The Manor House; 52.56407°N 2.88415°W	—	c. 1600	The former manor house was remodelled and extended in 1761. It is roughcast over limestone and quartzite, and has slate roofs. There are two storeys and an attic, and a T-shaped plan, with a long main range. The windows are casements, and the doorway has a plain surround.
St Margaret's Church; 52.56657°N 2.88260°W		Early 17th century	The church was altered in 1788 and in 1904–05. It is in stone with a slate roof, and consists of a nave and a chancel in one cell, a south porch, and a northwest vestry. At the west end is a bellcote with weatherboarding, a pyramidal cap and a weathervane.
Coates Farmhouse; 52.55315°N 2.89683°W	—	17th century or earlier	The farmhouse is in limestone, pebbledashed on the front, with some brick at the rear, and it has an asbestos slate roof. There are two storeys, five bays, and three outshuts at the rear. Most of the windows date from the 20th century, and there are two doorways.
Little Overs; 52.56067°N 2.89763°W	—	Late 17th century	The house, which was considerably altered in the 19th century, is timber framed with plaster infill on a stone plinth and has a slate roof. The timber framing has been partly replaced in stone, roughcast in places, and partly in red brick. There are two storeys and three bays. The windows are casements with Gothic glazing.
Horse Shoe Inn; 52.56246°N 2.89624°W		Late 18th century (probable)	A house, later a public house, it was extended in the 19th century. It has a timber framed core with brick infill, and is roughcast, the extension is in stone, and the roof is slated. There are two storeys and four bays. The doorway has a plain surround, and the windows are casements with Gothic glazing.
Milestone near the Old School House; 52.57579°N 2.88567°W		Mid to late 19th century	The milestone is on the southeast side of the road, and has a rounded top. It is inscribed with "MILES" and the distances to Bishop's Castle and to Shrewsbury.
Former coach house, Horse Shoe Inn; 52.56233°N 2.89641°W		Late 19th century	The coach house, later used for other purposes, it is in stone, with the front wall and dressings in brick, and a slate roof. On the front are double doors, and a tall single door above. The windows have Gothic glazing.
Old Smithy; 52.56261°N 2.89617°W		Late 19th century	The former smithy is in stone with red brick dressings and a slate roof. It has an L-shaped plan, and contains double doors and a hatch.
