= Jane Mary Guest =

English composer and pianist

Jane Mary Guest, also known as Jenny Guest and later as Jane Mary Miles, (c. 1762 – 20 March 1846) was an English composer and pianist. A pupil of Johann Christian Bach, and initially composing in the galante style, she composed keyboard sonatas, other keyboard works and vocal works with keyboard accompaniment. She was piano teacher to Princess Amelia and Princess Charlotte of Wales.

== Biography ==
Guest was born c. 1762, probably in Bath, Somerset, where her father Thomas Guest was a tailor. At Bath her teachers included Thomas Orpin and Thomas Linley, and she was giving performances there by the age of 6. From 1776 she was a pupil of J. C. Bach in London, and she was also taught by Antonio Sacchini. She performed in London from 1779, giving subscription concerts there in 1783–84. She was known for her expressive style of playing. Around this time she published her Six Sonatas, Op. 1, which gained extensive subscriptions, including from royalty, and which were also published in Paris in 1784 and Berlin in 1785.

On 29 August 1789 she married Abram or Abraham Allen Miles, an accountant, in London. During the 1790s she taught and gave performances in Bath, including at concerts directed there by Venanzio Rauzzini, who was another of her teachers. One of the concerts was a private concert for Joseph Haydn in which she improvised on a theme of Haydn’s. She also wrote some unpublished concertos which do not seem to have survived.

In 1804 she became the piano tutor of Princess Amelia, the youngest daughter of George III, and in 1806 to the Prince Regent's daughter Princess Charlotte of Wales. However Amelia died in 1810 after years of illness, while all of Charlotte's staff were fired in 1814 by her father. Guest remained Charlotte's tutor at least until that time.

Her husband Abram died in 1832 and she died on 20 March 1846 in Blackheath, London, where she had been living with her daughter Louisa. She was buried with her husband at the church of St Edmund, King and Martyr. The popularity of some of her works continued, with republication of "The Fairies' Dance" in 1863 and "The Bonnie Wee Wife" in 1874.

== Works ==
=== Keyboard sonatas ===
- Six Sonatas, Op. 1 (?1783), with violin/flute accompaniment
- Sonata (1807), with violin accompaniment

=== Other keyboard works ===
- Introduction and March from Rossini's Ricciardo e Zoraide (?1820)
- La Georgiana: Introduction and Waltz (1826)
- La jolie Julienne: Polacca (1826)
- La Jeanette: Introduction and Original Air (1828)
- Divertimento (1829)

=== Vocal with keyboard accompaniment ===
- "Marion, or Will Ye Gang to the Burn Side" (?1820), ballad
- "The Bonnie Wee Wife" (1823), ballad, text by Robert Burns
- "Brignal Banks" (1825), glee, text by Walter Scott
- "Jessica" (?1825), ballad
- "Come Buy My Garlands Gay" (1826), ballad
- "Di te non mi fido" (1827), duet
- "The Fairies' Dance" (1829), duet
- "Dalton Hall" (?1830), ballad
- "Fair One, Take This Rose" (?1830)
- "The Bonnie Lassie" (?1830), text by Robert Burns
- "Yes! I'll Gang to the Eure Bughts" (c. 1830)
- "The Field Daisy" (1842)
