= Robert Wellbeloved Scott =

Robert Wellbeloved Scott, born Robert Wellbeloved (15 July 1803 – 21 February 1856) was the Liberal Member of Parliament (MP) for Walsall, England from 1841 to 1847.

He was born to the Revd Charles Wellbeloved and Ann née Kinder (d. 31 January 1823) and trained as a barrister. On 17 February 1830 he married Sarah Scott, the only daughter and heiress of John Scott of Stourbridge and the Red House, Great Barr, Staffordshire and on her father's death in 1832 assumed the additional surname of Scott. He was a Deputy Lieutenant for Worcestershire.

He rebuilt The Red House at Great Barr, England in 1841 and had residences at Cambridge Gate, Regent's Park, London; and High Street, Stourbridge. In 1845 he purchased the manor and estates of Ratlinghope, between the Long Mynd and the Stiperstones in Shropshire.

His sister Emma (d. 29 July 1842) married Sir James Carter in 1831.

He died in 1856 aged 52. He and his wife had one son, John Charles Addyes Scott and three daughters.

Parliament of the United Kingdom
Preceded by John Neilson Gladstone	Member of Parliament for Walsall; 1841–1847	Succeeded by Edward Littleton
