= Unton =

Unton is a surname occasionally as a first name most commonly found in the United States, Poland, Russia, United Kingdom and Belarus.

People with the surname Unton are;

- Edward Unton (high sheriff) (1534–1582), English politician and high sheriff
- Edward Unton (captain) (c. 1556–1589), English landowner and MP
- Sir Henry Unton (c. 1557–1596), Elizabethan English diplomat
- Henry Unton (MP) (c. 1535–1555 or later), English politician and high sheriff
- Tomasz Unton (born 1970), Polish footballer and manager

People with the first name Unton are;

- Unton Croke (1593–1671), English judge and politician
