= Edward Unton =

Edward Unton may refer to:

- Edward Unton (high sheriff) (1534–1582), English politician and high sheriff
- Edward Unton (captain) (c. 1556–1589), English landowner and MP
