= William Barrington, 6th Viscount Barrington =

British businessman and politician

The Right Honourable The Viscount Barrington
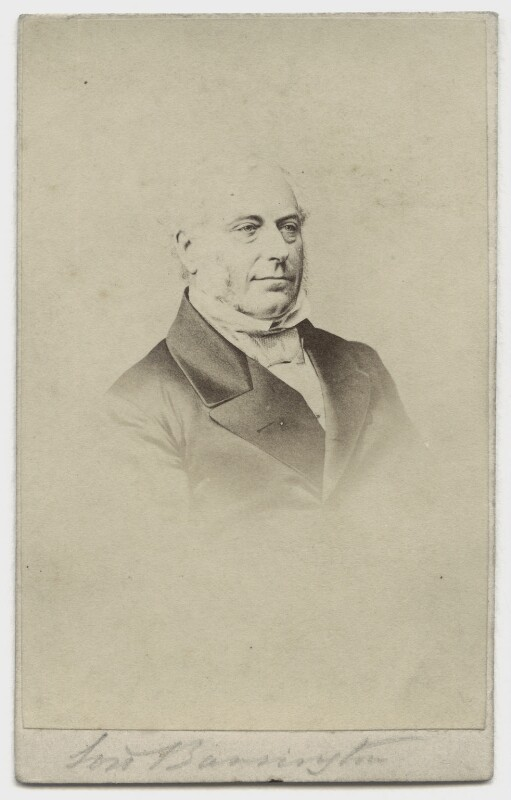

Member of Parliament for Berkshire
- In office 1837–1857
- Preceded by: Robert Palmer; John Walter; Philip Pusey
- Succeeded by: Robert Palmer; George Henry Vansittart; Hon. Philip Pleydell-Bouverie

Personal details
- Born: 6 October 1793 London, England
- Died: 9 February 1867 (aged 73)
- Spouse: Hon. Jane Elizabeth Liddell (m. 1823)
- Relations: John Barrington (grandfather)
- Parent(s): George Barrington, 5th Viscount Barrington; Elizabeth Adair
- Education: Westminster School
- Alma mater: Christ Church, Oxford

William Keppel Barrington, 6th Viscount Barrington (6 October 1793 – 9 February 1867), styled The Honourable from 1814 until 1829, was a British businessman and politician.

== Early life ==
Born in London on 6 October 1793, Barrington was the eldest son of fifteen children born to the Reverend George Barrington, 5th Viscount Barrington, by his wife Elizabeth, second daughter of Robert Adair and Lady Caroline Keppel (the second daughter of Willem van Keppel, 2nd Earl of Albemarle), a descendant of Charles Lennox, 1st Duke of Richmond.

Like his father, he was educated at Westminster School and Christ Church, Oxford, where he graduated with a Bachelor of Arts in 1814.

== Career ==
Barrington succeeded in the viscountcy on the death of his father in 1829. However, as this was a title in the Peerage of Ireland, it did not entitle him to a seat in the House of Lords. In 1837 he was instead elected to the House of Commons as one of three representatives for Berkshire, a seat he held until 1857. He was also Chairman of the Great Western Railway between 1856 and 1857.

== Personal life ==
On 21 April 1823, Lord Barrington married the Hon. Jane Elizabeth Liddell (1804–1883), fourth daughter of Thomas Liddell, 1st Baron Ravensworth and the former Maria Susannah Simpson (daughter and co-heiress of John Simpson of Bradley Hall and Lady Anne Lyon, the second daughter of Thomas Lyon, 8th Earl of Strathmore and Kinghorne). His wife served as a Lady of the Bedchamber to the Dowager Queen Adelaide. They lived at Beckett Hall, Shrivenham, Berkshire which he had built in 1830–1831.

They were the parents of five sons and five daughters:

- George William Barrington, 7th Viscount Barrington (1824–1886), who married Isabel Elizabeth Morritt, daughter and heiress of John Morritt of Rokeby Park.
- Percy Barrington, 8th Viscount Barrington (1825–1901), who married Louisa Higgins, daughter of Tully Higgins.
- Hon. Charlotte Maria Barrington (c. 1826–1854), who married her third cousin Thomas Lyon-Bowes, 12th Earl of Strathmore and Kinghorne, in 1850.
- Hon. Mary Frances Barrington (d. 1913), who married Alfred Urban Sartoris of Abbotswood House in Lower Swell, in 1856.
- Hon. Caroline Susan Augusta Barrington (1834–1915), who married James Agar, 3rd Earl of Normanton in 1856.
- Hon. Augusta Anne Barrington (1836–1915), who married the Rt. Hon. and Most Rev. William Dalrymple Maclagan, Archbishop of York, in 1878.
- Hon. Sir William Augustus Curzon Barrington (1842–1922), a diplomat.
- Hon. Sir Bernard Eric Edward Barrington (1847–1918), a civil servant who married Christina Graham, daughter of William Graham.
- Hon. Adelaide Barrington (d. 1862), who married, as his first wife, Charles Balfour, second son of James Balfour and Lady Eleanor Maitland (a daughter of James Maitland, 8th Earl of Lauderdale) in 1860.

Lord Barrington died at Shrivenham in February 1867, aged 73, and was succeeded in the viscountcy by his eldest son, George. He was buried in St. Andrews Church, Shrivenham. Lady Barrington died 22 March 1883, aged 78.

=== Descendants ===
Through his eldest son, he was a grandfather of three girls: Hon. Constance Mary Barrington (1847–1926), who married Lawrence Palk, 2nd Baron Haldon, Hon. Evelyn Laura Barrington (1848–1924), who married George Craven, 3rd Earl of Craven, and Hon. Florence Isabel Barrington, a Sister of the Community of St Mary the Virgin.

Through his daughter Adelaide, he was a grandfather of Charles Barrington Balfour (a first cousin of Arthur Balfour, who served as Prime Minister from 1902 to 1905), an army officer and MP for Hornsey who later served as the Lord Lieutenant of Berwickshire. He married Lady Helena McDonnell, daughter of Alexander MacDonnell, 5th Earl of Antrim.

Parliament of the United Kingdom
Preceded by Robert Palmer; John Walter; Philip Pusey	Member of Parliament for Berkshire; 1837–1857; With: Robert Palmer 1837–1857; Philip Pusey 1837–1852; George Henry Vansittart 1852–1857	Succeeded by Robert Palmer; George Henry Vansittart; Hon. Philip Pleydell-Bouverie
Peerage of Ireland
Preceded by George Barrington	Viscount Barrington; 1829–1867	Succeeded by George William Barrington
