= 1876 Berkshire by-election =

UK Parliamentary by-election

The 1876 Berkshire by-election was fought on 23 February 1876. The by-election was fought due to the resignation of the incumbent Conservative MP, Richard Fellowes Benyon. It was won by the Conservative candidate Philip Wroughton in an all Conservative fight.

By-Election 24 February 1876: Berkshire
Party	Candidate	Votes	%	±%
Conservative	Philip Wroughton	3,454	75.04	N/A
Conservative	Christopher Darby Griffith	1,149	24.96	N/A
Majority		2,305	50.08	N/A
Turnout		4,603	59.62	N/A
Conservative hold		Swing	N/A	
