= Leicester Viney Vernon =

British Conservative Party politician

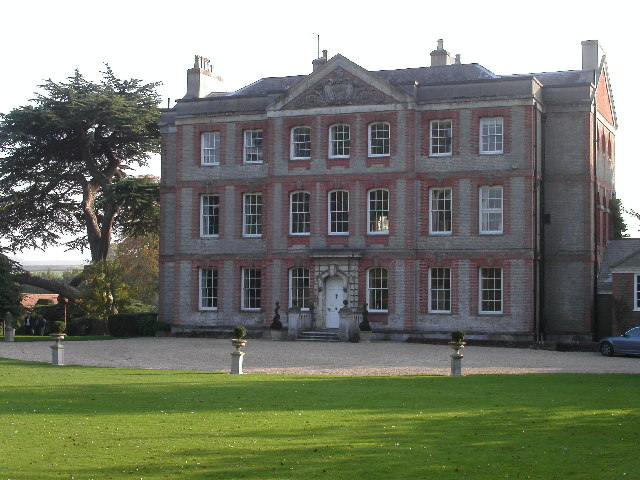
Vernon's home: Ardington House, near Wantage in Berkshire.

Leicester Viney Vernon (1798 – 14 April 1860) was a British Conservative Party politician from Berkshire.

He was originally Leicester Viney Smith. Elected as Member of Parliament (MP) for Chatham in Kent a by-election in June 1853, after the result of the 1852 general election in the constituency were overturned on petition. Vernon's by-election victory was itself the subject of a petition, which he did not defend, but the petition was subsequently withdrawn.

At the next general election, in 1857, he stood instead in Berkshire, where did not win a seat. He was returned to the House of Commons after a two-year absence at the 1859 general election, when Berkshire's 3 MPs were elected unopposed. He died the following year, aged 61.

From his uncle Robert Vernon he inherited Ardington House, in Ardington, Berkshire.

Parliament of the United Kingdom
Preceded by Frederick Smith	Member of Parliament for Chatham; 1853 – 1857	Succeeded by Frederick Smith
Preceded by George Henry Vansittart; Robert Palmer; Philip Pleydell-Bouverie	Member of Parliament for Berkshire; 1859 – 1860; With: John Walter 1859–1865; Philip Pleydell-Bouverie 1857–1865	Succeeded by Richard Benyon; John Walter; Philip Pleydell-Bouverie
