= Robert Palmer (MP) =

English politician

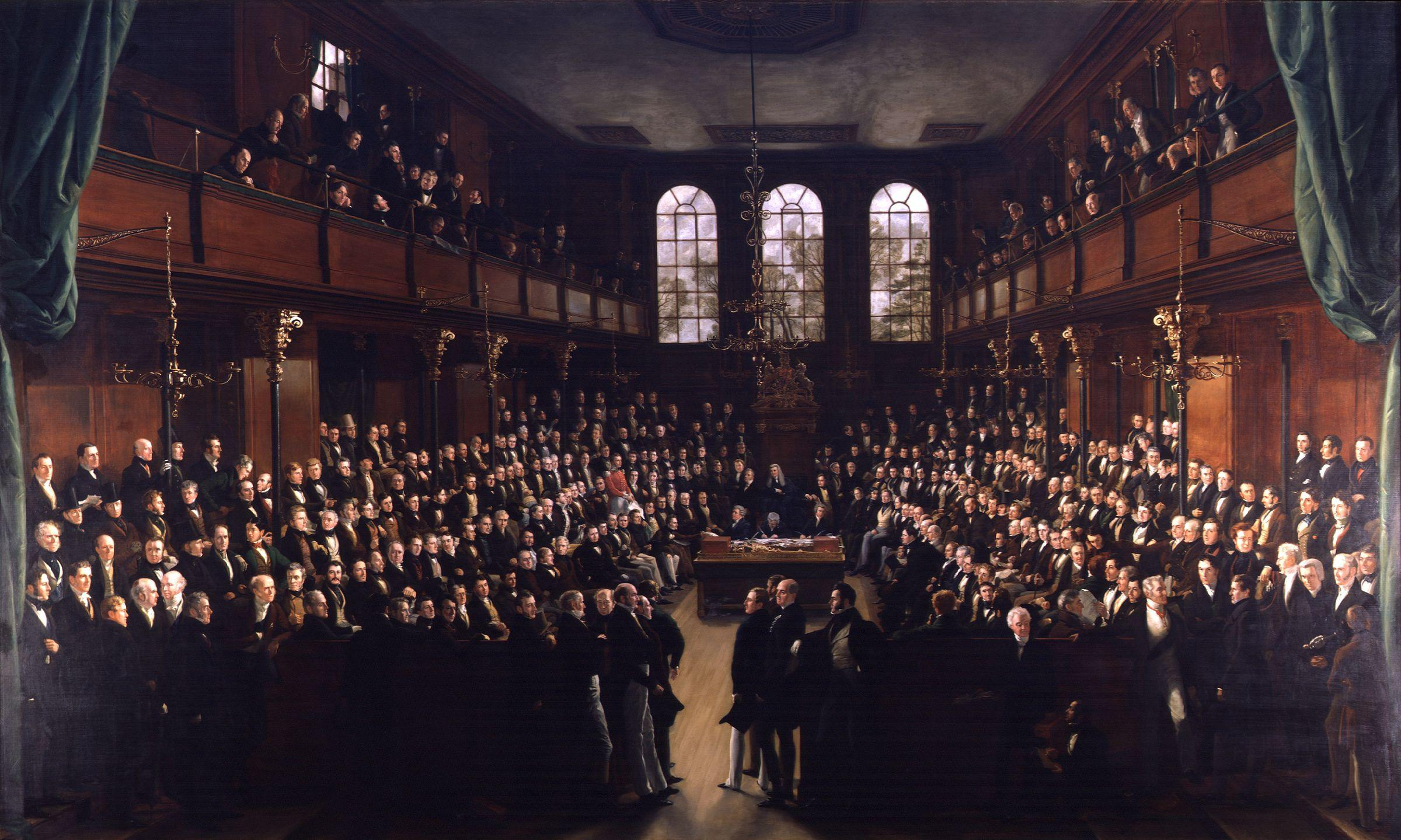

Robert Palmer, JP (31 January 1793 – 24 November 1872) was an English gentleman from Berkshire and Tory/Conservative Member of Parliament.

The son of Robert Palmer Senior and Jane Bowles, he lived at Holme Park in Sonning. Active in county politics, he was a magistrate in 1815 and High Sheriff of Berkshire in 1818. In his will, he endowed 'Robert Palmer's Almshouse Charity,' which remains active today.

== Notes ==
Parliament of the United Kingdom
Preceded by Charles Dundas; Richard Griffin	Member of Parliament for Berkshire; 1825–1831; With: Charles Dundas	Succeeded by Charles Dundas; Robert George Throckmorton
Preceded by Charles Dundas; Robert George Throckmorton	Member of Parliament for Berkshire; 1832–1859; With: Robert George Throckmorton 1832–1835; John Walter 1832–1837; Philip Pusey 1835–1852; William Keppel Barrington 1837–1857; George Henry Vansittart 1852–1859; Philip Pleydell-Bouverie 1857–1859	Succeeded by Philip Pleydell-Bouverie; Leicester Viney Vernon; John Walter
Honorary titles
Preceded by William Stone	High Sheriff of Berkshire; 1818	Succeeded by John Sawyer
