= William Forster (MP for Berkshire) =

English politician and sheriff of Berkshire (died 1574)

William Forster (died 10 Jan 1574/5) was an English politician and sheriff of Berkshire.

William was the son of Sir Humphrey Forster of Aldermaston House in Berkshire and father of Sir Humphrey Forster. He was educated at Oxford University and Lincoln's Inn.

In 1572, during the reign of Elizabeth I of England, he was elected the Member of Parliament for Berkshire but died in office two years later. He was also appointed High Sheriff of Berkshire in 1569.

He died in 1575. He had married Jane, the daughter of Sir Anthony Hungerford of Down Ampney, Gloucestershire;they had five sons, including his heir Sir Humphrey, and three daughters.

Parliament of England
Preceded by Sir Henry Neville (I); Richard Warde	Member of Parliament for Berkshire; 1572–1575; With: Sir Edward Unton	Succeeded by William Norris; Sir Edward Unton
