= Thomas Parry (ambassador) =

English politician (1541–1616)

Sir Thomas Parry (1541 – 30 May 1616) was an English politician and diplomat during the Tudor period.

He was the son of Sir Thomas Parry Senior of Welford Park in Berkshire, the Controller of the Royal Household, by his wife, Anne, the daughter of Sir William Reade of Boarstall House in Buckinghamshire. He was educated at Winchester School (1558).

He first entered Parliament in 1571 as member for Bridport. He was appointed High Sheriff of Berkshire for 1575–76 and 1587–88 and made a deputy lieutenant for Berkshire in 1593.

From 1586 to 1587, during the reign of Elizabeth I of England, he was the Member of Parliament for Berkshire. and for St Albans in 1610.

In 1601, he was knighted and appointed English ambassador to France for four years. Upon his return to England, he was made Chancellor of the Duchy of Lancaster. In 1614 he was again reelected to Parliament for Berkshire but, after being censured for interference in the election at Stockbridge, was dismissed from the House. He also temporarily lost his position as Chancellor of the Duchy of Lancaster.

He died intestate in 1616 at his home, Hamstead Marshall House, and was buried in Westminster Abbey. He had married Dorothy Brooke of Bristol, maid of honour to the Queen; they had no children.

Parliament of England
Preceded by John Hastings; Richard Inkpenne	Member of Parliament for Bridport; 1571; With: George Trenchard	Succeeded by Miles Sandys; John Russell, Lord Russell
Preceded by Sir Henry Neville; Edward Unton	Member of Parliament for Berkshire; 1586–1587; With: Edward Unton	Succeeded by Sir Henry Norreys; Sir Edward Hoby
Preceded by Tobie Matthew; Adolph Carey	Member of Parliament for St Albans; 1610–1614; With: Sir Henry Helmes	Succeeded by Thomas Perient; Henry Finch
Preceded by Sir Henry Neville; Francis Knollys	Member of Parliament for Berkshire; 1614–1616; With: Sir Henry Neville	Succeeded by Sir Richard Lovelace; Sir Robert Knollys
