= Philip Pusey =

British agriculturist and politician

Member of Parliament for Berkshire
- In office 1835-1852

Member of Parliament for Cashel
- In office 1831-1832

Member of Parliament for Chippenham
- In office 1830-1831

Member of Parliament for Rye
- In office 1830

Personal details
- Born: 25 June 1799
- Died: 9 July 1855 (aged 56)
- Political party: Tory
- Spouse: Emily Herbert (m. 1822)
- Parent: Philip Bouverie-Pusey (father)
- Relatives: Edward Pusey (brother)

Philip Pusey (25 June 1799 – 9 July 1855) was a reforming agriculturalist, a Tory Member of Parliament (MP) and a friend and follower of Sir Robert Peel.

== Life ==
Pusey stood for election in Rye at a by-election in 1830 and was originally declared elected, but following an election petition he was unseated by an order of the House of Commons on 17 May 1830.

He did not contest Rye at the 1830 general election, when he was elected as a Member for Chippenham. He did not contest Chippenham at the 1831 election, and stood instead in Rye. After riots in the town hall, Pusey agreed to withdraw from the election in return for a guarantee from General De Lacy Evans to protect the peace of the town; Evans won the seat.

Pusey was then returned at an uncontested by-election in July 1831 for the borough of Cashel in Ireland, and held that seat until the 1832 general election, when he stood unsuccessfully in Berkshire. He was elected without a contest for Berkshire at the 1835 general election, and held the seat until he retired from the House of Commons at the 1852 general election.

He was appointed as a Deputy Lieutenant of Berkshire in January 1831, and was nominated as High Sheriff of Berkshire in November 1833 and again in November 1834.

Succeeding to the Manor of Pusey in Berkshire in 1828, he built a reputation as a progressive and practical farmer. Disraeli called him "one of the most distinguished country gentlemen who ever sat in the House of Commons". His most notable contribution to farming was the development of a system of using lush water-meadows to support large flocks of ewes and early-maturing lambs. He was an early advocate of the use of earthenware drainpipes for field drainage.

He was one of the founders of the Royal Agricultural Society, and was chairman of the agricultural implement section of the Great Exhibition of 1851. He was a fellow of the Royal Society, a writer on varied topics in the Journal of the Royal Agricultural Society and the translator of the hymn Lord of our Life and God of our Salvation.

== Family ==
The eldest son of Philip Bouverie-Pusey, Pusey was the elder brother of the churchman Edward Bouverie Pusey. He married Lady Emily Herbert, daughter of Henry Herbert, 2nd Earl of Carnarvon, in 1822.

Parliament of the United Kingdom
| Preceded by Henry Bonham; Richard Arkwright | Member of Parliament for Rye; 1830; With: Richard Arkwright | Succeeded by De Lacy Evans; Richard Arkwright |
| Preceded by Frederick Gye; Ebenezer Fuller Maitland | Member of Parliament for Chippenham; 1830 – 1831; With: Joseph Neeld | Succeeded by Henry Boldero; Joseph Neeld |
| Preceded by Mathew Pennefather | Member of Parliament for Cashel; 1831 – 1832 | Succeeded by James Roe |
| Preceded by Robert Throckmorton; Robert Palmer; John Walter | Member of Parliament for Berkshire; 1835 – 1852; With: Robert Palmer 1832–59; John Walter 1832–37; Viscount Barrington 1837–57 | Succeeded by George Vansittart; Robert Palmer; Viscount Barrington |
