= Winchcombe Henry Hartley =

British politician (1740–1794)

Winchcombe Henry Hartley (1740–1794) was a British politician who sat in the House of Commons between 1776 and 1794.

Hartley was the second son of David Hartley, physician and philosopher and his second wife. Elizabeth Packer, daughter of Robert Packer MP of Bucklebury and was born on 20 May 1740. He inherited the estates in Berkshire and Gloucestershire of his uncle Henry Packer of Bucklebury in 1746. He entered Lincoln's Inn in 1756 and matriculated at Christ Church, Oxford, on 11 November 1757. His first wife was called Harriet. He married secondly Mary Jenkinson, widow of St. Anne’s, Soho, on 30 August 1777.

Hartley was returned Member of Parliament for Berkshire in a by-election on 21 February 1776. He was returned again in the 1780 without a contest. He followed his brother David’s politics and consistently opposed North’s Administration. The Public Ledger wrote in 1779, that he “sometimes speaks, which he had better let alone; his speeches, though not as long as those of his half-brother, are flat and empty.” In 1784 he was defeated in Berkshire. He also stood for Gloucestershire, but retired after the first day’s poll.

Hartley’s wife Mary died on 15 April 1786 and he married as his third wife Anne Blackwell, daughter of Samuel Blackwell MP of Williamstrip Park, Gloucestershire, on 25 August 1787. He had joined the Whig Club shortly after his defeat in 1784 and regained the Berkshire seat in the 1790 general election, when he was returned unopposed on the interest dominated by Lord Craven. He was appointed lieutenant-colonel commandant of the North Gloucestershire Militia (in succession to Blackwell) in 1785, and was promoted to colonel in 1793 when the regiment was embodied at the beginning of the French Revolutionary War. However, by June 1793 he was in very poor health and died on 12 August 1794, aged 54.

Parliament of Great Britain
Preceded by Christopher Griffith; John Elwes	Member of Parliament for Berkshire; 1776–1784; With: John Elwes	Succeeded by George Vansittart; Henry James Pye
Preceded by George Vansittart; Henry James Pye	Member of Parliament for Berkshire; 1790–1794; With: George Vansittart	Succeeded by George Vansittart; Charles Dundas
