= John Elwes (politician) =

British politician, eccentric and miser (1714–1789)

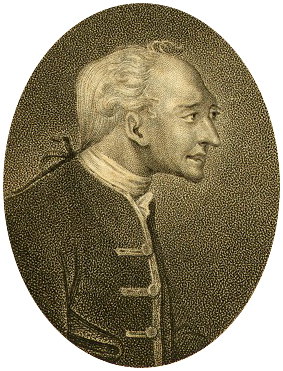

Member of Parliament for Berkshire
- In office 1772–1784
- Preceded by: Thomas Craven
- Succeeded by: Henry James Pye

Personal details
- Born: 7 April 1714 Southwark, England
- Died: 25 November 1789 (aged 75) Berkshire, England
- Occupation: Politician, moneylender

John Elwes MP (born John Meggot or Meggott; 7 April 1714 – 26 November 1789) was a member of parliament (MP) in Great Britain for Berkshire (1772–1784) and an eccentric miser, suggested to be an inspiration for the character of Ebenezer Scrooge in Charles Dickens' 1843 novella A Christmas Carol. Dickens made reference to Elwes in Bleak House (1853) – along with another notable 18th century miser, Daniel Dancer – and in his 1865 novel, Our Mutual Friend. Elwes was also believed to inspire William Harrison Ainsworth to create the character of John Scarfe in his 1842 novel The Miser's Daughter.

== Family background and early life ==
Elwes (birth name "Meggot") was born on 7 April 1714 to Robert Meggot, a Southwark brewer (grandson of Sir George Meggot, MP for that same borough), and Amy, daughter of Gervase Elwes, MP for Sudbury, Suffolk, and granddaughter of Sir Gervase Elwes, 1st Baronet, MP for Suffolk (see Elwes baronets). His maternal grandmother, Lady Isabella Hervey, was also well-known as a miser.

He received an education in the classics at Westminster School. After leaving, he travelled to Geneva where he embraced his skill for horsemanship and hunting. He was known as one of the best riders in Europe. It was at this time that he was introduced to Voltaire, to whom he was reported to bear a remarkable resemblance. However, Elwes was far more impressed with the quality of the horses at his riding school than by the genius of the French philosopher.

== First inheritance ==
Elwes inherited his first fortune from his father who died in 1718 when Elwes was just four years old. Although his mother was left £100,000 in the will (equivalent to £18,900,000 in 2025), she reputedly starved herself to death because she was too cheap to spend it. With her death, he inherited the family estate including Marcham Park at Marcham in Berkshire (now Oxfordshire), purchased by his father in 1717.

== Second inheritance ==
The greatest influence on Elwes' life was his miserly uncle, Sir Hervey Elwes, 2nd Baronet, of Stoke College and MP for Sudbury, whom Elwes obsequiously imitated to gain favour. Sir Hervey prided himself on only spending little more than £110 on himself per annum. The two of them often spent the evening railing against other people's extravagances while they shared a single glass of wine. In 1751, in order to inherit his uncle's estate, he changed his name from Meggot to Elwes. Sir Hervey died on 18 September 1763, bequeathing his entire fortune to his nephew. The net worth of the estate was more than £250,000 (equivalent to £42,900,000 in 2025), a figure that continued to grow despite Elwes' inept handling of his finances.

== Miserliness ==
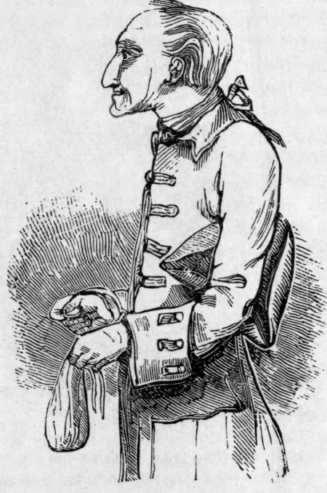
John Elwes, MP, with moneybag

On assuming his uncle's fortune, however, Elwes also adopted his uncle's miserly ways. He went to bed when darkness fell so as to save on candles. He began wearing only ragged clothes, including a beggar's cast-off wig he found in a hedge and wore for two weeks. His old clothes were so dilapidated that many mistook him for a common street beggar, and would put a penny into his hand as they passed. To avoid paying for a coach he would walk in the rain, and then sit in wet clothes to save the cost of a fire to dry them. His house was full of expensive furniture but also mouldering food. He would eat putrefied game before allowing new food to be bought. On one occasion, it was said that he ate a moorhen that a rat had pulled from a river.

Rather than spend the money for repairs he allowed his spacious country mansion to become uninhabitable. A near relative once stayed at his home in the country, but the bedroom was in such a poor state that the relative was awakened in the night by rain pouring on him through the roof. After searching in vain for a bell, the relative was forced to move his bed several times, until he found a place where he could remain dry. On remarking the circumstance to Elwes in the morning, the latter said: "Ay! I don't mind it myself... that is a nice corner in the rain!" His biographer, Edward Topham, who knew him well, recounted:

"it is curious to remark, how he contrived to mingle small attempts at saving.... After sitting up a whole night at play for thousands, with the most fashionable and profligate men of the time, amidst splendid rooms, gilt sofas, wax lights, and waiters attendant on his call, he would walk out about four in the morning, not towards home, but into Smithfield! to meet his own cattle, which were coming to market from Theydon-hall, a farm of his in Essex. There would this same man, forgetful of the scenes he had just left, stand in the cold or rain, bartering with a carcass butcher for a shilling."

According to author William Haig Miller, Elwes "complained bitterly of the birds robbing him of so much hay with which to build their nests." Even Elwes' health was limited by expense. In common with many misers, he distrusted physicians, preferring to treat himself in order to save paying for one. He once badly cut both legs while walking home in the dark, but would only allow the apothecary to treat one, wagering his fee that the untreated limb would heal first. Elwes won by a fortnight and the doctor had to forfeit his fee. He also bore a wound from a hunting accident. Legend has it that one day he was out shooting with a gentleman who was a particularly bad shot. This same man accidentally fired through a hedge, lodging several shot in the miser's cheek. With great embarrassment and concern, the gentleman approached Elwes to apologize, but Elwes, anticipating the apology, held out his hand, and said: "My dear sir, I congratulate you on improving; I thought you would hit something in time".

== Political career ==
In 1772, with the help of Lord Craven he became a Member of Parliament for Berkshire (his election expenses amounted to a mere eighteen pence). He entered the House of Commons in a by-election as a compromise candidate to replace Thomas Craven, which began the first of three terms. He held his seat unopposed until he stood down at the 1784 election. Elwes sat with either party according to his whim, and he never once rose to address the House of Commons. Fellow members mockingly observed that since he possessed only one suit, they could never accuse him of being a "turncoat". Being a member of parliament did, however, cause Elwes to frequently travel to Westminster. He made the journey on a poor lean horse, the route chosen being always the one whereby he could avoid turnpike tolls. He was known to put a hard-boiled egg in his pocket, and midway on his journey would sit under some hedge and eat his egg or sleep. After twelve years, he retired rather than face the prospect of laying out any money to retain his seat.

== Moneylending ==
Despite his exceptional frugality, Elwes lost huge sums of money to his colleagues in unrepaid loans, uncollected debts and dubious investments. He believed that one did not ask a gentleman for money, regardless of the circumstances. On one notable occasion Elwes, unsolicited, lent Lord Abingdon £7,000 to enable him to place a bet at Newmarket Racecourse. On the day of the race, Elwes rode on horseback to the racetrack with nothing to eat for fourteen hours save a piece of pancake which he had put into his pocket two months earlier and which he swore to a startled companion was "as good as new".

== Later years ==
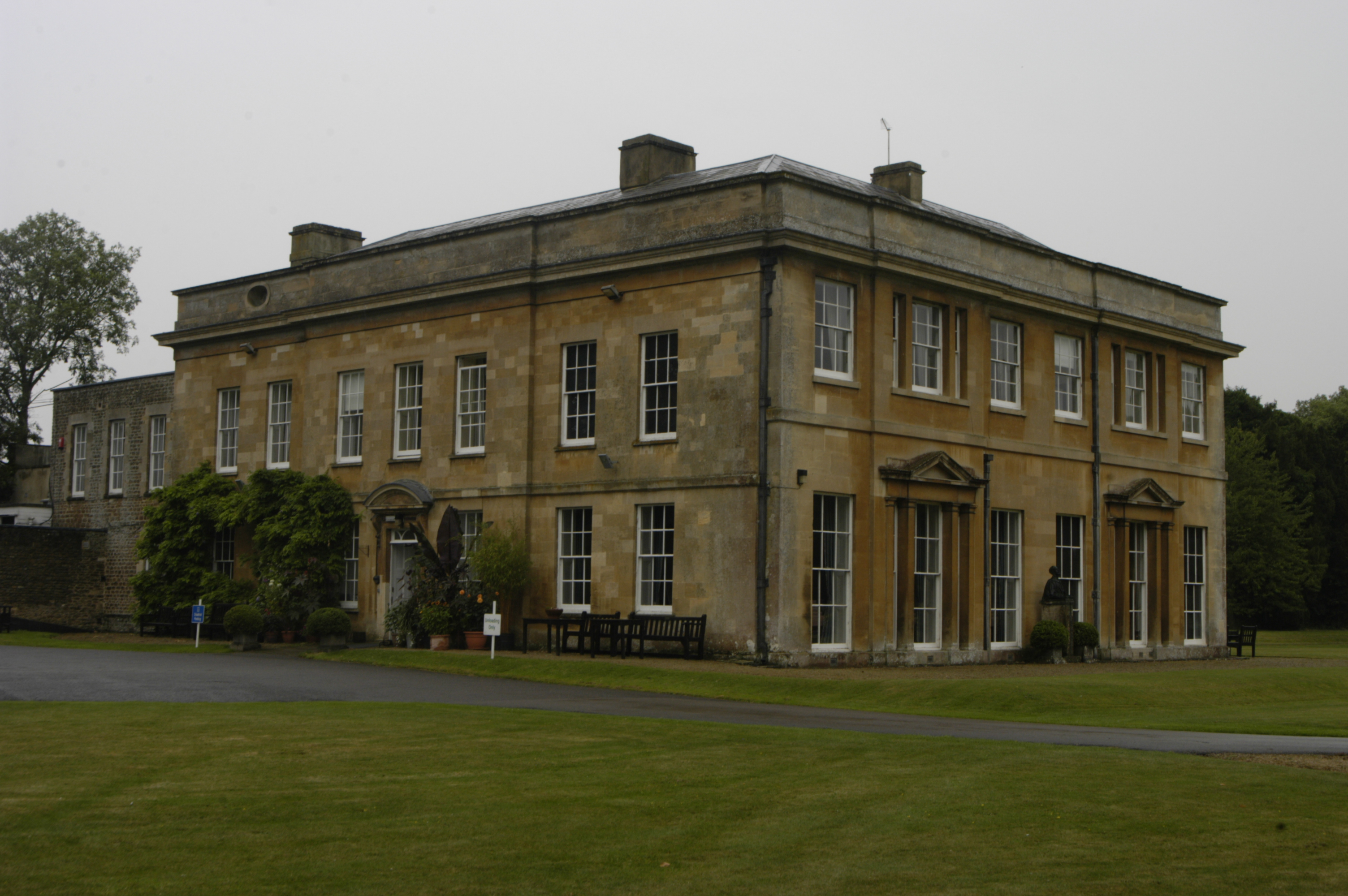
Marcham Park, formerly in Berkshire, from the north east.

After his parliamentary career ended, Elwes devoted his full energies to being a miser as he moved about among his many properties. At his neglected estates he continued to forbid repairs, joined his tenants in postharvest gleaning, and sat with his servants in the kitchen to save the cost of a fire elsewhere. Even on the coldest day of winter he was known to sit fireless at his meals, saying that eating was "exercise enough" to keep him warm. If a stableboy put out hay for a visitor's horse, Elwes would sneak out and remove it. In his last years, he had no fixed abode and frequently shifted his residence between his unrented London properties in the neighbourhood of Marylebone, seeking out the ones that were temporarily unoccupied. A couple of beds, a couple of chairs, a table, and an "old woman" (housekeeper) were said to be all his furnishings. This same housekeeper was known to frequently catch colds because there were never any fires and often no glass in the windows.

This practice nearly cost Elwes his life when he fell desperately ill in one of these houses and no one could find him. Only by chance was he rescued. His nephew, Colonel Timms, who wanted to see him, inquired in vain at Elwes's bankers and at other places. A pot boy recollected having seen an "old beggar" go into a stable at one of Elwes's uninhabited houses in Great Marlborough Street and lock the door behind him. Timms knocked at the door, but when no one answered, sent for a blacksmith and had the lock forced. According to Edward Walford in Volume 4 of his Old and New London (1878):

"In the lower part (of the house) all was shut and silent, but on ascending the stairs they heard the moans of a person seemingly in distress. They went to the chamber, and there on an old pallet bed they found Mr. Elwes, apparently in the agonies of death. For some time he seemed quite insensible."

He remained in this condition until some "cordials" could be administered by a neighbouring apothecary. After he had sufficiently recovered, Elwes stated that he believed he had been ill for "two or three days" and that there was an "old woman" in the house, but that for some reason or other, she had "not been near him"; that she had "been ill herself", but that he supposed she must have "recovered" and "gone away". Upon searching the premises, however, Timms and the apothecary found the woman stretched lifeless on the floor, having apparently been dead for two days.

Towards the end of his life, Elwes grew feverish and restless, hoarding small quantities of money in different places, continually visiting all the places of deposit to see that they were safe. He began suffering from delusion, fearing that he would die in poverty. In the night, he was heard struggling with imaginary robbers, crying: "I will keep my money! I will! Don't rob me! Oh, don't!" When asked who was there, Elwes would reply: "Sir, I beg your pardon, my name is Elwes, I have been unfortunate enough to be robbed in this house, which I believe is mine, of all the money I have in the world of five guineas and a half, and half a crown." The family doctor was sent for, and, looking at the dying miser, was heard to remark: "That man, with his original strength of constitution, and lifelong habits of temperance, might have lived twenty years longer, but for his continual anxiety about money." Even his barrister, who drew up his £800,000 will, was forced to undertake his writings in the firelight by the dying man's bedside in order to save the cost of a candle.

Elwes was known to sleep in the same worn garments he wore during the day. He was discovered one morning between the sheets with his tattered shoes on his feet, an old torn hat on his head, and a stick in his hand. It was in this condition he died on 26 November 1789. His burial took place in Stoke-by-Clare. After having lived on only £50 a year, Elwes left £500,000 (approximately £81,000,000 as of 2021) to his two illegitimate sons, George and John (whom he loved but would not educate, believing that "putting things into people's heads is the sure way to take money out of their pockets"), and the rest to his nephew.

The following summary of his character by Edward Topham, his friend and biographer:

"...His public character lives after him pure and without stain. In private life, he was chiefly an enemy to himself. To others, he lent much; to himself, he denied everything. But in the pursuit of his property, or in the recovery of it, I have it not in my remembrance one unkind thing that ever was done by him."

Besides being a member of Parliament, Elwes's accomplishments include financing the construction of a significant amount of Georgian London, including Portman Place, Portman Square, and parts of Oxford Circus, Piccadilly, Baker Street and Marylebone.

== In literature ==
The first account of Elwes' life was Edward Topham's The Life of the Late John Elwes: Esquire (1790), which was initially published in his paper The World. The popularity of this account is attested by the seven editions printed in the book's first year and the many later reprintings under various titles. The compendium Biographical Curiosities (1797, by James Ridgway) also included Elwes.

Elwes is believed to have inspired William Harrison Ainsworth to create the character of John Scarfe in his novel The Miser's Daughter (1842).

Ebenezer Scrooge may have been partly based on Elwes. Charles Dickens made reference to Elwes in Bleak House (1853)—along with another notable 18th-century miser, Daniel Dancer—and some years later in his last completed novel, Our Mutual Friend (1865). Elwes's descendent, actor Cary Elwes, would go on to star in the 2009 film adaptation of A Christmas Carol.

Parliament of Great Britain
Preceded by Arthur Vansittart; Thomas Craven	Member of Parliament for Berkshire with Christopher Griffith 1774–1776; Winchcombe Henry Hartley 1776–1784; 1772–1784	Succeeded by George Vansittart; Henry James Pye
