= Charles Dundas, 1st Baron Amesbury =

British politician (1751–1832)

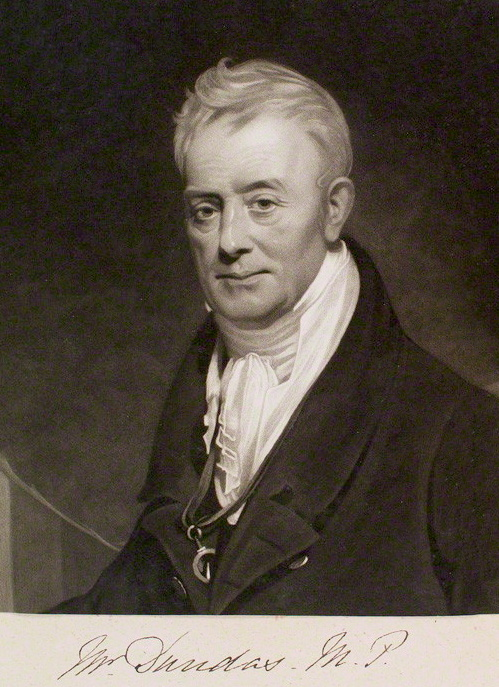
Lord Amesbury

Charles Dundas, 1st Baron Amesbury (5 August 1751 – 7 July 1832) was a British politician.

== Background and education ==
Charles was a younger son of Thomas Dundas of Fingask, MP for Orkney and Shetland (1768–1771) and a commissioner of police in Scotland (31 January 1771), who died on 10 April 1786. His mother was his father's second wife, Janet, daughter of Charles Maitland, 6th Earl of Lauderdale. He was educated at Edinburgh Academy and Trinity College, Cambridge. He was called to the bar from the Middle Temple, but devoted himself to a political life.

His father's younger brother Lawrence became a successful banker and an MP for over 30 years. Charles's older brother Thomas was a British Army officer who became Governor of Guadeloupe.

== Political career ==
Dundas first sat for the borough of Richmond in 1774, Orkney and Shetland from 1781 to 1784, Richmond again in 1784–1786, and finally for Berkshire (UK Parliament constituency), which he represented in ten successive parliaments (1794–1832). He was, finally, the second eldest member in the house. He was a liberal in politics. In 1802, on the resignation of Mitford (afterwards Lord Redesdale), the then speaker, he was nominated, by Sheridan, as his successor in opposition to Abbot. He, however, withdrew from the contest. Dundas was Counsellor of State for Scotland to the Prince of Wales, and colonel of the White Horse volunteer cavalry. He was raised to the peerage as Baron Amesbury, of Kintbury, Amesbury, and Barton Court in the County of Berkshire, and of Aston Hall in the County of Flint, on 11 May 1832. Apart from his political career he was also the first chairman of the Kennet and Avon Canal Company and the Dundas Aqueduct was named after him.

== Personal life ==
Lord Amesbury was twice married. His first wife, Anne, daughter of Ralph Whitley of Aston Hall, Flintshire, by whom he had one daughter, Janet, wife of Sir James Whitley Deans Dundas, who brought him the considerable estate of Kintbury-Amesbury (otherwise Barton Court) in Berkshire as well as other property. His second wife, whom he married on 25 January 1822, was his cousin, Margaret, daughter of Charles Barclay and widow of (firstly) Charles Ogilvy and (secondly) Major Archibald Erskine. He died 7 July 1832 at his residence in Pimlico, whereupon the title became extinct. Lady Amesbury died 14 April 1841.

== Issue ==
- Janet Whitley Dundas. Married on 28 April 1808 to Captain James Deans RN an Aide de Camp to the King, who assumed the additional names of Whitley Dundas. Only son of Dr Deans, by Janet sister of Lord Amesbury.

Parliament of Great Britain
Preceded by Sir Lawrence Dundas, Bt; Thomas Dundas	Member of Parliament for Richmond; 1775–1780; With: Sir Lawrence Dundas, Bt 1775; William Norton 1775–1780	Succeeded by Sir Lawrence Dundas, Bt; Marquess of Graham
Preceded by Robert Baikie	Member of Parliament for Orkney and Shetland; 1781–1784	Succeeded by Thomas Dundas
Preceded by George Fitzwilliam; Marquess of Graham	Member of Parliament for Richmond; 1784–1786; With: The Earl of Inchiquin	Succeeded by The Earl of Inchiquin; Sir Grey Cooper
Preceded by George Vansittart; Winchcombe Henry Hartley	Member of Parliament for Berkshire; 1794–1801; With: George Vansittart 1794–1801	Succeeded by Parliament of the United Kingdom
Parliament of the United Kingdom
Preceded by Parliament of Great Britain	Member of Parliament for Berkshire; 1801–1832; With: George Vansittart 1801–1812; Richard Griffin 1812–1825; Robert Palmer 1825–1831; Robert George Throckmorton 1831–1832	Succeeded by Robert George Throckmorton; Robert Palmer
Peerage of the United Kingdom
New title	Baron Amesbury; 1832	Extinct
