= Walter Fountain =

Fountain in the United Kingdom

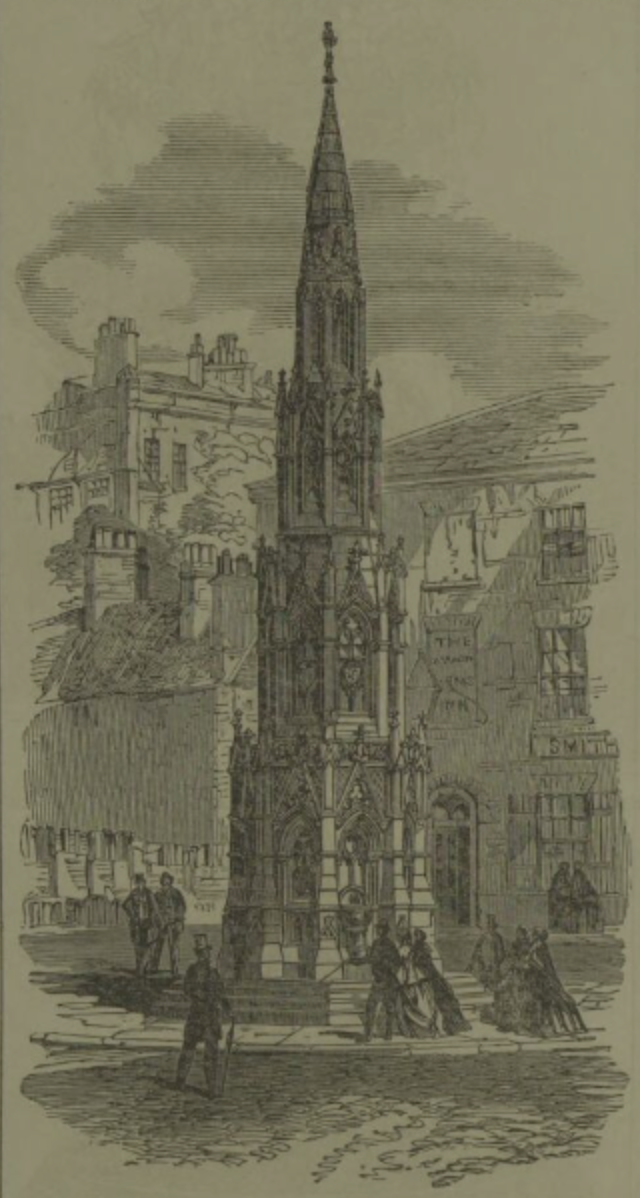
- Walter Fountain in the Illustrated London News, 25 August 1866

- Location within Nottingham
- 52°57′3.5″N 1°08′55.4″W
- Location: Nottingham, Nottinghamshire, England

History
- Built: 1866
- Original use: Drinking fountain
- Demolished: September 1950

Site notes
- Height: 40 feet (12 m)
- Architect: Richard Charles Sutton
- Architectural style: Gothic

The Walter Fountain was erected at the junction of Greyfriar Gate and Lister Gate, Nottingham in 1866.

The Walter Fountain was designed by Richard Charles Sutton and commissioned in memory of John Walter, MP for Nottingham, by Mr John Walter, at a cost of £1,000 (equivalent to £102,900 in 2025), with the Corporation of Nottingham providing the site, and laying in the supply of water. The foundation stone was laid on 24 October 1865 by the Mayor of Nottingham, William Page Esq. The fountain was opened on 3 July 1866 by the Mayor of Nottingham.

The fountain was described in the Illustrated London News of 25 August 1866 as

a structure of gothic character, highly decorated and of octagonal form. It rises in four stages to a height of 40 feet (12 m), the diameter at the base being 12 feet (3.7 m). Four basins of polished Aberdeen granite occupy four sides of the lower stage, the other four compartments being filled in with suitable inscriptions. Immediately above the basins on two sides are placed medallion portraits of the late Mr. John Walter, in white marble, considerably recessed, under traceried canopies. The first stage is surrounded by a trefoil pierced parapet. The eight compartments are finished with gablets having carved finials at the apex. The flat surface is relieved with diapered work. At the eight angles are buttresses, relieved with various pinnacles. These are carried up throughout three stages, and add much to the effect of the general outline. The second stage consists of a series of pointed arches under gablets, filled in with tracery, the lower portion containing shields bearing the town arms. The shafts in this stage are proposed to be of red Mansfield stone, having carved caps. The third stage, of diminished diameter, rises from the second stage, being connected therewith by a vertical stepping. This stage has the buttresses again diminished, and finished with pinnacles having carved terminals. From this stage the lines are brought up to a point, the apex being surmounted with an ornamental cross. A flight of octagonal steps leads up to the fountain.

In September 1950, some masonry toppled into the roadway, and the Works and Ways Department of the Corporation barricaded the fountain off from the public. It was demolished a few days later.
