= Philip Pleydell-Bouverie =

British Whig politician

Member of Parliament for Berkshire
- In office 1857-1865

High Sheriff of Somerset
- In office 1843

Member of Parliament for Downton
- In office 1831-1832

Member of Parliament for Cockermouth
- In office 1830-1831

Personal details
- Born: 21 October 1788
- Died: 27 May 1872 (aged 83)
- Party: Whig; Liberal
- Spouse: Maria à Court (m. 1811; died 1862)
- Children: 5
- Parent: Jacob Pleydell-Bouverie (father)
- Relatives: William Pleydell-Bouverie (brother); Duncombe Pleydell-Bouverie (brother); Anthony Duncombe (grandfather); William Bouverie (grandfather)

Philip Pleydell-Bouverie (21 October 1788 – 27 May 1872), was a British Whig and then Liberal politician.

== Background ==
Pleydell-Bouverie was a younger son of Jacob Pleydell-Bouverie, 2nd Earl of Radnor, by his wife the Hon. Anne, daughter of Anthony Duncombe, 1st Baron Feversham. The family home was Coleshill House in Berkshire (now Oxfordshire).

== Political career ==
Pleydell-Bouverie was returned to Parliament for Cockermouth in 1830, a seat he held until the following year, and then represented Downton until 1832. He remained out of the House of Commons for 24 years, but in 1857 he was elected as one of three Members of Parliament for Berkshire. He held the seat until 1865.

== Family ==
Pleydell-Bouverie married Maria (11 June 1782-27 Nov 1862), daughter of Sir William à Court, 1st Baronet, in 1811. They had five children:

- Letitia Anne, who married Rev. Charles Deedes, grandson of Sir Brook Bridges, 3rd Baronet. They had one son, Rev. Philip Deedes who by his wife Josephine Parker had one son, General Sir Charles Parker Deedes.
- Maria (d. 9 Oct 1903), who married Rev. William Pitt Trevelyan, grandson of Sir John Trevelyan, 4th Baronet and Sir Richard Neave, 1st Baronet. They had four sons.
- Unknown daughter who probably was stillborn.
- Caroline (d. 8 Feb 1867), married Rev. Hyde Wyndham Beadon, descendant of Bishop Richard Beadon. They had no known issue.
- Philip (21 Apr 1821-10 March 1890), married Jane Seymour great great granddaughter of Sir Edward Seymour, 5th Baronet. They had eight children, including their daughter Janet (wife of Sir Frederick Peel), Frances (wife of the Hon. Alexander Campbell, son of John Campbell, 2nd Earl Cawdor) and Alys (married to Rev. Arundell St John-Mildmay, a descendant of Sir Henry St John-Mildmay, 3rd Baronet and PM George Grenville).

She died in November 1862. Pleydell-Bouverie survived her by ten years and died in May 1872, aged 83.

Parliament of the United Kingdom
Preceded by Lord Garlies; Laurence Peel	Member of Parliament for Cockermouth; 1830–1831; With: Lord Garlies	Succeeded by John Lowther; Sir James Scarlett
Preceded by James Brougham; Thomas Creevey	Member of Parliament for Downton; 1831–1832; With: Thomas Creevey	Constituency disenfranchised
Preceded by Robert Palmer; The Viscount Barrington; George Henry Vansittart	Member of Parliament for Berkshire; 1857–1865; With: Robert Palmer 1857–1859; George Henry Vansittart 1857–1859; Leicester Viney Vernon 1859–1860; John Walter 1859–1865; Richard Benyon 1860–1865	Succeeded by Richard Benyon; Robert Loyd-Lindsay; Sir Charles Russell, Bt
Honorary titles
Preceded by Robert Charles Tudway	High Sheriff of Somerset; 1843	Succeeded by John Fownes Luttrell
