= Berkshire (constituency) =

Parliamentary constituency in the United Kingdom 1801–1885

- Former county constituency for the House of Commons
- County: Berkshire

1265–1885
- Seats: Two until 1832; Three from 1832 to 1885
- Replaced by: Abingdon, Newbury, Windsor and Wokingham

Berkshire was a parliamentary constituency in England, represented in the House of Commons of the Parliament of England until 1707, then of the Parliament of Great Britain from 1707 to 1800 and of the Parliament of the United Kingdom from 1801 to 1885. The county returned two knights of the shire until 1832 and three between 1832 and 1885.

== Boundaries and boundary changes ==
This county constituency consisted of the historic county of Berkshire, in south-eastern England to the west of modern Greater London. Its northern boundary was the River Thames. See Historic counties of England for a map and other details. The Great Reform Act made some minor changes to the parliamentary boundaries of the county, transferring parts of five parishes to neighbouring counties while annexing parts of four other parishes which had previously been in Wiltshire.

The county, up to 1885, also contained the borough constituencies of Abingdon (1 seat from 1558), New Windsor (2 seats 1302–1868, 1 seat from 1868), Reading (2 seats from 1295) and Wallingford (2 seats 1295–1832, 1 seat from 1832). Although these boroughs elected MPs in their own right, they were not excluded from the county constituency, and owning property within the borough could confer a vote at the county election.

== History ==
As in other county constituencies the franchise between 1430 and 1832 was defined by the Forty Shilling Freeholder Act 1430, which gave the right to vote to every man who possessed freehold property within the county valued at £2 or more per year for the purpose of land tax; it was not necessary for the freeholder to occupy his land, nor even in later years to be resident in the county at all.

At the time of the Great Reform Act 1832, Berkshire had a population of about 145,000, but only 3,726 votes were cast at the election of 1818, the highest recorded vote in the county before 1832, even though each voter could cast two votes. Although local landowners could never control a county the size of Berkshire in the way they could own a pocket borough, titled magnates still exercised considerable influence over deferential county voters: in the early 19th century Lord Craven and Lord Braybrooke were considered the "patrons" of the Berkshire constituency and could usually persuade the voters to support their favoured candidates.

The place of election for the county was the then county town of Abingdon. In 1880, according to the report in The Times (of London), the ballot boxes were taken to Reading for the count and declaration of the result, instead of these taking place at Abingdon as had happened previously. Before the Reform Act 1832 it was normal for voters to expect the candidates for whom they voted to meet their expenses in travelling to the poll and to provide food, liquor and lodgings when they arrived, making the cost of a contested election in some counties prohibitive, but this was less of a factor in a comparatively small county like Berkshire, and contested elections were not uncommon. Nevertheless, potential candidates preferred to canvass support beforehand and usually did not insist on a vote being taken unless they were confident of winning. There were contests in Berkshire at 11 of the 29 general elections between 1701 and 1832, but in the other 18 the candidates were returned unopposed.

Under the Great Reform Act 1832, the county franchise was extended to occupiers of land worth £50 or more, as well as the forty-shilling freeholders, and Berkshire was given a third MP. Under the new rules, 5,582 electors were registered and entitled to vote at the general election of 1832.

The constituency was abolished in 1885, and the county was divided into three single-member constituencies: the Northern or Abingdon Division; the Southern or Newbury Division; and the Eastern or Wokingham Division. The Abingdon Division absorbed the abolished parliamentary boroughs of Abingdon and Wallingford, whilst the parliamentary boroughs of Reading and New Windsor were retained, each with 1 MP.

== Members of Parliament ==
- Constituency created (1265): See Simon de Montfort, 6th Earl of Leicester and Montfort's Parliament for further details. Knights of the shire are known to have been summoned to most Parliaments from 1290 (the 19th Parliament of Edward I) and to every one from 1320 (the 19th Parliament of Edward II).

=== Knights of the shire 1265–1660 ===
Some of the members elected during this period have been identified, but this list does not include Parliaments where no member has been identified. The year given is that of the first meeting of the Parliament, with the month added where there was more than one Parliament in the year. If a second year is given this is a date of dissolution. Early Parliaments usually only sat for a few days or weeks, so dissolutions in the same year as the first meeting are not recorded in this list. If a specific date of election is known this is shown in italic brackets. The Roman numerals in brackets, following some names, are used to distinguish different MPs of the same name in 'The House of Commons' 1509–1558 and 1558–1603.

Parliament	First member	Second member
1300	Hugh le Blount	
1307	Hugh le Blount	
1313	Hugh le Blount (twice)	
1327	Thomas Foxley	
1332	Thomas Foxley	
1338	Thomas Foxley	
1370	Sir Thomas Foxley	
1372	Sir Thomas Foxley	
1380 (Jan)	Richard Brunce	
1383 (Oct)	Richard Brunce	
1384 (Apr)	Richard Brunce	
1384 (Nov)	Richard Brunce	
1385	Richard Brunce	
1386	Richard Brunce	Sir Gilbert Talbot
1388 (Feb)	Laurence Drew	Edmund Sparsholt
1388 (Sep)	Laurence Drew	William Golafre
1390 (Jan)	Richard Brouns	Sir John Kentwood
1390 (Nov)	John Arches	Thomas Childrey
1391	Laurence Drew	John Eastbury
1393	Sir John Kentwood	Edmund Sparsholt
1394	Sir Richard Abberbury	Sir William Langford
1395	William Brunce	William Wood
1397 (Jan)	Sir Richard Abberbury	Robert James
1397 (Sep)	John Englefield	John Hartington
1399	Robert James	Edmund Sparsholt
1401	John Golafre	Thomas Gloucester
1402	John Arches	Robert James
1404 (Jan)	Sir William Langford	Edmund Sparsholt
1404 (Oct)	John Arches	John Golafre
1406	Thomas Childrey	Laurence Drew
1407	John Golafre	Edmund Sparsholt
1410	John Golafre	Robert James
1411	returns missing	
1413 (Feb)	returns missing	
1413 (May)	John Golafre	Robert de la Mare
1414 (Apr)	John Golafre	Edmund Sparsholt
1414 (Nov)	Laurence Drew	John Shotesbrook
1415	returns missing	
1416 (Mar)	Sir Peter Bessels	John Golafre
1416 (Oct)	returns missing	
1417	Robert de la Mare	Thomas Rothwell
1419	Thomas Beckingham	John Shotesbrook
1420	William Danvers	Thomas Rothwell
1421 (May)	William Fynderne	John Golafre
1421 (Dec)	William Danvers	William Perkins
1422	John Golafre	
1423	Sir Peter Bessels	
1425		
1426	John Golafre	
1427	John Golafre	
1429	John Golafre	
1485	__? Fetiplace	
1491	William Harcourt	
1510	Sir Thomas Englefield	?
1512		
1515		
1529	Sir William Essex	Sir Richard Weston
1536		
1539	Sir Thomas Pope	Richard Brydges
1542	Sir William Essex	Thomas Weldon
1545		
1547	Henry Norreys	Thomas Denton
1553 (Mar)	Sir Henry Neville	Sir William Fitzwilliam (I)
1553 (Oct)	Sir Francis Englefield	William Hyde
1554 (Apr)	Sir Richard Brydges	William Hyde
1554 (Nov)	Sir Richard Brydges	Sir Francis Englefield
1555	William Hyde	Sir Francis Englefield
1558	John Fettiplace	Sir Francis Englefield
1558–1559	Sir William Fitzwilliam (I)	Sir Henry Neville
1562–1563	John Cheney	Sir Henry Neville
1571	Sir Henry Neville	Richard Warde
1572 (Apr)	Sir Edward Unton	William Forster, died and replaced Feb 1576 by William Norris, also died and was repl. in 1580 by ?Edward Hoby
1584 (Nov)	Sir Henry Neville	Edward Unton
1586 (Oct)	Edward Unton	Thomas Parry
1588 (Oct)	Sir Henry Norreys (II)	Sir Edward Hoby
1593	Sir Henry Unton	Sir Humphrey Forster
1597 (Sep)	Sir Henry Norreys (II)	Francis Knollys
1601	Sr Richard Lovelace	George Hyde
1604	Sir Henry Neville	Francis Knollys
1614	Sir Henry Neville	Sir Thomas Parry
1621	Sir Richard Lovelace	Sir Robert Knollys
1624	Edmund Dunch	Sir Richard Harrison
1625	Edmund Dunch	Sir Francis Knollys
1626	John Fettiplace	Edmund Dunch
1628	John Fettiplace	Sir Richard Harrison
1629–1640	No parliaments summoned	
Apr 1640	John Fettiplace	Henry Marten,
Nov 1640	John Fettiplace, disabled 1644 replaced by Philip Herbert, 4th Earl of Pembroke who died and was replaced by Henry Neville	Henry Marten

Parliament	First member	Second member	Third member	Fourth member	Fifth member
1653	Samuel Dunch	Vincent Goddard	Thomas Wood	Three seats only	
1654	George Purefoy	Edmund Dunch	Sir Robert Pye	John Dunch	John Southby
1656	William Trumball	Edmund Dunch	William Hide	John Dunch	John Southby
1659	John Dunch	Sir Robert Pye	Restored to two seats only		

=== Knights of the shire 1660–1885 ===
Year	First member	First party	Second member	Second party
1660	Richard Powle		Sir Robert Pye	
1661	Richard Powle		Hon. John Lovelace	
1670	Richard Powle		Richard Neville	
1677	Richard Powle		Sir Humphrey Forster, 2nd Bt.	
1678	The Earl of Stirling		Sir Humphrey Forster, 2nd Bt.	
March 1679	William Barker		Sir Humphrey Forster, 2nd Bt.	
August 1679	William Barker		Richard Southby	
1685	Sir Humphrey Forster, 2nd Bt.		Richard Southby	
1689	Lord Norreys		Sir Henry Winchcombe, 2nd Bt.	
1690	Sir Humphrey Forster, 2nd Bt.	Tory	Sir Henry Winchcombe, 2nd Bt.	
1695	Sir Humphrey Forster, 2nd Bt.	Tory	Richard Neville (the younger)	Whig
1701	Sir John Stonhouse, 3rd Bt.	Tory	Richard Neville (the younger)	Whig
1710	Sir John Stonhouse, 3rd Bt.	Tory	Henry St John	Tory
1712	Sir John Stonhouse, 3rd Bt.	Tory	Robert Packer	Tory
1731	Sir John Stonhouse, 3rd Bt.	Tory	Winchcombe Howard Packer	Tory
1734	William Archer	Tory	Winchcombe Howard Packer	Tory
1739	Peniston Powney	Tory	Winchcombe Howard Packer	Tory
1746	Peniston Powney	Tory	Henry Pye	
1757	Arthur Vansittart		Henry Pye	
1766	Arthur Vansittart		Hon. Thomas Craven	
1772	Arthur Vansittart		John Elwes	
1774	Christopher Griffith		John Elwes	
1776	Winchcombe Henry Hartley		John Elwes	
1784	George Vansittart	Tory	Henry James Pye	
1790	George Vansittart	Tory	Winchcombe Henry Hartley	
1794 by-election	George Vansittart	Tory	Charles Dundas	Whig
1812	Hon. Richard Neville	Tory	Charles Dundas	Whig
1820	Hon. Richard Neville	Whig	Charles Dundas	Whig
1825 by-election	Robert Palmer	Tory	Charles Dundas	Whig
1831	Robert Throckmorton	Whig	Charles Dundas	Whig
June 1832 by-election	Robert Throckmorton	Whig	Robert Palmer	Tory
December 1832	Third member added			

election	First member	First party	Second member	Second party	Third member	Third party
1832	Robert Throckmorton	Whig	Robert Palmer	Tory	John Walter	Whig
1834	Robert Throckmorton	Whig	Robert Palmer	Conservative	John Walter	Whig
1835	Philip Pusey	Conservative	Robert Palmer	Conservative	John Walter	Whig
1837	Philip Pusey	Conservative	Robert Palmer	Conservative	The Viscount Barrington	Conservative
1846	Philip Pusey	Peelite	Robert Palmer	Conservative	The Viscount Barrington	Conservative
1852	George Henry Vansittart	Conservative	Robert Palmer	Conservative	The Viscount Barrington	Conservative
1857	George Henry Vansittart	Conservative	Robert Palmer	Conservative	Hon. Philip Pleydell-Bouverie	Whig
1859	Leicester Viney Vernon	Conservative	John Walter	Liberal	Hon. Philip Pleydell-Bouverie	Liberal
1860 by-election	Richard Benyon	Conservative	John Walter	Liberal	Hon. Philip Pleydell-Bouverie	Liberal
1865	Richard Benyon	Conservative	Robert Loyd-Lindsay	Conservative	Sir Charles Russell, 3rd Baronet	Conservative
1868	Richard Benyon	Conservative	Robert Loyd-Lindsay	Conservative	John Walter	Liberal
1876 by-election	Philip Wroughton	Conservative	Robert Loyd-Lindsay	Conservative	John Walter	Liberal
1885	Constituency abolished					

== Elections ==
In multi-member elections the bloc voting system was used. Voters could cast a vote for one or two (or three in three-member elections 1832–1868) candidates, as they chose. The leading candidates with the largest number of votes were elected. In 1868 the limited vote was introduced, which restricted an individual elector to using one or two votes, in elections to fill three seats.

In by-elections, to fill a single seat, the first past the post system applied.

After 1832, when registration of voters was introduced, a turnout figure is given for contested elections. In three-member elections, when the exact number of participating voters is unknown, this is calculated by dividing the number of votes by three (to 1868) and two thereafter. To the extent that electors did not use all their votes this will be an underestimate of turnout.

Where a party had more than one candidate in one or both of a pair of successive elections change is calculated for each individual candidate, otherwise change is based on the party vote.

Candidates for whom no party has been identified are classified as Non Partisan. The candidate might have been associated with a party or faction in Parliament or consider himself to belong to a particular political tradition. Political parties before the 19th century were not as cohesive or organised as they later became. Contemporary commentators (even the reputed leaders of parties or factions) in the 18th century did not necessarily agree who the party supporters were. The traditional parties, which had arisen in the late 17th century, became increasingly irrelevant to politics in the 18th century (particularly after 1760), although for some contests in some constituencies party labels were still used. It was only towards the end of the century that party labels began to acquire some meaning again, although this process was by no means complete for several more generations.

Sources: The results are based on the History of Parliament Trust's volumes on the House of Commons in various periods for 1660–1820, Stooks Smith from 1820 until 1832 and Craig from 1832. Where Stooks Smith gives additional information this is indicated in a note. See references below for further details of these sources.

1660s – 1670s – 1680s – 1690s – 1700s – 1710s – 1720s – 1730s – 1740s – 1750s – 1760s – 1770s – 1780s – 1790s – 1800s – 1810s – 1820s – 1830s – 1840s – 1850s – 1860s – 1870s – 1880s

=== Elections in the 1660s ===
General Election 19 April 1660: Berkshire (2 seats)
Party	Candidate	Votes	%	±%
Non Partisan	Robert Pye	Elected	N/A	N/A
Non Partisan	Richard Powle	Elected	N/A	N/A
Non Partisan	John Southby	Defeated	N/A	N/A

- Note (1660): Vote totals not available

General election 14 April 1661: Berkshire (2 seats)
Party	Candidate	Votes	%	±%
Non Partisan	John Lovelace	Unopposed	N/A	N/A
Non Partisan	Richard Powle	Unopposed	N/A	N/A

=== Elections in the 1670s ===
- Succession of Lovelace as 3rd Baron Lovelace 25 November 1670

By-Election 12 December 1670: Berkshire
Party	Candidate	Votes	%	±%
Non Partisan	Richard Neville (the elder)	Unopposed	N/A	N/A
Non Partisan hold		Swing	N/A	

- Death of Neville 7 October 1676

By-Election 5 March 1677: Berkshire
Party	Candidate	Votes	%	±%
Non Partisan	Humphrey Forster	Unopposed	N/A	N/A
Non Partisan hold		Swing	N/A	

- Death of Powle 12 July 1678

By-Election 19 August 1678: Berkshire
Party	Candidate	Votes	%	±%
Non Partisan	The Earl of Stirling	Returned	N/A	N/A
Non Partisan	William Barker	Returned	N/A	N/A
Non Partisan hold		Swing	N/A	

- Note (1678): The vote totals are unknown but must have been close as the Returning Officer made a double return, which had not been resolved by the House of Commons when Parliament was dissolved on 24 January 1679

General Election 3 March 1679: Berkshire (2 seats)
Party	Candidate	Votes	%	±%
Non Partisan	Humphrey Forster	Unopposed	N/A	N/A
Non Partisan	William Barker	Unopposed	N/A	N/A

General Election 18 August 1679: Berkshire (2 seats)
Party	Candidate	Votes	%	±%
Non Partisan	William Barker	Unopposed	N/A	N/A
Non Partisan	Richard Southby	Unopposed	N/A	N/A

=== Elections in the 1680s ===
General election 28 February 1681: Berkshire (2 seats)
Party	Candidate	Votes	%	±%
Non Partisan	William Barker	Unopposed	N/A	N/A
Non Partisan	Richard Southby	Unopposed	N/A	N/A

General election 23 March 1685: Berkshire (2 seats)
Party	Candidate	Votes	%	±%
Non Partisan	Humphrey Forster	Elected	N/A	N/A
Non Partisan	Richard Southby	Elected	N/A	N/A
Non Partisan	The Earl of Stirling	Defeated	N/A	N/A

- Note (1685): Vote totals not available

General election 14 January 1689: Berkshire (2 seats)
Party	Candidate	Votes	%	±%
Non Partisan	Lord Norreys	Unopposed	N/A	N/A
Non Partisan	Henry Winchcombe	Unopposed	N/A	N/A

=== Elections in the 1690s ===
General election 24 February 1690: Berkshire (2 seats)
Party	Candidate	Votes	%	±%
Non Partisan	Henry Winchcombe	Elected	N/A	N/A
Tory	Humphrey Forster	822	N/A	N/A
Whig	Richard Neville (the younger)	793	N/A	N/A
Non Partisan	Lord Norreys	Defeated	N/A	N/A
Non Partisan	Robert Pye	Defeated	N/A	N/A
Turnout		1,615+	N/A	N/A

General election 28 October 1695: Berkshire (2 seats)
Party	Candidate	Votes	%	±%
Tory	Humphrey Forster	Unopposed	N/A	N/A
Whig	Richard Neville (the younger)	Unopposed	N/A	N/A

General election 3 August 1698: Berkshire (2 seats)
Party	Candidate	Votes	%	±%
Tory	Humphrey Forster	Unopposed	N/A	N/A
Whig	Richard Neville (the younger)	Unopposed	N/A	N/A

=== Elections in the 1700s ===
General Election 22 January 1701: Berkshire (2 seats)
Party	Candidate	Votes	%	±%
Tory	Humphrey Forster	Unopposed	N/A	N/A
Whig	Richard Neville (the younger)	Unopposed	N/A	N/A

General Election 26 November 1701: Berkshire (2 seats)
Party	Candidate	Votes	%	±%
Tory	John Stonhouse	Unopposed	N/A	N/A
Whig	Richard Neville (the younger)	Unopposed	N/A	N/A

General election 5 August 1702: Berkshire (2 seats)
Party	Candidate	Votes	%	±%
Tory	John Stonhouse	Elected	N/A	N/A
Whig	Richard Neville (the younger)	Elected	N/A	N/A
Tory	Humphrey Forster	Defeated	N/A	N/A

General election 9 May 1705: Berkshire (2 seats)
Party	Candidate	Votes	%	±%
Whig	Richard Neville (the younger)	Elected	N/A	N/A
Tory	John Stonhouse	Elected	N/A	N/A
Tory	Humphrey Forster	Defeated	N/A	N/A

General election 5 May 1708: Berkshire (2 seats)
Party	Candidate	Votes	%	±%
Tory	John Stonhouse	Unopposed	N/A	N/A
Whig	Richard Neville (the younger)	Unopposed	N/A	N/A

=== Elections in the 1710s ===
General election 18 October 1710: Berkshire (2 seats)
Party	Candidate	Votes	%	±%
Tory	John Stonhouse	1,977	40.46	N/A
Tory	Henry St John	1,877	38.42	N/A
Whig	Richard Neville (the younger)	1,032	21.12	N/A
Turnout		4,886	N/A	N/A

- Creation of St John as the 1st Viscount Bolingbroke

By-Election 23 July 1712: Berkshire
Party	Candidate	Votes	%	±%
Tory	Robert Packer	Unopposed	N/A	N/A
Tory hold		Swing	N/A	

General election 2 September 1713: Berkshire (2 seats)
Party	Candidate	Votes	%	±%
Tory	John Stonhouse	Unopposed	N/A	N/A
Tory	Robert Packer	Unopposed	N/A	N/A

General election 2 February 1715: Berkshire (2 seats)
Party	Candidate	Votes	%	±%
Tory	John Stonhouse	Unopposed	N/A	N/A
Tory	Robert Packer	Unopposed	N/A	N/A

=== Elections in the 1720s ===
General election 21 March 1722: Berkshire (2 seats)
Party	Candidate	Votes	%	±%
Tory	John Stonhouse	Elected	N/A	N/A
Tory	Robert Packer	Elected	N/A	N/A
Whig	Henry Grey	Defeated	N/A	N/A

- Note (1722): Vote totals not available. Sedgwick states that the majority was over 400 and that 2,177 electors voted.
- Note (1727–1768): Namier and Brook observe that there were no contested elections and that the county was represented by a succession of Tory country gentlemen. Sedgwick however identified a contested election in 1727.

General election 1727: Berkshire (2 seats)
Party	Candidate	Votes	%	±%
Tory	Robert Packer	1,620	36.02	N/A
Tory	John Stonhouse	1,558	34.65	N/A
Whig	The Viscount Fane	1,319	29.33	N/A

=== Elections in the 1730s ===
- Death of Packer 4 April 1731

By-Election 5 May 1731: Berkshire
Party	Candidate	Votes	%	±%
Non Partisan	Winchcombe Packer	Unopposed	N/A	N/A
Nonpartisan gain from Tory		Swing	N/A	

- Death of Stonhouse 10 October 1733

By-Election 5 May 1731: Berkshire
Party	Candidate	Votes	%	±%
Non Partisan	William Archer	Unopposed	N/A	N/A
Nonpartisan gain from Tory		Swing	N/A	

General election 1 May 1734: Berkshire (2 seats)
Party	Candidate	Votes	%	±%
Non Partisan	Winchcombe Packer	Unopposed	N/A	N/A
Non Partisan	William Archer	Unopposed	N/A	N/A

- Death of Archer 30 June 1739

By-Election 5 December 1739: Berkshire
Party	Candidate	Votes	%	±%
Non Partisan	Peniston Powney	Unopposed	N/A	N/A
Non Partisan hold		Swing	N/A	

=== Elections in the 1740s ===
General election 20 May 1741: Berkshire (2 seats)
Party	Candidate	Votes	%	±%
Non Partisan	Winchcombe Packer	Unopposed	N/A	N/A
Non Partisan	Peniston Powney	Unopposed	N/A	N/A

- Death of Packer 21 August 1746

By-Election 26 November 1746: Berkshire
Party	Candidate	Votes	%	±%
Non Partisan	Henry Pye	Unopposed	N/A	N/A
Non Partisan hold		Swing	N/A	

General election 8 July 1747: Berkshire (2 seats)
Party	Candidate	Votes	%	±%
Non Partisan	Peniston Powney	Unopposed	N/A	N/A
Non Partisan	Henry Pye	Unopposed	N/A	N/A

=== Elections in the 1750s ===
General election 17 April 1754: Berkshire (2 seats)
Party	Candidate	Votes	%	±%
Non Partisan	Peniston Powney	Unopposed	N/A	N/A
Non Partisan	Henry Pye	Unopposed	N/A	N/A

- Death of Powney 8 March 1757

By-Election 13 April 1757: Berkshire
Party	Candidate	Votes	%	±%
Non Partisan	Arthur Vansittart	Unopposed	N/A	N/A
Non Partisan hold		Swing	N/A	

=== Elections in the 1760s ===
General election 8 April 1761: Berkshire (2 seats)
Party	Candidate	Votes	%	±%
Non Partisan	Henry Pye	Unopposed	N/A	N/A
Non Partisan	Arthur Vansittart	Unopposed	N/A	N/A

- Death of Pye 2 March 1766

By-Election 2 April 1766: Berkshire
Party	Candidate	Votes	%	±%
Non Partisan	Thomas Craven	Unopposed	N/A	N/A
Non Partisan hold		Swing	N/A	

General election 30 March 1768: Berkshire (2 seats)
Party	Candidate	Votes	%	±%
Non Partisan	Arthur Vansittart	1,519	42.89	N/A
Non Partisan	Thomas Craven	1,389	39.22	N/A
Non Partisan	John Stone	634	17.90	N/A

=== Elections in the 1770s ===
- Death of Craven 14 December 1772

By-Election 30 December 1772: Berkshire
Party	Candidate	Votes	%	±%
Non Partisan	John Elwes	Unopposed	N/A	N/A
Non Partisan hold		Swing	N/A	

General election 20 October 1774: Berkshire (2 seats)
Party	Candidate	Votes	%	±%
Non Partisan	John Elwes	Unopposed	N/A	N/A
Non Partisan	Christopher Griffith	Unopposed	N/A	N/A

- Death of Griffith 12 January 1776

By-Election 21 February 1776: Berkshire
Party	Candidate	Votes	%	±%
Non Partisan	Winchcombe Henry Hartley	Unopposed	N/A	N/A
Non Partisan hold		Swing	N/A	

=== Elections in the 1780s ===
General election 27 September 1780: Berkshire (2 seats)
Party	Candidate	Votes	%	±%
Non Partisan	John Elwes	Unopposed	N/A	N/A
Non Partisan	Winchcombe Henry Hartley	Unopposed	N/A	N/A

General election 7 April 1784: Berkshire (2 seats)
Party	Candidate	Votes	%	±%
Non Partisan	George Vansittart	678	40.94	N/A
Non Partisan	Henry James Pye	677	40.88	N/A
Non Partisan	Winchcombe Henry Hartley	301	18.18	N/A

=== Elections in the 1790s ===
General election 24 June 1790: Berkshire (2 seats)
Party	Candidate	Votes	%	±%
Non Partisan	George Vansittart	Unopposed	N/A	N/A
Whig	Winchcombe Henry Hartley	Unopposed	N/A	N/A

- Death of Hartley 12 August 1794

By-Election 16 September 1794: Berkshire
Party	Candidate	Votes	%	±%
Whig	Charles Dundas	Unopposed	N/A	N/A
Whig hold		Swing	N/A	

General election 1 June 1796: Berkshire (2 seats)
Party	Candidate	Votes	%	±%
Tory	George Vansittart	1,332	37.95	N/A
Whig	Charles Dundas	1,322	37.95	N/A
Whig	Edward Loveden Loveden	846	24.10	N/A

- Note (1796): Party labels; poll 5 days (Source: Stooks Smith)

=== Elections in the 1800s ===
General election 12 July 1802: Berkshire (2 seats)
Party	Candidate	Votes	%	±%
Tory	George Vansittart	Unopposed	N/A	N/A
Whig	Charles Dundas	Unopposed	N/A	N/A

General election 6 November 1806: Berkshire (2 seats)
Party	Candidate	Votes	%	±%
Tory	George Vansittart	Unopposed	N/A	N/A
Whig	Charles Dundas	Unopposed	N/A	N/A

General election 11 May 1807: Berkshire (2 seats)
Party	Candidate	Votes	%	±%
Tory	George Vansittart	Unopposed	N/A	N/A
Whig	Charles Dundas	Unopposed	N/A	N/A

=== Elections in the 1810s ===
General election 12 October 1812: Berkshire (2 seats)
Party	Candidate	Votes	%	±%
Whig	Charles Dundas	1,717	44.99	N/A
Tory	Richard Griffin	1,574	41.25	N/A
Radical	William Hallett	525	13.76	N/A

- Note (1812): Poll 15 days; 1,992 voted. (Source: Stooks Smith). Stooks Smith and Thorn refer to the Hon. Richard Griffin as the Hon. R. Neville, a name he used before 1797 – see Baron Braybrooke for more details.

General election 25 June 1818: Berkshire (2 seats)
Party	Candidate	Votes	%	±%
Tory	Richard Griffin	1,224	40.56	−0.69
Whig	Charles Dundas	1,154	38.24	−6.75
Radical	William Hallett	640	21.21	+7.45

- Note (1818): Poll 15 days. (Source: Stooks Smith). Stooks Smith and Thorn refer to the Hon. Richard Griffin as the Hon. R. Neville, see note (1812).

=== Elections in the 1820s ===
General election 1820: Berkshire (2 seats)
Party	Candidate	Votes	%	±%
Whig	Charles Dundas	1,084	47.73	+9.49
Whig	Richard Griffin	1,055	46.46	+5.90
Whig	William Hallett	132	5.81	−15.40

- Note (1820): Poll 15 days; 1,258 voted. Stooks Smith refers to the Hon. Richard Griffin as the Hon. R. Neville, see note (1812). Stooks Smith commented that "this was the third election at which Mr Hallett, without any chance of success, kept the poll open for 15 days".

General election 1826: Berkshire (2 seats)
Party	Candidate	Votes	%	±%
Whig	Charles Dundas	Unopposed	N/A	N/A
Tory	Robert Palmer	Unopposed	N/A	N/A

=== Elections in the 1830s ===
General election 1830: Berkshire (2 seats)
Party	Candidate	Votes	%
Whig	Charles Dundas	Unopposed	
Tory	Robert Palmer	Unopposed	
Whig hold			
Whig hold			

General election 1831: Berkshire (2 seats)
Party	Candidate	Votes	%
Whig	Charles Dundas	Unopposed	
Whig	Robert Throckmorton	Unopposed	
Whig hold			
Whig gain from Tory			

- Creation of Dundas as Baron Amesbury

By-election, 7 June 1832: Berkshire
Party	Candidate	Votes	%
Tory	Robert Palmer	1,210	55.2
Whig	William Hallett	984	44.8
Majority		226	10.4
Turnout		2,194	c. 73.1
Registered electors		c. 3,000	
Tory gain from Whig			

- Poll 7 days

General election 1832: Berkshire (3 seats)
Party	Candidate	Votes	%
Tory	Robert Palmer	2,942	27.7
Whig	Robert Throckmorton	2,774	26.1
Whig	John Walter	2,479	23.3
Tory	Philip Pusey	2,440	22.9
Turnout		4,863	87.1
Registered electors		5,582	
Majority		168	1.6
Tory win (new seat)			
Majority		39	0.4
Whig hold			
Whig hold			

General election 1835: Berkshire (3 seats)
Party	Candidate	Votes	%
Conservative	Robert Palmer	Unopposed	
Conservative	Philip Pusey	Unopposed	
Whig	John Walter	Unopposed	
Registered electors		5,632	
Conservative hold			
Conservative gain from Whig			
Whig hold			

General election 1837: Berkshire (3 seats)
Party	Candidate	Votes	%
Conservative	Robert Palmer	2,556	30.0
Conservative	The Viscount Barrington	2,360	27.7
Conservative	Philip Pusey	2,312	27.1
Whig	Sir East George Clayton-East, 1st Baronet	1,302	15.3
Majority		1,010	11.8
Turnout		3,707	
Registered electors		5,599	
Conservative hold			
Conservative hold			
Conservative gain from Whig			

=== Elections in the 1840s ===
General election 1841: Berkshire (3 seats)
Party	Candidate	Votes	%	±%
Conservative	William Barrington	Unopposed		
Conservative	Robert Palmer	Unopposed		
Conservative	Philip Pusey	Unopposed		
Registered electors		5,685		
Conservative hold				
Conservative hold				
Conservative hold				

General election 1847: Berkshire (3 seats)
Party	Candidate	Votes	%	±%
Conservative	William Barrington	Unopposed		
Conservative	Robert Palmer	Unopposed		
Peelite	Philip Pusey	Unopposed		
Registered electors		5,241		
Conservative hold				
Conservative hold				
Peelite gain from Conservative				

=== Elections in the 1850s ===
General election 1852: Berkshire (3 seats)
Party	Candidate	Votes	%	±%
Conservative	George Henry Vansittart	1,741	33.2	N/A
Conservative	Robert Palmer	1,705	32.6	N/A
Conservative	William Barrington	1,636	31.2	N/A
Peelite	John Walter	155	3.0	N/A
Majority		1,481	28.2	N/A
Turnout		1,746 (est)	34.0 (est)	N/A
Registered electors		5,129		
Conservative hold		Swing	N/A	
Conservative hold		Swing	N/A	
Conservative gain from Peelite		Swing	N/A	

General election 1857: Berkshire (3 seats)
Party	Candidate	Votes	%	±%
Conservative	Robert Palmer	1,802	29.2	−3.4
Whig	Philip Pleydell-Bouverie	1,524	24.7	N/A
Conservative	George Henry Vansittart	1,494	24.2	−9.0
Conservative	Leicester Viney Vernon	1,360	22.0	−9.2
Turnout		3,090 (est)	63.3 (est)	+29.3
Registered electors		4,884		
Majority		278	4.5	−23.7
Conservative hold		Swing	−5.3	
Majority		164	2.7	N/A
Whig gain from Conservative		Swing	+21.7	
Conservative hold		Swing	−8.1	

General election 1859: Berkshire (3 seats)
Party	Candidate	Votes	%	±%
Liberal	Philip Pleydell-Bouverie	Unopposed		
Conservative	Leicester Viney Vernon	Unopposed		
Liberal	John Walter	Unopposed		
Registered electors		4,791		
Liberal hold				
Conservative hold				
Liberal gain from Conservative				

=== Elections in the 1860s ===
- Death of Vernon

By-Election 2 May 1860: Berkshire
Party	Candidate	Votes	%	±%
Conservative	Richard Benyon	Unopposed		
Conservative hold				

General election 1865: Berkshire (3 seats)
Party	Candidate	Votes	%	±%
Conservative	Robert Loyd-Lindsay	2,227	19.0	N/A
Conservative	Richard Benyon	2,192	18.7	N/A
Conservative	Charles Russell	2,117	18.0	N/A
Liberal	John Walter	1,813	15.4	N/A
Liberal	Viscount Uffington	1,809	15.4	N/A
Liberal	Philip Pleydell-Bouverie	1,583	13.5	N/A
Majority		304	2.6	N/A
Turnout		3,914 (est)	77.3 (est)	N/A
Registered electors		5,066		
Conservative hold		Swing	N/A	
Conservative gain from Liberal		Swing	N/A	
Conservative gain from Liberal		Swing	N/A	

General election 1868: Berkshire (3 seats)
Party	Candidate	Votes	%	±%
Conservative	Robert Loyd-Lindsay	3,231	27.9	+8.9
Conservative	Richard Benyon	3,171	27.3	+8.6
Liberal	John Walter	2,747	23.7	+8.3
Liberal	Auberon Herbert	2,450	21.1	+5.7
Majority		424	3.6	+1.0
Turnout		5,800 (est)	75.8 (est)	−1.5
Registered electors		7,647		
Conservative hold		Swing	+0.3	
Conservative hold		Swing	+1.5	
Liberal gain from Conservative		Swing		

=== Elections in the 1870s ===
General election 1874: Berkshire (3 seats)
Party	Candidate	Votes	%	±%
Conservative	Richard Fellowes Benyon	Unopposed		
Conservative	Robert Loyd-Lindsay	Unopposed		
Liberal	John Walter	Unopposed		
Registered electors		7,745		
Conservative hold				
Conservative hold				
Liberal hold				

- Resignation of Benyon

By-Election 24 February 1876: Berkshire
Party	Candidate	Votes	%	±%
Conservative	Philip Wroughton	3,454	75.0	N/A
Ind. Conservative	Christopher Darby Griffith	1,149	25.0	N/A
Majority		2,305	50.0	N/A
Turnout		4,603	59.6	N/A
Registered electors		7,721		
Conservative hold		Swing	N/A	

=== Elections in the 1880s ===
General election 10 April 1880: Berkshire (3 seats)
Party	Candidate	Votes	%	±%
Conservative	Robert Loyd-Lindsay	3,294	32.8	N/A
Conservative	Philip Wroughton	3,272	32.5	N/A
Liberal	John Walter	1,794	17.8	N/A
Liberal	Thomas Rogers	1,696	16.9	N/A
Majority		1,478	14.7	N/A
Turnout		5,028 (est)	62.4 (est)	N/A
Registered electors		8,061		
Conservative hold		Swing	N/A	
Conservative hold		Swing	N/A	
Liberal hold		Swing	N/A	

- Constituency divided in the 1885 redistribution

== See also ==
- List of former United Kingdom Parliament constituencies
- Unreformed House of Commons
