= Richard Southby =

English politician

Richard Southby (1623 – 7 January 1704) was an English politician who sat in the House of Commons in 1659 and from 1679 to 1689.

Southby was the son of John Southby of Carswell Manor in the parish of Buckland in Berkshire (now Oxfordshire) and his wife, Elizabeth daughter and heiress of William Wiseman of Steventon in Berkshire (now Oxfordshire). His father was MP for Berkshire. Southby matriculated at Lincoln College, Oxford on 14 May 1641 aged 17 and entered Gray's Inn on 4 Nov 1646.

In 1659, Southby was elected Member of Parliament for Cirencester in the Third Protectorate Parliament.

In 1660, Southby stood unsuccessfully at Berkshire for the Convention Parliament. He was elected MP for Berkshire in 1679 and sat until 1689. In 1696 he was High Sheriff of Berkshire.

Southby married Katherine, daughter and co-heiress of Robert Strange of Somerford Keynes in Wiltshire and they had nine children. He died in 1704 and was buried at Buckland.

Parliament of England
Preceded by John Stone	Member of Parliament for Cirencester; 1659; With: John Stone	Succeeded by Nathaniel Rich
