= George Henry Vansittart (MP) =

English politician, died 1885

George Henry Vansittart (23 April 1823 - 3 November 1885) was a British landowner and Member of Parliament who represented Berkshire from 1852 to 1859 for the Conservative Party.

Vansittart was the eldest son of General George Henry Vansittart, and grandson of George Vansittart MP, who had also represented Berkshire. He was born on 23 April 1823; his father died before he was one year old, and he succeeded to his grandfather's estates centred on Bisham Abbey in January 1825, before his second birthday. He was educated at Eton College and Balliol College, Oxford.

He was elected for Berkshire at the 1852 general election, and re-elected at the 1857 general election, but stood down in 1859.

He served as a justice of the peace in Buckinghamshire and Berkshire, and was a member of the Thames Conservancy. He died at his residence, Bisham Abbey, on 3 November 1885.
