= John Arches =

English politician (died c.1405)

John Arches (died c. 1405) was an English politician. He sat as MP for Berkshire in November 1384, November 1390, 1402, and October 1404.

He also served as tax collector of Berkshire in December 1384, controller in March 1404, justice of the peace of Berkshire from 15 July 1389 till June 1394, 28 November 1399 till July 1404, commissioner of arrests in Berkshire in October 1389, commissioner of array in March 1392, December 1399 in Berkshire and Berkshire and Buckinghamshire in September 1403, commissioner of weirs in June 1398, commissioner of inquiry in Gloucestershire in May 1404 concerning depredations by James Clifford, alnager in Berkshire from 20 July 1394 till 12 April 1402, and alnager for Oxfordshire and Berkshire from 13 January till 2 May 1403, bailiff of Bishop Wykeham of Winchester's manor of Witney, Oxfordshire from 14 January 1396 till c. 1403, his liberty in Oxfordshire and Berkshire before May 1403 and escheator of Berkshire from 24 November 1400 till 8 November 1401.

He was the son and heir of John Arches of East Hendred by Edith, the sister of John Eastbury and probably also the sister of John Eastbury. Before 1378, he married a woman named Joan and had at least two sons.
