= John Walter (editor, born 1818) =

English newspaper publisher and Liberal politician (1818–1894)

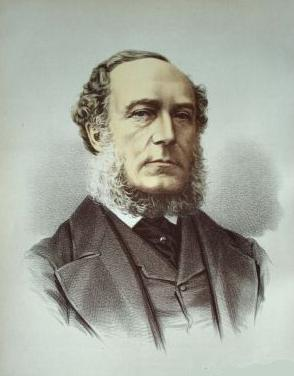
John Walter III, chromolithograph published in 1880

John Walter III (8 October 1818 – 3 November 1894) was an English newspaper publisher and Liberal politician who sat in the House of Commons variously between 1847 and 1885.

Walter was born at Printing-house Square, the eldest son of John Walter, editor of The Times. He was educated at Eton and Exeter College, Oxford, being called to the bar in 1847. On leaving Oxford he took part in the business management of The Times, and on his father's death became sole manager, delegating some of his work to Mowbray Morris. He was a man of scholarly tastes and serious religious views, and his conscientious character had a marked influence on the tone of the paper. It was under him that the successive improvements in the printing machinery, begun by his father in 1814, at last reached the stage of the "Walter Press" in 1869, the pioneer of modern newspaper printing-presses.

In 1847 Walter was elected to Parliament for Nottingham as a moderate Liberal, and was re-elected in 1852 and in 1857. In 1859 he was returned for Berkshire, where he lived at Bearwood House in Sindlesham. John Walter built a model village arranged around a green at Sindlesham, whose buildings included a "typically solid Victorian building" which housed a pub and still bears the family name today, as the Walter Arms.

Though defeated in 1865, John Walter III was again elected to Parliament for Berkshire in 1868, and held the seat until he retired in 1885.

Walter was twice married, first in 1842 to Emily Frances Court (d. 1858), and then in 1861 to Flora Macnab. His eldest son by his first marriage, John Balston Walter IV, was accidentally drowned at Bearwood on Christmas Eve in 1870, while trying to rescue his brother and cousin.

Walter was succeeded by Arthur Fraser Walter (1846–1910), his second son by his first marriage. A.F. Walter remained chief proprietor of The Times until 1908, when it was converted into a company. He then became chairman of the board of directors, and on his death was succeeded in this position by his son John.

Parliament of the United Kingdom
| Preceded by John Hobhouse; Thomas Gisborne | Member for Nottingham; 1847–1859; With: Feargus Edward O'Connor 1847–1852; Edward Strutt 1852–1856; Charles Paget 1856–1859 | Succeeded by Charles Paget; John Mellor |
| Preceded by Robert Palmer; George Henry Vansittart; Philip Pleydell-Bouverie | Member for Berkshire; 1859–1865; With: Philip Pleydell-Bouverie 1859–1865; Leicester Viney Vernon 1859–1860; Richard Benyon 1860–1865 | Succeeded by Richard Benyon; Robert James Loyd-Lindsay; Sir Charles Russell |
| Preceded by Richard Benyon; Robert James Loyd-Lindsay; Sir Charles Russell | Member for Berkshire; 1868–1885; With: Richard Benyon 1868–1876; Robert James Loyd-Lindsay 1868–1885; Philip Wroughton 1876–1885 | Constituency abolished |
