= Sir Charles Throckmorton, 7th Baronet =

Sir Charles Throckmorton, 7th Bt
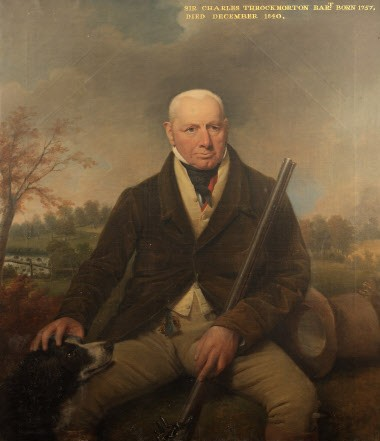
- Portrait of Sir Charles, by Laurence Joseph Cossé, between c. 1820–1830
- Born: Charles Throckmorton; 2 November 1757
- Died: 3 December 1840 (aged 83)
- Spouse: Mary Margaretta Plowden (after 1787)
- Parent(s): George Throckmorton; Anne Maria Paston
- Relatives: Sir Robert Throckmorton, 4th Baronet (grandfather); Sir Robert Throckmorton, 8th Baronet (nephew)

Sir Charles Throckmorton, 7th Baronet (2 November 1757 – 3 December 1840), was a member of a prominent English family of Roman Catholic dissenters.

== Early life ==
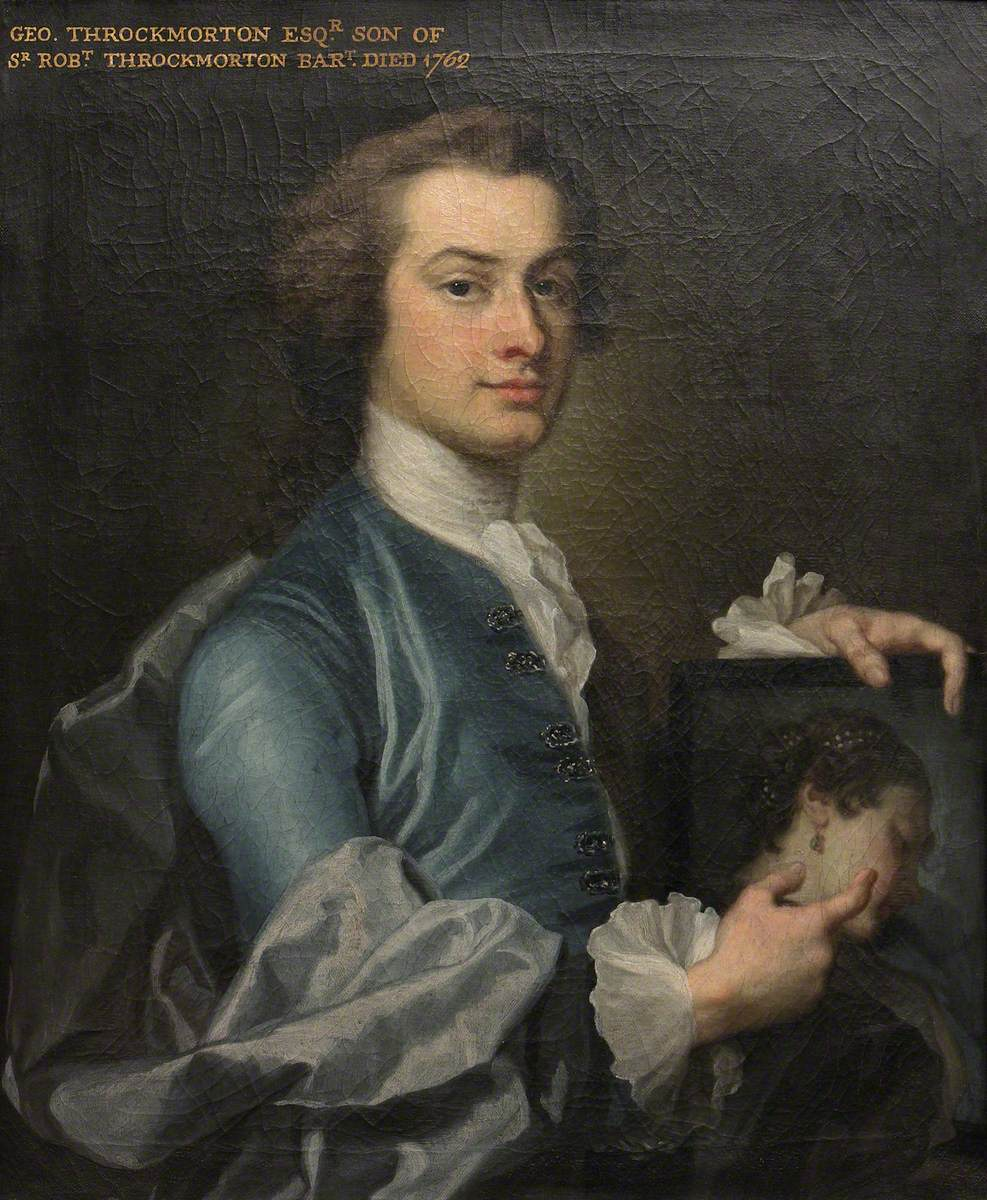
Portrait of his father, George, by George Knapton, between c. 1740 and c. 1745

Throckmorton was born on 2 November 1757 and baptised at Weston Underwood, Buckinghamshire into a wealthy and staunchly Roman Catholic family. (Note: At the time of his birth, Roman Catholics "could not vote, study at Oxford or Cambridge, become an MP, hold public office or serve in the Army; they were also subject to heavy fines if they failed regularly to attend an Anglican Church.") He was the son of George Throckmorton and Anne Maria Paston. His elder siblings were Robert Throckmorton (died unmarried in 1779), Sir John Throckmorton, 5th Baronet (who married Maria Catherine Giffard), Teresa Throckmorton (wife of Thomas Metcalf), Sir George Courtenay-Throckmorton, 6th Baronet (who married Catherine Stapleton). His younger brother was William Throckmorton (who married Frances Giffard and was the father of Sir Robert Throckmorton, 8th Baronet).

His father was the eldest surviving son of Sir Robert Throckmorton, 4th Baronet and, his first wife, Lady Theresa Herbert (a daughter of William Herbert, 2nd Marquess of Powis and the former Mary Preston). His maternal grandparents were William Paston of Horton Court and Mary (née Courtenay) Paston. Through his father's marriage to his mother, the Throckmorton family acquired the Manor of Molland in Devon.

== Career ==
Upon the death of his elder brother, George, on 16 July 1826, he succeeded as the 7th Baronet Throckmorton, of Coughton.

== Personal life ==
On 28 December 1787, Throckmorton married Mary Margaretta Plowden (b. c. 1769) in Clifton, Gloucestershire. She was a daughter of Edmund Plowden and Elizabeth Lucy (née Thompson) Plowden. Mary's paternal grandmother, Hon. Frances (née Dormer) Plowden, was the daughter of Charles Dormer, 5th Baron Dormer of Wyng, and her maternal grandmother, Elizabeth (née Lucy) Thompson, was the daughter of Sir Berkeley Lucy, 3rd Baronet. Mary's younger sister, Elizabeth Lucy Plowden, was the wife of Sir Henry Tichborne, 7th Baronet.

He died on 3 December 1840 at age 83, without issue. As his younger brother predeceased him, his nephew, Robert, inherited the baronetcy and estates in five counties.

Baronetage of England
Preceded by George Courtenay-Throckmorton	Baronet (of Coughton); 1826–1840	Succeeded by Robert Throckmorton
