= Sir Humphrey Forster, 2nd Baronet =

English politician

Sir Humphrey Forster, 2nd Baronet (c. 1649 – December 1711) was an English politician who sat in the House of Commons at various times between 1677 and 1695.

Shield of Forster. Sable a cheveron engrailed between three arrows argent.

Forster was the son of William Forster of Aldermaston House and his wife Elizabeth Tyrell, daughter of Sir John Tyrell of Heron, Essex. He was grandson of Sir Humphrey Forster, 1st Baronet (of Aldermaston). He succeeded to this Baronetcy and the Aldermaston manor and leased rectory on the death of his grandfather in 1663, his father having died in 1661.

In 1677, Forster was elected Member of Parliament for Berkshire in a by-election to the Cavalier Parliament. He was re-elected MP for Berkshire in the first election of 1679 but not in the second. He was elected MP for Berkshire again in 1685. and then in 1690 and 1695. He was Sheriff of Berkshire in 1704 and knighted around the same time.

Forster died at the age of about 62, when the Baronetcy became extinct and is buried in the church of St Aidan with his distant ancestors who received the earlier Forster baronetcy in Bamburgh, Northumberland and who held Bamburgh Castle for two centuries until the English Civil War.

== Sir Humphrey Forster, 1st Bt. ==
Humphrey Forster (c.1595-1663), son of Sir William Forster (died 1618), K.B., of Aldermaston and Sheriff of Berks, 1607. He married, circa 1616, Anne, daughter of Sir William Kingsmill, of Sydmonton, Hampshire. Sheriff of Berkshire, 1619-1620, and created baronet, 20 May 1620. Royalist and a compounder for £1,000. In 1649 his sister Mary (died 1668) married as her third or fourth husband the celebrated Elias Ashmole.

== Other Forster ancestors ==
- Sir Humphrey Forster (died 1500), of Harpenden = Alice, daughter of Sir Stephen Popham (MP for Hampshire: 1420, 1423,1425, 1431, 1442);
- Sir George Forster, K.B. (died 1533) = Elizabeth (died 1526) daughter and heir of John Delamere (De la Mare), of Aldermaston;
- Sir Humphrey Forster, Kt (died 1555). Sheriff of Berks, 1532 and 1545 = Elizabeth, daughter of William, Lord Sandys, of the Vine;
- William Forster (died 1574). Sheriff of Berkshire, 1567 = Jane, daughter of Sir Anthony Hungerford, Kt of Down Ampney;
- Sir Humphrey Forster, Kt. (died 1601). Sheriff of Berks, 1579 and 1592 = Margaret, daughter of John Barrett of Stanford Dingley (kinsman of Lord Barrett of Newburgh);
- Sir William Forster, Kt. (died 1618) = Mary (died 1661), daughter of Sir Mark Steward (Stewart) of Stuntney, the Isle of Ely (died 1604), by Anna, daughter of Robert Huicke, physician to Queen Elizabeth. Sometime MP, he was in the service of Sir William Paulet, 3rd Marquess of Winchester.

== Aldermaston legacy ==
His largest estate left the related Achard-Forster families in whose hands it had been since a 12th-century grant by Henry I of England in 1762, when it passed into a family due to a marriage, the Congreve family of the manor house, Congreve, Penkridge, Staffordshire. The estate had to be sold on a bankruptcy (following fire) and has been more than halved with a rebuilt manor house in Elizabethan style.

Forster married at St. Margaret's, Westminster on 26 November 1672, Judith, daughter of Sir Humphrey Winch, 1st Baronet and his wife Rebecca Browne, daughter of Martin Browne, Alderman of London.

Early in the 17th century the family funded a vestry south of the Church of St Mary the Virgin, Aldermaston and their own memorial vault beneath this. Four polished marble slabs in the floor commemorate:

- Humphrey's daughter, Rebekah, d. age 12 in 1676.
- Ann, daughter of William Forster, d. in infancy in 1664.
- John Forster, d. 1674
- Humphrey's mother, Lady Anne Forster, d. 1673.

On the south wall of the chancel are two stone slabs and lengthy family tablet from the vault entry, transcribed into the county history of 1923.

Baronetage of England
Preceded by Humphrey Forster	Baronet (of Aldermaston); 1663–1711	Extinct
