= Thomas Foxley =

English politician

Sir Thomas Foxley (c. 1305 – 1360) was MP for Berkshire several times in the 14th century, and Constable of Windsor Castle, also in the English county of Berkshire, from 1328 to his death.

His father, Sir John Foxley (c. 1270 – c. 1325) was a Baron of the Exchequer who held lands in Bray, Berkshire. His mother, Constance de Bramshill (d. 1333), may have been the heiress of the De Bramshill family from Bramshill in Hampshire. Thomas was probably born in Bray.

He became MP for Berkshire in 1325, and was appointed constable of Windsor Castle in 1328, soon after the accession of the 14-year-old Edward III. He retained the office until his death. He was responsible for rebuilding the castle for Edward III.

Foxley was also the builder of a castle at Bramshill that became the core of the later Bramshill House.
