= John Walter (editor, born 1776) =

English newspaper editor and politician (1776–1847)

John Walter Jr.
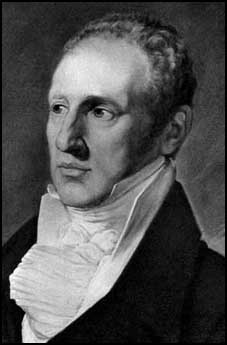
- Born: 23 February 1776; Battersea, London, England
- Died: 28 June 1847 (aged 71); London, England
- Education: Merchant Taylors' School
- Alma mater: Trinity College, Oxford
- Political party: Whig
- Spouses: Elizabeth Anne Gregory (m. 1815) Mary Smythe (m. 1818)
- Children: John Walter III
- Parents: John Walter (father); Frances Landen (mother)

John Walter Jr. (23 February 1776 – 28 July 1847) was an English newspaper editor and politician. He was the son of John Walter, the founder of The Times, and succeeded his father as the newspaper's second editor.

== Biography ==
Walter was educated at Merchant Taylors' School and Trinity College, Oxford. Around 1798, he joined his older brother in managing of their father's paper, and in 1803 he became the sole manager and editor of The Times.

He reportedly saw The Times as an unremarkable journal with little influence and accuracy. When he left it in 1847, The Times had become a reputable paper, consulted by domestic ministers and international audiences alike.

Walter maintained that he was responsible for the reputation of the newspaper and, as such, must defend it from outside influence. He expressed his opposition to the administration of William Pitt the Younger, after which the government pulled its advertisements, and he lost his appointment as printer to the Customs. It also brought the hostility of officials. When the King of Portugal sent him, via the Portuguese ambassador, a service of gold plate, he returned it.

Walter insisted on the anonymity of those whom he hired. He delegated editorial supervision from 1810 onward to Sir John Stoddart, then to Thomas Barnes, and in 1841 to John Thadeus Delane, but Walter ultimately guided the direction of policy.

In 1830, Walter purchased an estate called Bearwood at Sindlesham in Berkshire where he built a house, afterwards rebuilt by his son. He was appointed High Sheriff of Berkshire the same year. Two years later, he was elected to Parliament for the county, and retained his seat until 1837, as a member of the Whigs. In 1841 he was returned to Parliament for Nottingham, but was unseated the following year on petition. He was married twice, first to Elizabeth Anne Gregory, then to Mary Smythe, with whom he had a family. His eldest son, John, also worked in the newspaper. He died in London on 28 July 1847. The Walter Fountain was erected in Nottingham by his son in 1866 in his memory.

Parliament of the United Kingdom
Preceded by Robert Throckmorton; Robert Palmer	Member of Parliament for Berkshire; 1832–1837; With: Robert Throckmorton 1832–1835; Robert Palmer 1832–1837; Philip Pusey 1835–1837	Succeeded by Robert Palmer; Philip Pusey; The Viscount Barrington
Preceded by Sir Ronald Craufurd Ferguson; Sir John Cam Hobhouse	Member of Parliament for Nottingham; 1841–1841; With: Sir John Cam Hobhouse	Succeeded by Sir John Cam Hobhouse; George Larpent
Preceded by Sir John Cam Hobhouse; George Larpent	Member of Parliament for Nottingham; 1842–1843; With: Sir John Cam Hobhouse	Succeeded by Sir John Cam Hobhouse; Thomas Gisborne
Honorary titles
Preceded by George Henry Cherry	High Sheriff of Berkshire; 1830	Succeeded by John Eyston
