= Christopher Griffith =

British politician

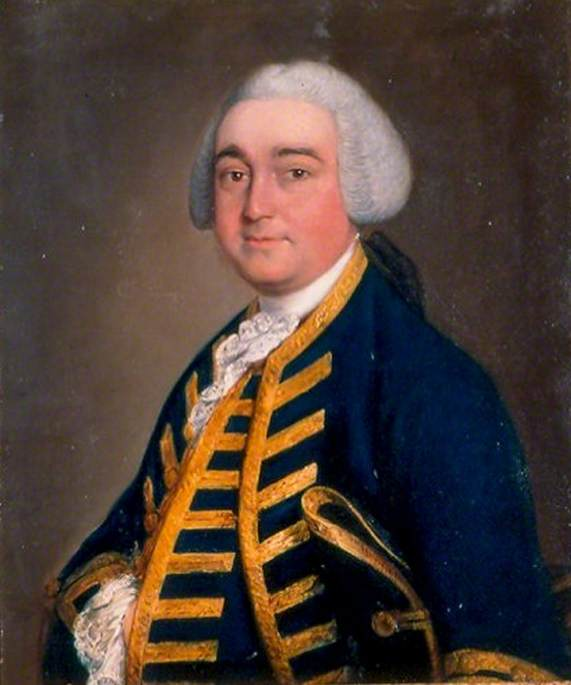
Portrait of Griffith by Thomas Gainsborough, 1775

Christopher Griffith (c. 1721–1776) was a British politician who sat in the House of Commons from 1774 to 1776.

Griffith was the son of Christopher Griffith of Winterbourne, Gloucestershire, and his wife Mary Brightwell, daughter of Loftus Brightwell of Padworth. He matriculated at Queen's College, Oxford, on 31 May 1738, aged 17, and was admitted at Lincoln's Inn in 1737. He was called to the bar in 1744. He married firstly Anne Chicheley, daughter of Richard Chicheley, on 1 March 1756. He married secondly Catherine Quintin, daughter of Sir William St Quintin, 4th Baronet, MP, of Harpham, Yorkshire on 26 November 1759

Griffith was returned unopposed as Member of Parliament for Berkshire at the 1774 general election. His only reported vote was with Opposition on 22 February 1775. He is not known to have spoken in the House. He died on 12 January 1776.

Parliament of Great Britain
Preceded by John Elwes; Arthur Vansittart	Member of Parliament for Berkshire; 1774–1776; With: John Elwes	Succeeded by John Elwes; Winchcombe Henry Hartley
