= Thomas Beckingham =

English politician (died 1431)

Thomas Beckingham (died 1431) was an English politician. He sat as MP for Berkshire in 1419.

He also served as justice of the peace for Oxfordshire and then Buckinghamshire, escheator of Oxfordshire and Berkshire, keeper of Wychwood Forest in Oxfordshire, bailiff for Bishop Henry Beaufort of Winchester, and commissioner of inquiry, array and to raise royal loans.

== Political career ==
From 11 October 1404 till February 1407, he served as justice of the peace for Oxfordshire; from 22 October 1404 till 1 December 1405, he served as escheator of Oxfordshire and Berkshire; from 14 February 1405 till 1407, he served as justice of the peace for Buckinghamshire; from 14 March 1405 till after July 1412, he served as Keeper of Wychwood Forest in Oxfordshire; by Michaelmas 1405 till his death he served as Bailiff for Bishop Henry Beaufort of Winchester in Berkshire; from 3 February 1407 till his death, he served as the aforementioned bishop's bailiff in Witney and Adderbury in Oxfordshire; from 8 March 1410 till February 1412, he served as justice of the peace for Oxfordshire.

In July 1412, he served as commissioner of inquiry in Oxfordshire concerning waste in Wychwood Forest; From 16 November 1413 till April 1418, he served as justice of the peace for Oxfordshire; in May 1415, he served as commissioner of array in Oxfordshire; from 14 December 1415 till 8 December 1416, he served as escheator of Oxfordshire and Berkshire; in February 1416, he served as commissioner of inquiry in Somerset and Dorset concerning the Chideock estates; in May 1418 and March 1419, he served as commissioner of array in Oxfordshire; from 12 January 1420 till February 1422, he served as justice of the peace for Oxfordshire.

In January 1420, he served as commissioner to raise royal loans; in February 1422, he served as commissioner of inquiry in Oxfordshire concerning false weights; from July 1423 till November 1432, he served as justice of the peace for Oxfordshire; from 13 November 1423 till 6 November 1424, he served as escheator of Oxfordshire and Berkshire; and in July 1428, he served as commissioner of inquiry in Oxfordshire and Berkshire concerning treasons and felonies.

== Family ==
Before 1412, he married his first wife Agnes and had one son. Before May 1418, he married his second wife Sibyl (born 1 August 1401), the third daughter of Thomas Childrey and they had two sons.

In 1413, the Merriscourt Manor passed through his marriage with Agnes to Beckingham.
