= Sir Robert Throckmorton, 8th Baronet =

English Whig and Liberal politician

Sir Robert Throckmorton, 8th Bt JP DL
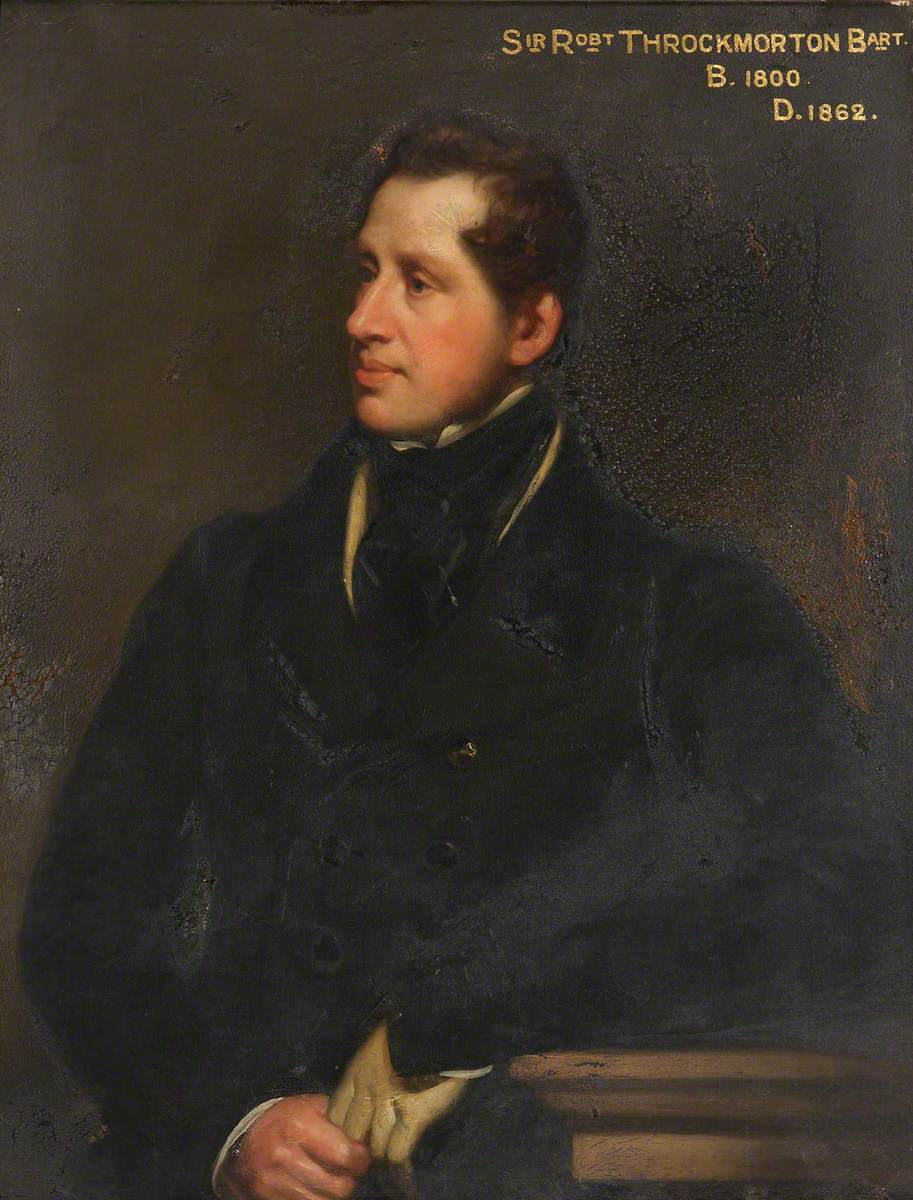
- Portrait by Thomas Phillips, c. 1830, at Coughton Court

High Sheriff of Berkshire
- In office 1843–1843
- Preceded by: Henry Mill Bunbury
- Succeeded by: Edwin Martin Atkins

Member of Parliament for Berkshire
- In office 1831–1835 Serving with Charles Dundas, Robert Palmer, John Walter
- Preceded by: Charles Dundas; Robert Palmer
- Succeeded by: Robert Palmer; John Walter; Philip Pusey

Personal details
- Born: Robert George Throckmorton; 5 December 1800; Mayfair, London
- Died: 28 June 1862 (aged 61); Park Lane, London
- Political party: Whig, Liberal
- Spouse: Elizabeth Acton (after 1829)
- Parent(s): William Throckmorton; Frances Gifford

Sir Robert George Throckmorton, 8th Baronet (5 December 1800 – 28 June 1862) was an English Whig and Liberal politician who sat in the House of Commons from 1831 to 1835.

== Early life ==
Throckmorton was born on 5 December 1800 at Queen Street, Mayfair, London. Throckmorton was the eldest son of William Throckmorton and his wife Frances Gifford, daughter of Thomas Gifford, 22nd of Chillington. The Throckmortons were a prominent Roman Catholic family, who continued to hear mass at the family home Coughton Court, Alcester, Warwickshire. In 1826 the family estate at Molland in Devon devolved to Throckmorton when his uncle succeeded to the baronetcy.

== Career ==
The Roman Catholic Relief Act 1829 allowed Catholics to hold national office for the first time in almost three hundred years. Throckmorton took advantage of the change in the law to become one of the first Catholic MPs after Daniel O'Connell achieved the feat in 1828 and eventually had Catholic Emancipation signed into law. At the 1831 general election he was elected MP for Berkshire, the location of his third country estate, Buckland Park (though it is now in Oxfordshire). He held the seat until 1835.

He also became a Justice of the Peace and Deputy Lieutenant for Berkshire. He was High Sheriff of Berkshire in 1843.

Throckmorton inherited the baronetcy in 1840 on the death of his uncle Sir Charles Throckmorton, 7th Baronet. He built a new Catholic church at the end of the south drive of Coughton Court, next to the ruins of the church built by an earlier Throckmorton in the 15th century which was confiscated from the family during the Reformation.

== Personal life ==
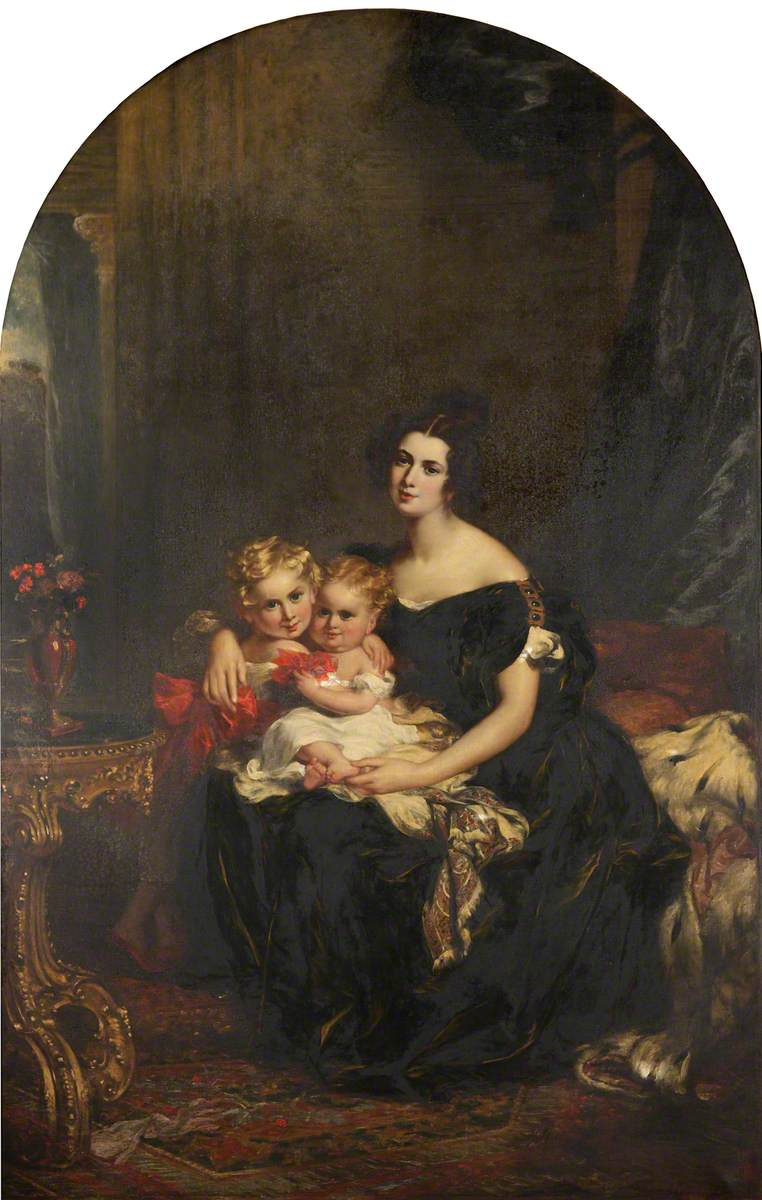
Lady Throckmorton with Two of Her Children, by John Partridge, c. 1833

On 16 July 1829, Throckmorton was married to Elizabeth Acton, daughter of Sir John Acton, 6th Baronet of Aldenham and Mary Anne Acton. Together, they were the parents of five sons and four daughters, including:

- Elizabeth Laura Caroline Throckmorton (d. 1927), who married Hon. Albert Joseph Stourton, son of Charles Stourton, 19th Baron Stourton and Hon. Mary Lucy Clifford (a daughter of the 6th Baron Clifford and granddaughter of the 8th Baron Arundell), in 1866.
- Emily Throckmorton (d. 1929), who married Col. Sir Gerald Richard Dease, son of Gerald Dease and Elizabeth (née O'Callaghan) Dease, in 1863.
- Courtenay Throckmorton (1831–1854), who died unmarried.
- Mary Elizabeth Throckmorton (1832–1919), a Lady-in-Waiting to Empress Elisabeth of Austria.
- Sir Nicholas William George Throckmorton, 9th Baronet (1838–1919), who died unmarried.
- Sir Richard Charles Acton Throckmorton, 10th Baronet (1839–1927), who married Frances Stewart Moore, daughter of Maj. John Arthur Moore (a director of the East India Company) and Sophia Stewart (née Yates) Moore, in 1866. After her death, he married Florence Helen Brigg, daughter of John Fligg Brigg and Martha Ann Adelaide Lockwood, in 1921.

Throckmorton died on 28 June 1862, at the age of 61, at Hereford Street in Park Lane, London.

Parliament of the United Kingdom
Preceded by Charles Dundas; Robert Palmer	Member of Parliament for Berkshire; 1831–1835; With: Charles Dundas 1831–1832; Robert Palmer 1832–1835; John Walter 1832–1835	Succeeded by Robert Palmer; John Walter; Philip Pusey
Honorary titles
Preceded by Henry Mill Bunbury	High Sheriff of Berkshire; 1843	Succeeded by Edwin Martin Atkins
Baronetage of England
Preceded by Charles Throckmorton	Baronet (of Coughton); 1840–1862	Succeeded by Nicholas Throckmorton
