= Richard Abberbury the Younger =

Member of the Parliament of England

Sir Richard Abberbury the Younger
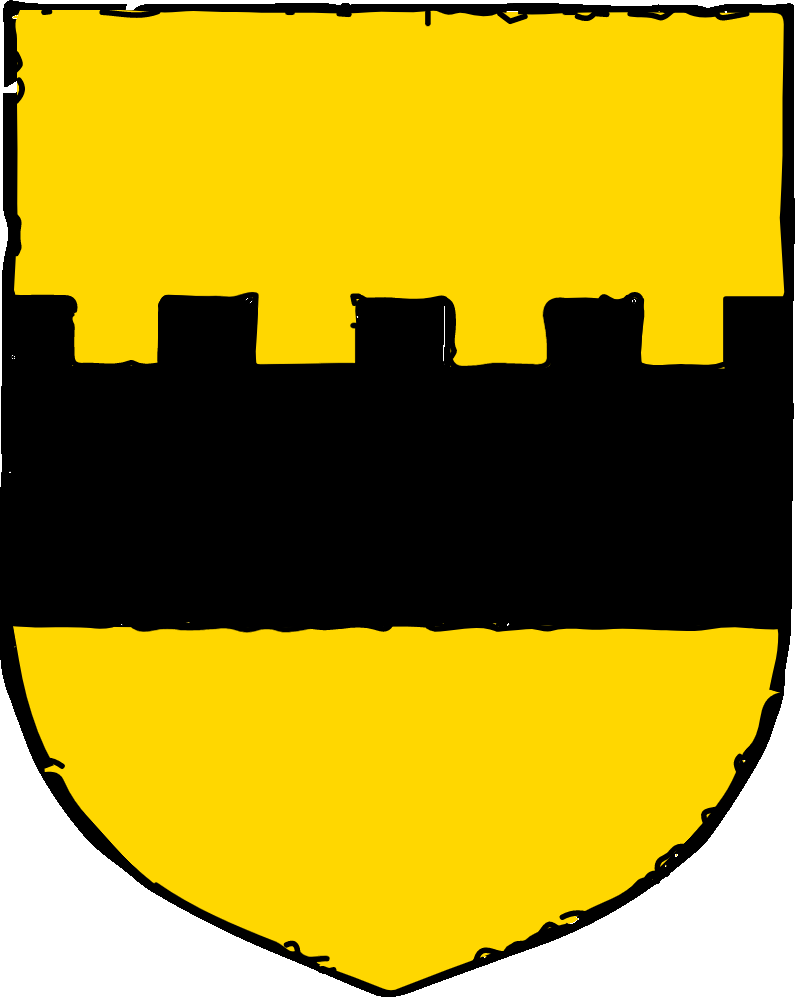

Member of the British Parliament for Berkshire =
- In office 1394, 1397

Personal details
- Born: 1350 Adderbury, Oxfordshire, England
- Died: 1416 (aged 65–66) Berkshire, South East England, England
- Spouse: Agnes "Coleshill" Abberbury
- Parents: Richard Abberbury the Elder (father); Agnes Arches (mother)
- Occupation: Chamberlain to John of Gaunt, Duke of Lancaster

Richard Abberbury (1350–1416) was an English politician, Justice of the Peace and chamberlain to John of Gaunt, Duke of Lancaster who served as the MP of Berkshire in 1394 and January 1397. He was the son of Richard Abberbury the Elder and brother of Lucy de Arches, Baroness Eythorpe.

== Early life ==
Sir Richard Abberbury the Younger was born in 1350 in Berkshire, South East England to Agnes "Coleshill" Abberbury (Née Shareshull) and Sir Richard Abberbury the Elder. Richard married Alice Abberbury in 1388, where he received the estates of his wife's paternal inheritance, which included the manors of Stainswick and Denchworth as well as a number of acreages at Lambourn, together with her interest for life in a substantial part of the Danvers estates, due to them eventually passing down to her son, William Danvers.

== Service to the Duke of Lancaster ==
As Adderbury's father, Sir Richard Abberbury the Elder, was serving to the court of Edward the Black Prince, Richard himself soon found himself in the service of the Prince's brother, John of Gaunt, whom he followed in 1370 when John of Gaunt was sent with a small army to Aquitaine to reinforce his ailing elder brother, the Black Prince, and his younger brother Edmund of Langley, 1st Duke of York, Earl of Cambridge. In 1372 he was in receipt of a retaining fee payable by the receiver-general of the duchy of Lancaster, and within a few years he had become a knight of the duke's chamber. In the early summer of 1385, Adderbury rode north in the company of the Duke as a member of the army led by King Richard II in person, in what would then become the English Invasion of Scotland of 1385. Later, in 1386 he had traveled to Portugal in the company off two other English negotiators sent to promote a treaty crucial for Lancaster's plans to invade Galicia. The resulting alliance, concluded on the 9th of May 1386 and afterwards known as the treaty of Windsor, was to have long-term importance in Anglo-Portuguese relations. Returned to England, Adderbury made preparations to return to the Iberian peninsula, this time with the army raised by his lord. It was while awaiting embarkation at Plymouth in June that he made his deposition to the constable's court, in favour of Richard Scrope, 1st Baron Scrope of Bolton, in the latter's celebrated dispute with Sir Robert Grosvenor. He remained in Spain with the Duke throughout the following year, and at some unknown date before July 1388 he was made the duke's chamberlain. In this capacity he travelled to Paris in the autumn of 1389 in order to procure safe-conducts from Charles VI for Gaunt's return home overland from Bayonne. During the 1390s he gravitated towards the royal court, however, and was several times employed on diplomatic missions by Richard II, besides serving as knight of the shire for Berkshire in 1394 and 1397.
