= Philip Wroughton =

Philip Wroughton (6 April 1846 – 7 June 1910) was an English landowner and Conservative politician who sat in the House of Commons from 1876 to 1895.

Wroughton was born at Ibstone, Buckinghamshire, the son of Philip Wroughton (1805-1862) of Woolley Park, Berkshire, and his wife Blanche Norris, daughter of John Norris of Hughenden House. His father was High Sheriff of Buckinghamshire in 1857, and left him the manors of Brightwalton, Chaddleworth, and Woolley. Wroughton was educated at Harrow School and Christ Church, Oxford. He was a Deputy Lieutenant and J.P. for Berkshire.

Wroughton was elected Member of Parliament (MP) for Berkshire in 1876 and held the seat until it was divided under the Redistribution of Seats Act 1885. He was then elected MP for the division of Abingdon, and held the seat until 1895.

== Death ==
Wroughton died at the age of 64 in Wantage in 1910.

== Family ==
Wroughton married Evelyn Mary Neeld, daughter of Sir John Neeld, 1st Baronet on 4 February 1875. They lived at Woolley Park and had eight children, including Dorothy Florence Mary Wroughton, who married Rev. Herbert Lavallin Puxley of Llethr Llestri in Carmarthenshire, Mary St Quintin Wroughton (d. 9 December 1974), who married Ellis Robins (later Lord Robins) in 1912 and Philip Musgrave Neeld Wroughton who was killed in action on 19 April 1917 during the Sinai and Palestine Campaign.

The estate passed to his son Philip, and then to his oldest daughter Dorothy and her husband, Herbert Lavallin Puxley. They held the Woolley Park estate until their elder son Michael Lavallin Puxley was 21 years old. He then inherited the estate and changed his surname to Wroughton in order to do so. He was the father of Philip Lavallin Wroughton, appointed Lord Lieutenant of Berkshire in 1995. Puxley/Wroughton was the uncle of James Puxley, appointed High Sheriff of Berkshire for 2000–2001.

Parliament of the United Kingdom
Preceded by Richard Benyon; Robert Loyd-Lindsay; John Walter	Member of Parliament for Berkshire; 1876–1885; With: Robert Loyd-Lindsay; John Walter	Constituency abolished
Preceded by John Creemer Clarke	Member of Parliament for Abingdon; 1885–1895	Succeeded by Archie Kirkman Loyd
