= Bradley Hall =

Bradley Hall may refer to:

- Bradley Hall, Bradley, a listed building in Derbyshire, England
- Bradley Hall, Standish, a listed building in Greater Manchester, England
- Brad Hall (bobsledder) (born 1990), British bobsledder
- Bradley Hall, member of Twilight Force
