= Richard Fellowes Benyon =

British politician

Richard Fellowes Benyon (17 November 1811 – 26 July 1897), born Richard Fellowes, was a British Conservative politician and civil servant.

Richard was born at Haveringland Hall in Norfolk, the third son of William Henry Fellowes of Ramsey Abbey in Huntingdonshire and his wife, Emma, sister of Richard Benyon De Beauvoir of Englefield House in Berkshire.

He inherited this latter property (16,000 acres, worth 20,004 guineas rental per annum) and its associated estates upon his uncle's death in 1854 and changed his name to Benyon.

Educated at Charterhouse and St. John's College, Cambridge, he was a member of Boodle's, Carlton and Conservative London clubs.

In 1857, he was appointed High Sheriff of Berkshire, and was the Chairman of the County's Quarter Sessions in 1864. In 1860, he was elected the Member of Parliament for Berkshire, a position he held until his resignation in 1876. He was a patron of the Society for the Suppression of Mendicity, the National Society for School Furniture, and the Oxford Diocesan Society for the Augmentation of Small Livings.

By his wife, Elizabeth Mary Clutterbuck, he had three daughters, and upon his death in 1897, his estates were inherited by his nephew, James Herbert Benyon. Meanwhile, his daughter Marion Emma had married Sir John Shelley, 9th Bt., and as a result of her cousins' own lack of sons with children, her younger son inherited Englefield in 1959. Thereby Richard Fellowes Benyon's great-grandson and eventual heir became Sir William Richard Benyon, whose son Richard Henry Ronald Benyon was MP for Newbury from 2005 to 2019 and inherited Englefield House.

Parliament of the United Kingdom
Preceded by Philip Pleydell-Bouverie; John Walter; Leicester Viney Vernon	Member of Parliament for Berkshire; 1860–1876; With: Philip Pleydell-Bouverie 1860–1865; John Walter 1860–1865, 1868–1876; Robert Loyd-Lindsay 1860–1876; Sir Charles Russell 1865–1868	Succeeded by Robert Loyd-Lindsay; John Walter; Philip Wroughton
Honorary titles
Preceded by George Barker	High Sheriff of Berkshire; 1857	Succeeded by Henry Richard Eyre
