= Henry Unton =

English diplomat (c.1557–1596)

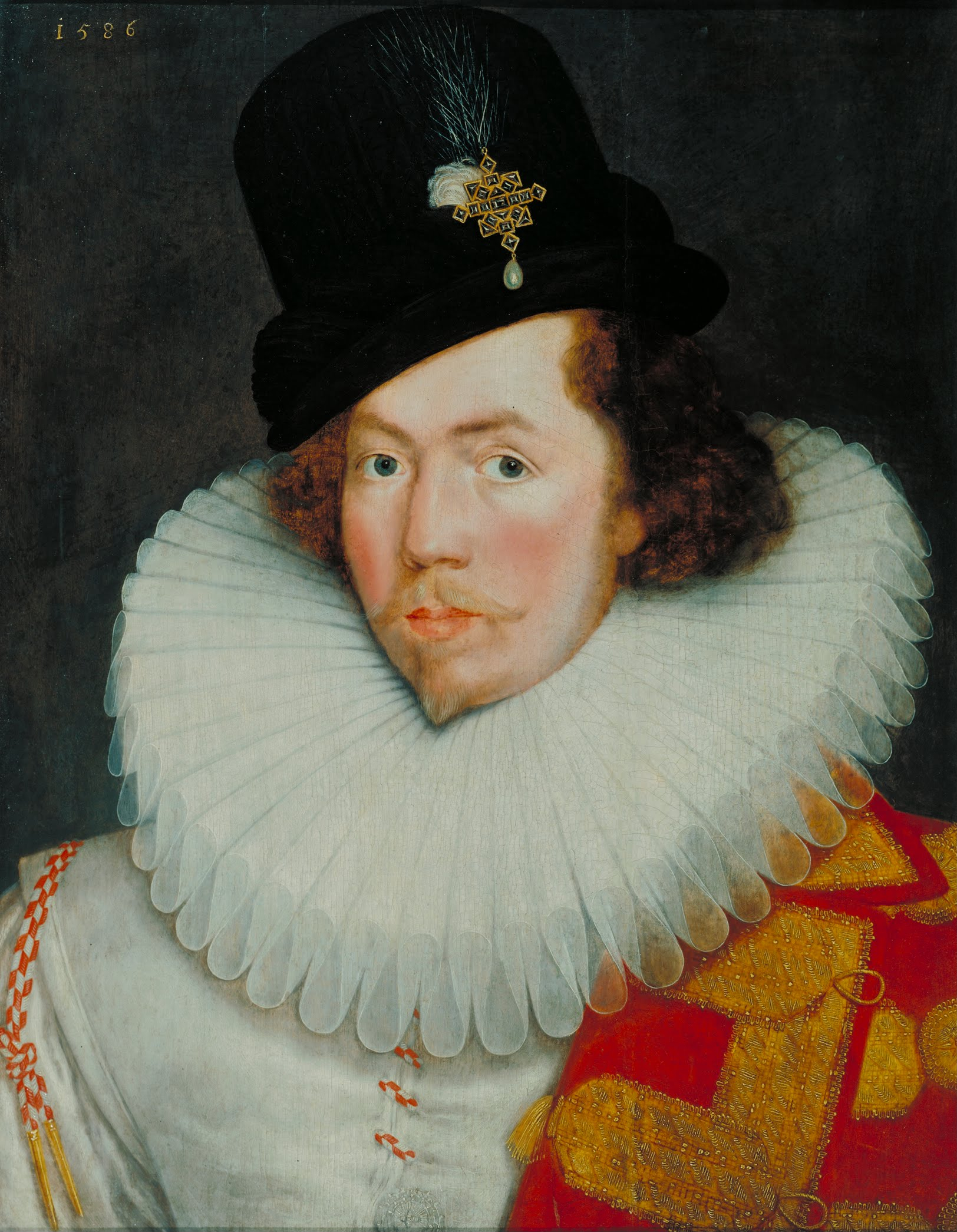
Sir Henry Unton, 1586 (artist unknown)

Sir Henry Unton (or Umpton) (c. 1557 – 23 March 1596) was an Elizabethan English diplomat.

== Life ==
Unton was born at Wychwood and was the second son of Sir Edward Unton (d. 1583) of Wadley House, near Faringdon, Berkshire (now Oxfordshire). His mother Lady Anne Seymour (d. 1588) was a daughter of the Duke of Somerset, the Lord Protector under Edward VI. His elder brother was Edward Unton, who died in 1589.

Educated at Oriel College, Oxford, Unton became one of the two members of parliament for New Woodstock in 1584. He served with the English forces in the Netherlands in 1585 and 1586, being present at the skirmish of Zutphen. In 1586 he was knighted by Robert Dudley, Earl of Leicester.

In 1591, through the good offices of the earl of Essex, Unton was sent as ambassador to Henry IV of France; he became very friendly with this king and accompanied him on a campaign in Normandy before he was recalled to England in June 1592.

Again securing a seat in 1593 in parliament as a knight of the shire for Berkshire, he lost for a short time the favour of Queen Elizabeth I, but was sent that same year as ambassador to France. He died in the French camp at La Fère on 23 March 1596, a collection of Latin verses being published in his memory at Oxford later in the year. This was edited by his chaplain, Robert Wright (1560–1643), afterwards bishop of Lichfield and Coventry.

After his death, his body was returned to England and buried at All Saints' Church in Faringdon. In his honor John Dowland composed "Sir Henry Umptons Funerall", one of the pieces in the "Lachrimae or Seven Teares" suite.

His widow, Dorothy (née Wroughton), later married to Sir George Shirley, 1st Baronet, and was known as Dame Dorothy Shirley.

== Unton Memorial Portrait ==
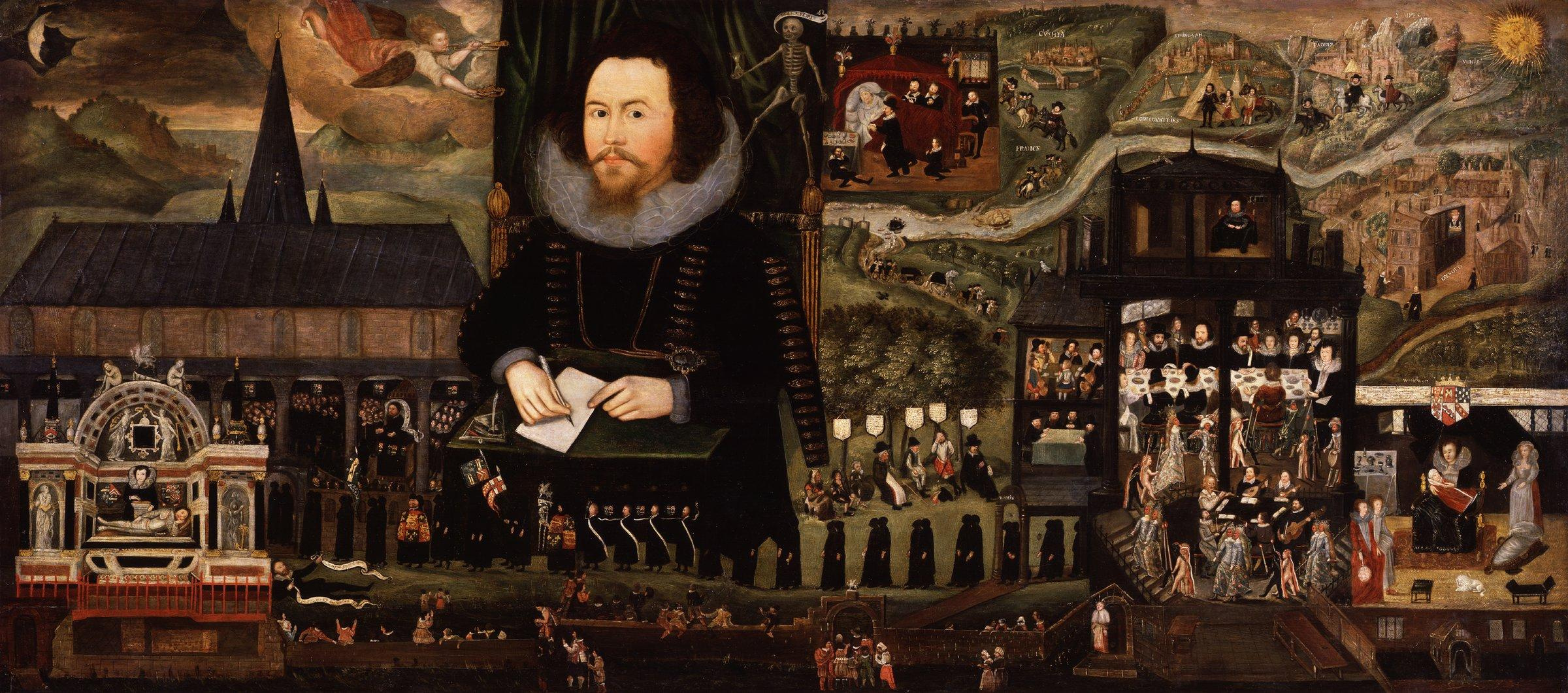
Unton Memorial Portrait, National Portrait Gallery

Shortly afterwards his widow, Dorothy Unton, commissioned an unknown artist to paint a very unusual portrait of Unton. In addition to showing the sitter as he appeared shortly before his death, the painting also uses a narrative style to show ten other important events in his life. The series begins with his birth, includes his study at Oxford, travels in Italy, campaigning in the Low Countries, his embassies in France, and ends with his impressive funeral procession.

The painting now resides at the National Portrait Gallery in London. The painting was sold by the family at an early date and its location in 1841 was unknown to the historian John Gough Nichols.
