= Edward Unton (high sheriff) =

Member of the Parliament of England

Sir Edward Unton KB (1534 – 16 September 1582) was an English politician, high sheriff and Knight of the Bath.

Edward was the eldest son of Sir Alexander Unton of Wadley House at Faringdon in Berkshire (now Oxfordshire) and his wife, Cecily, daughter of Edward Bulstrode of Hedgerley in Buckinghamshire. He inherited his father's estates in 1547. Eight years later, he married Anne, the daughter of Edward Seymour, 1st Duke of Somerset and widow of John Dudley, 2nd Earl of Warwick; together they had seven children. His eldest son Edward became MP for Berkshire (1584, 1586). His younger son Sir Henry Unton was the English ambassador to France.

He was knighted in 1559; he was appointed High Sheriff of Berkshire in 1567. Four years later (1572), he was also elected the Member of Parliament for Berkshire. He had previously been MP for Malmesbury (1554) and for Oxfordshire (1563).

He died in 1582 and was buried in Faringdon church. His monument reads: "Here lyeth Sir Edward Unton, Knight of the Noble Order of the Bathe, whoe married Anne Countess of Warwick, daughter of Edwarde Seymer Duke of Somersett and Protector of England, by whome he had ffive sonnes, whereof 3 died younge in the life of their father; Two, namelye Edwarde and Henry onely, survyved and succeeded him, the one after the other in their father's inheritance; and two daughters, Anne married to Sir Valentine Knightley, Knight, and Scissil married to John Wentworth, Esquire".

He left heavy debts, and his daughter Scissil (or Cicely) and her husband John Wentworth had considerable difficulty obtaining the lands he had bequeathed to her as a result, difficulties which ended in a lawsuit.

Political offices
Preceded by Sir Christopher Brome	High Sheriff of Berkshire; 1567–1568	Succeeded by John Fettiplace
