= Edward Unton (captain) =

Member of the Parliament of England

Edward Unton (c. 1556 – 1589) was an English landowner and MP.

He was the eldest son of Sir Edward Unton of Wadley House at Faringdon in Berkshire (now Oxfordshire) and Anne, the daughter of Edward Seymour, 1st Duke of Somerset and widow of John Dudley, 2nd Earl of Warwick. His younger brother was the diplomat, Sir Henry Unton.

He married firstly Dorothy, daughter of Sir Richard Knightley of Fawsley in Northamptonshire and, secondly, Catherine, the daughter of George Hastings, 4th Earl of Huntingdon. He had no children. In 1582 he inherited his father's estate.

In 1583 he travelled in Italy and was arrested by the Inquisition. His brother Henry paid a ransom of 10,000 crowns to secure his return to England, where Edward was obliged to sell part of his inheritance to repay his brother.

In 1584 he was elected knight of the shire for Berkshire and again in 1586.

In 1587 he went as a colonist to Munster but was recalled due to the imminent threat of the Spanish Armada. Afterwards he went as a captain on the Portuguese expedition (the English Armada) led by Sir John Norreys, but returned in bad health to die in 1589. He was succeeded by his brother Henry. His widow married Sir Walter Chetwynd of Ingestre in Staffordshire.
