= George Vansittart =

British politician

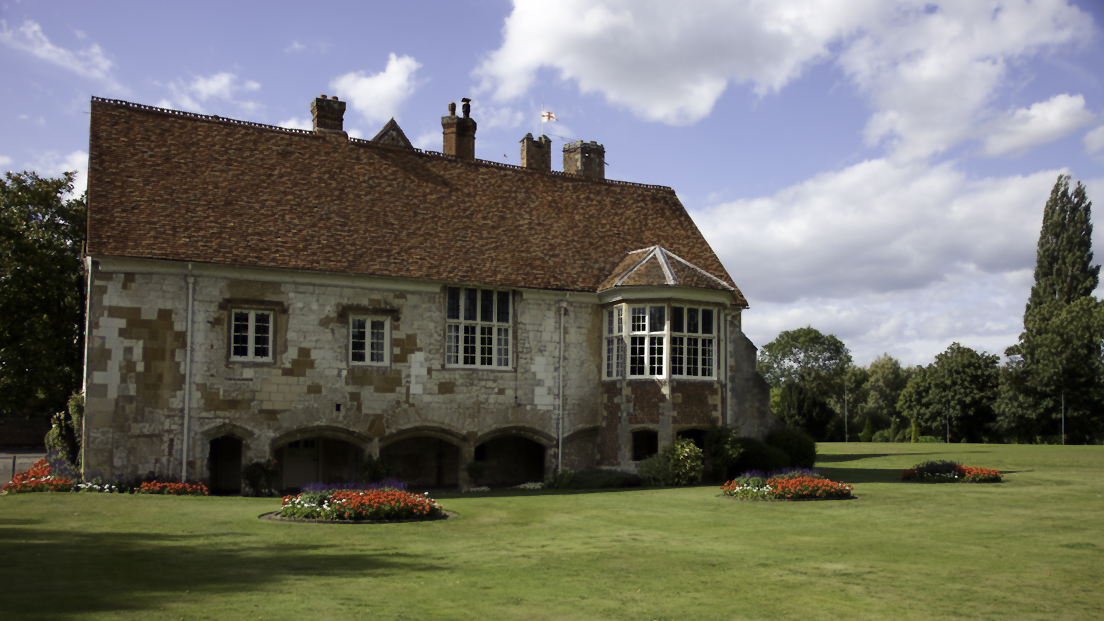
Bisham Abbey Manor House

George Vansittart (15 September 1745 – 31 January 1825) was a British politician.

He was the younger son of Arthur Vansittart of Shottesbrook and educated at Reading school. His brothers Arthur Vansittart and Henry Vansittart were also MPs.

He made his fortune as a merchant in British India and settled at Bisham Abbey on his return to England in 1776. He was the Member of Parliament (MP) for Berkshire from 1784 to 1812.

Vansittart married Sarah, daughter of Sir James Stonhouse, 11th Baronet, with whom he had five sons and three daughters. General George Henry Vansittart and Vice-Admiral Henry Vansittart (1777–1843) were their sons. His grandson, George Henry Vansittart, would also represent Berkshire in Parliament, from 1852 to 1859.
