= George Henry Vansittart =

British Army general during the Napoleonic Wars

General George Henry Vansittart (16 July 1768 – 4 February 1824) was a British Army officer during the Napoleonic Wars.

== Life ==
He was the eldest son of George Vansittart, M.P., of Bisham Abbey, Berkshire, by Sarah, daughter of the Rev. Sir James Stonhouse, 11th Baronet of Radley, Berkshire. Vice-Admiral Henry Vansittart (1777–1843) was his younger brother. Henry Vansittart (1732–1770) and Robert Vansittart were his uncles. He was educated at Winchester School, at a military academy at Strasbourg, and at Christ Church, Oxford, where he matriculated on 7 November 1785.

After obtaining a commission as ensign in the 19th Foot on 18 October 1786, he was allowed a year's leave to study military science at Brunswick and attend the Prussian manœuvres. He became lieutenant on 25 December 1787, exchanged to the 38th Foot on 12 March 1788, and obtained a company in the 18th Foot on 23 June 1790. He joined that regiment at Gibraltar, went with it to Toulon in 1793, took part in the defence, and was one of the last men to leave the place. He became major in the New South Wales Corps on 20 November 1793, and lieutenant-colonel of the 95th Foot on 21 February 1794. He took part with it in the expedition to the Cape under Sir Alured Clarke in 1795. He was made colonel in the army on 26 January 1797; but the 95th was broken up in the course of that year, and for the next three years he was on half-pay and in the Berkshire Militia, which his uncle, Colonel Arthur Vansittart, had previously commanded.

On 10 April 1801 he became lieutenant-colonel of the 68th Foot, went with it to the West Indies, and was present at the capture of St Lucia in June 1803. On 25 September he was promoted major-general, and served on the staff in England from 1804 to 1806, and in Ireland from 1806 to 1810, when he became lieutenant-general (25 July). While in command of the Oxford district he received the degree of D.C.L. on 26 June 1805. He had been given the colonelcy of the 12th Reserve Battalion on 9 July 1803, and was transferred to the 1st Garrison Battalion on 25 February 1805. The colours of this battalion were afterwards presented to him, and now hang in the great hall in Bisham Abbey. He became general on 19 July 1821, and died on 4 February 1824.

On 29 October 1818 he had married Anna Maria, daughter and coheiress of Thomas Copson of Sheppey Hall, Leicestershire. She survived him, with one son, George Henry Vansittart the younger (1823–1885), and a second son, Augustus Arthur Vansittart (1824–1882), who was born posthumously. There is a portrait of him in uniform, by Sir George Hayter, at Bisham Abbey. A mourning brooch, presumably commissioned by his family, inscribed with details of his birth and death and containing a lock of his hair appeared on Episode 12 of Season 16 of Pawn Stars in September, 2019.

== Sources ==
- Based on public domain Dictionary of National Biography entry
