= Dunch =

Dunch is a surname. Notable people with the surname include:

- Edmund Dunch (Elizabethan) (1551–1623), English MP and High Sheriff
- Edmund Dunch (Roundhead) (1602–1678), English Member of Parliament
- Edmund Dunch (Whig) (1657–1719), Master of the Royal Household to Queen Anne, British Member of Parliament
- Hungerford Dunch (1639–1680), English politician, member of the House of Commons in 1660 and from 1679 to 1680
- John Dunch (1630–1668), English politician who sat in the House of Commons between 1654 and 1659
- Samuel Dunch (1593–1668), English politician who sat in the House of Commons in 1621 and 1653
- Sir William Dunch (1578–1611), English politician during the reign of King James I
- William Dunch (1508–1597) (1508–1597), English politician

== See also ==
- Dench
- Dhunche
- Dunce
