= William Dunch =

William Dunch may refer to:

- William Dunch (1508–1597), English politician
- Sir William Dunch (1578–1611), English politician
