= Bartholomew Tipping =

Bartholomew Tipping may refer to:

- Bartholomew Tipping IV (1648–1718), High Sheriff of Berkshire
- Bartholomew Tipping VII (1735–1798), High Sheriff of Berkshire
