= Edmund Dunch =

Edmund Dunch may refer to:

- Sir Edmund Dunch (Elizabethan) (1551–1623), English politician, MP for Wallingford, then Berkshire in 1571 and later for Wootton Bassett (1584–1585)
- Edmund Dunch (Roundhead) (1602–1678), English Member of Parliament who supported the Parliamentary
- Edmund Dunch (Whig) (1677–1719), English politician and courtier
