= Joseph Cox =

Joseph or Joe Cox may refer to:

- Joe Cox (cricketer) (1886–1971), English cricketer
- Joe Cox (American football) (born 1986), American football player
- Joe Cox (singer), English singer and contestant on the eighth and ninth series of The X Factor
- Joseph Buford Cox (1905–2002), inventor
- Joseph Winston Cox (1875–1939), American federal judge
- Joseph Richard Cox (1852–1934), Member of Parliament for East Clare, 1885–1892
- Joseph Cox (footballer) (born 1994), Panamanian footballer
- Joseph Mason Cox (1763–1818), English physician
- Joseph N. Cox, suspected murderer of Harry and Harriette Moore
- Joseph Cox (high sheriff) (1697–1753), High Sheriff of Berkshire

== See also ==
- Jo Cox (disambiguation)
