= Baron Palmer =

Barony in the Peerage of the United Kingdom

Baron Palmer, of Reading in the County of Berkshire, is a title in the Peerage of the United Kingdom. It was created in 1933 for the businessman and patron of music, Sir Ernest Palmer, 1st Baronet. He had already been created a baronet, of Grosvenor Crescent in the City of Westminster, in the Baronetage of the United Kingdom on 26 January 1916. The Palmer family had made its fortune from their ownership of the firm of Huntley & Palmers, biscuit manufacturers, of Reading. As of 2023 the titles are held by the first Baron's great-great-grandson, the fifth Baron, who succeeded his father in 2023.

The family seat is Manderston, near Duns, Berwickshire.

== Baron Palmer (1933) ==
- (Samuel) Ernest Palmer, 1st Baron Palmer (1858–1948)
- (Ernest) Cecil Nottage Palmer, 2nd Baron Palmer (1882–1950)
- Raymond Cecil Palmer, 3rd Baron Palmer (1916–1990)
- Adrian Bailie Nottage Palmer, 4th Baron Palmer (1951–2023)
- Hugo Bailie Rohan Palmer, 5th Baron Palmer (b. 1980)

The heir apparent is the present holder's son, the Hon. Ernest Bailie Rohan Palmer (b. 2019).

=== Male-line family tree ===
Male-line family tree, Barons Palmer

Ernest Palmer; 1st Baron Palmer; 1858–1948
Cecil Palmer; 2nd Baron Palmer; 1882–1950
Raymond Palmer; 3rd Baron Palmer; 1916–1990	Hon. Sir Gordon Palmer; 1918–1989
Adrian Palmer; 4th Baron Palmer; 1951–2023
Hugo Palmer; 5th Baron Palmer born 1980
Hon. Ernest Palmer born 2019

== Arms ==
Coat of arms of Baron Palmer
Crest Upon a mount Vert in front of a palm tree Proper three escallops fessways Or. Escutcheon Per saltire Azure and Gules two palmers'staves in saltire between four escallops Or. Supporters On either side a palmer supporting with the exterior hand a palmer's staff Proper. Motto Per Crucem Ad Palmam (Through The Cross To The Palm)

== See also ==
- Palmer Baronets
