= Chaddleworth =

Coordinates: 51°29′46″N 1°24′18″W

- Village
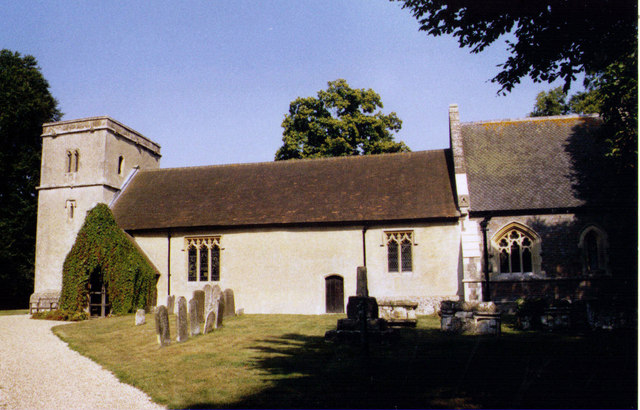
- St Andrew's Church

- Location within Berkshire
- Area: 13.71 km^{2} (5.29 sq mi)
- Population: 499 (2011 census)
  - Density: 36/km^{2} (93/sq mi)
- OS grid reference: SU4177
- Unitary authority: West Berkshire
- Ceremonial county: Berkshire
- Region: South East
- Country: England
- Sovereign state: United Kingdom
- Post town: Newbury
- Postcode district: RG20
- Dialling code: 01488
- Police: Thames Valley
- Fire: Royal Berkshire
- Ambulance: South Central
- UK Parliament: Newbury

Chaddleworth is a village and civil parish in the English county of Berkshire.

== Geography ==
The village of Chaddleworth lies below the southern slopes of the Berkshire Downs, just east of the A338 road, which runs between Hungerford and Wantage to form the western parish boundary. The south-east corner of the village is called Nodmore and the hamlet of Southend sits only a mile to the north-east. In the north of the parish is Woolley and in the south is Poughley, both barely hamlets now. Woolley Down rises above the former. The parish mostly consists of farmland, with some scattered woodland such as Nine Acre Wood, Spray Wood, Down Copse, Rooksnest Copse and Bassdown Copse. The West Berkshire Golf Course, on Buckham Hill, and the northern edge of RAF Welford are in Poughley. Major private houses include Chaddleworth House on Chaddleworth Mount Lane; Woolley House at Woolley Park; Oak Ash House off School Lane; and the old Priory on Hangmans Stone Lane.

== Landmarks and amenities ==
Chaddleworth has a primary school, a pub and a full-time resident community. The parish church sits in the western portion of the village adjoining the manor house, Chaddleworth House. A second manor is centred on Woolley Park within its own deer park. Woolley is the site of a deserted medieval village. The house was the home of the Tipping family for many generations — including Bartholomew Tipping IV and Bartholomew Tipping VII, both High Sheriff of Berkshire — and now of their descendants, the Wroughtons. The current owner is Mrs Kirsten Lloyd, eldest daughter of the late Lord Lieutenant of Berkshire, Sir Philip Lavallin Wroughton. Poughley has the remains of a medieval priory. Chaddleworth's pub, The Ibex, has won several awards including South East Entertainment Pub of the Year 2010 and West Berks CAMRA Community Pub 2009. Chaddleworth has a local microbrewery, called the Indigenous Brewery, located at Peacock Cottage on Main Street.

== Transport ==
Bus travel from Newbury is provided by service 107.

== Traditional law by custom ==
Chaddleworth before the Law of Property Act 1925 had tenants who held land by copyhold and enjoyed an unusual legal practice associated with widows' rights known as Free Bench. The rights to copyhold land inheritance from a husband were usually forfeited if his widow remarried. However, in Chaddleworth the steward of the manor house was obliged to reinstate the rights if she rode into the manor court backwards on a black ram, whilst at the same time reciting a particular set of bizarre lines ending in a request for their restoration.

== Demography ==
2011 Published Statistics: Population, home ownership and extracts from Physical Environment, surveyed in 2005
| Output area | Homes owned outright | Owned with a loan | Socially rented | Privately rented | Other | km^{2} roads | km^{2} water | km^{2} domestic gardens | Usual residents | km^{2} |
|---|---|---|---|---|---|---|---|---|---|---|
| Civil parish | 39 | 65 | 41 | 35 | 9 | 0.131 | 0.006 | 0.147 | 499 | 13.71 |
