= Robert Pye =

Robert Pye may refer to:

- Sir Robert Pye (Royalist) (1585–1662), English courtier, administrator and politician, MP between 1621 and 1629
- Sir Robert Pye (Roundhead) (c. 1620 – 1701), Parliamentarian son of the Royalist, MP at various times between 1640 and 1660

Robert pye also found out how he could determine the circumference

of a circle
