= High Sheriff of Berkshire =

Ceremonial officer of the English county of Berkshire

The High Sheriff of Berkshire, in common with other counties, was originally the King's representative on taxation upholding the law in Saxon times. The word Sheriff evolved from 'shire-reeve'.

The title of High Sheriff is therefore much older than the other crown appointment, the Lord Lieutenant of Berkshire, which came about after 1545. Between 1248 and 1566, Berkshire and Oxfordshire formed a joint shrievalty (apart from a brief period in 1258/1259). See High Sheriff of Oxfordshire.

Unlike the Lord Lieutenant of Berkshire, which is generally held from appointment until the holder's death or incapacity, the title of High Sheriff is appointed / reappointed annually. The High Sheriff is assisted by an Under-Sheriff of Berkshire.

== List of High Sheriffs of Berkshire ==
- Before 1066: Godric, first recorded Sheriff of Berkshire (killed 1066)
- Soon after 1066 Froger
- after 1066 Henry de Ferrers
- 1071: Robert D'Oyly
- 1086: Aiulf
- 1094: Gilbert de Bretville
- 1097: Hugh of Buckland
- 1105: Aubrey de Vere
- 1110: Hugh of Buckland
- 1112: Alfred
- 1118: Ralph
- 1119: William de Buckland
- 1126: John Belet
- 1126: Baldwin FitzClarus
- 1129: Anselm, Viscount of Rouen
- Michaelmas 1129: William de Pont de l'Arche
- 1153: Henry de Oxford
- 1154: Jordan de Podiis
- 1154: William de Pontearch
- Michaelmas 1154: Henry de Oxford
- Michaelmas 1155: Richard de Camville
- 1156: Adam the Sheriff (probably Adam de Catmore)
- Michaelmas 1157: Gilbert de Pinkney (de Pinchigen)
- 1159: Gilbert de Pinkney
- 1159: William de Pinchigen
- 1160: Gilbert de Pinkney
- Christmas 1160: Adam de Catmore
- 1161: Richard Lucy
- 1162-1170: Adam de Catmer
- Easter 1170-1179: Hugh de Buckland/de Bockland
- Michaelmas 1176: Hugh de St German
- 1179-1187: Hugh de St German
- 1189: Roger FitzRenfrick
- Michaelmas 1186–1189: Roger fitzReinfrid
- Michaelmas 1189: Robert de la Mare
- Michaelmas 1190: William Brewer
- Michaelmas 1193: William Brewer and Philip FitzRobert
- Michaelmas 1194: Philip FitzRobert
- Michaelmas 1197: Stephen of Thornham
- Easter 1199: Nicholas de Kennet
- Michaelmas 1200: Fulk de Cantilupe
- Easter 1201: William Brewer
- 20 May 1202: Hubert de Burgh
- Michaelmas 1204–1215: John de Wiggenholt
- Michaelmas 1217: Richard (later Earl of Cornwall)
- 18 April 1220: Henry de Scaccario
- Easter 1226: Hugh le Despenser
- 12 September 1226: Hugh of Bath
- 22 August 1227: Philip d'Aubigny
  - Michaelmas 1228: Hugh of Bath
  - Michaelmas 1229: Henry of Bath
- 13 November 1229: Henry de Scaccario
- 14 April 1232: Alexander de Swerford, Archdeacon of Shropshire
- 10 May 1232: John Bonet
- 6 July 1232: Peter de Rivaux
- Michaelmas 1232: Robert de Mapledurham
- 6 May 1233: William de Culworth
- 2 May 1234: Robert de Mapledurham
- 22 May 1234: Engelard de Cigogné
- 18 April 1236: Robert Brend
- 7 June 1237: Simon de Lewknor
- 1238: Hugh le Despenser
- Michaelmas 1244–1248: Nicholas or Alan de Farnham

=== 1248–1566 ===
See High Sheriff of Berkshire and Oxfordshire for incumbents during this period. (From 3 November 1258 to Michaelmas 1259, Nicholas de Hendred was sheriff for Berkshire only.)

1350 'John de Alveton, Sheriff of Berks'., replies that he has delivered to William de Emeldon, clerk, all the chattels of Geoffrey de Weston and half his lands, as in the extent drawn up in Geoffrey's absence.

=== 1567–1599 ===
- 18 November 1567: Sir Edward Unton, of Wadley
- 18 November 1568: John Fettiplace, of Besselsleigh, Berkshire
- 12 November 1569: William Forster, of Aldermaston, Berkshire
- 13 November 1570: William Dunch, of Little Wittenham, Berkshire
- 14 November 1571: John Winchcombe, of Bucklebury and Thatcham, Berkshire
- 13 November 1572: Sir Henry Neville, of Billingbear, Berkshire
- 10 November 1573: Thomas Essex
- 15 November 1574: Richard Lovelace
- 15 November 1575: Anthony Brydges
- 13 November 1576: Thomas Parry, of Hampstead Marshall
- 27 November 1577: John Fettiplace
- 17 November 1578: Thomas Stafford
- 23 November 1579: Thomas Stephens
- 21 November 1580: Humphrey Forster, of Aldermaston, Berkshire
- 27 November 1581: Thomas Bullock
- 5 December 1582: Thomas Reade
- 25 November 1583: Michael Molyns, of Mackney and Clapcot, Berkshire
- 19 November 1584: Basil Fettiplace
- 22 November 1585: Edmund Fettiplace
- 14 November 1586: Christopher Lytcot
- Michaelmas 1587: Edward Smith
- 4 December 1587: Edmund Dunch, of Little Wittenham, Berkshire
- 25 November 1588: Thomas Parry, of Hampstead Marshall
- 24 November 1589: Thomas Dolman
- 24 November 1590: John Latton
- 25 November 1591: Richard Warde
- 16 November 1592: Francis Winchcombe
- 1592: Edmund Dunch, of Little Wittenham, Berkshire
- 26 November 1593: Sir Humphrey Forster
- 21 November 1594: Richard Hyde
- 27 November 1595: Henry Neville, of Billingbear, Waltham St Lawrence
- 22 November 1596: Edmund Wiseman
- 25 November 1597: Sir Christopher Lytcot
- 28 November 1598: Sir Henry Poole
- 2 December 1599: Thomas Reade

=== 1600–1699 ===
- 24 November 1600: Samuel Backhouse, of Swallowfield
- 2 December 1601: Sir John Norreys
- 7 December 1602: Sir Edmund Fettiplace
- 1 December 1603: Edmund Dunch, of Little Wittenham, Berkshire
- 5 November 1604: Anthony Blagrave, of Bulmershe Court, Sonning
- 2 February 1606: Thomas Reade
- 17 November 1606: William Stonehouse
- 9 November 1607: Francis Winchcombe
- 12 November 1608: Sir William Forster
- 1609: Sir Anthony Barker, of the Rectory, Sonning
- 6 November 1610: Sir Richard Lovelace, of Lady Place, Hurley
- 1611: Sir Thomas Vachell
- 1612: Thomas Hinton
- 1613: Charles Wiseman
- 1614: John Ayshcombe
- 6 November 1615: Sir William Yonge
- 11 November 1616: William Standen
- 6 November 1617: Sir Valentine Knightley
- 9 November 1618: Sir John Catcher, of Binfield
- 1619: Humphrey Forster
- 6 November 1620: Sir Gabriel Pile
- 1621: John Winchcombe
- 7 November 1622: John Marriott
- 1623: William Hyde
- 1624: Sir John Blagrave
- 1625: Sir John Darell, 1st Baronet
- 1626: Sir Edward Clarke, of Ardington
- 4 November 1627: George Wilmott
- 1628: Sir Edward Yate, 1st Baronet
- 1629: Samuel Dunch, of Sparsholt
- 7 November 1630: John Fettiplace, of Childrey
- 1631: Sir Henry Sambourne
- 1632: Henry Poole
- 10 November 1633: Edmund Dunch
- 5 November 1634: Humphrey Dolman
- 1635: William Barker
- 3 October 1636: Sir Richard Harrison, of Hurst
- 10 September 1637: Sir George Stonhouse, 3rd Baronet
- 4 November 1638: Humphrey Hyde, of Sutton Wick
- 1639: George Purefoy
- 1640: Peregrine Hoby, of Bisham Abbey, Berkshire
- 1641: Tanfield Vachell
- 1643: Richard Neville, of Billingbear, Binfield, Berkshire
- 30 December 1643: Sir Francis Pile, 2nd Baronet
- 1645: Anthony Blagrave
- 1 December 1646: John Southby, of Carswell Manor
- 1647: William Trumbull
- 10 January 1648: William Standen
- 23 November 1648: William Wollascott
- 7 November 1649: William Raynton
- November 1650: John Allen, of Basildon
- 4 November 1651: Sir Henry Henn, 1st Baronet, of Foliejon, Winkfield
- 12 November 1652: John Rean
- 21 December 1652: Richard Dew
- 10 November 1653: Dowse Fuller
- 25 November 1653: William Backhouse
- 1654: Sir George Pratt, 2nd Baronet
- 1655: William Stroude
- 1656: William Bigg
- 1657: Thomas Rich
- 1658: Oliver Pleydell
- 5 November 1660: Sir Thomas Draper, 1st Baronet
- 1661: Thomas Garrard
- 1662: George Purefoy
- 1663: Sir Compton Reade, 1st Baronet
- 1664: Sir William Backhouse, 1st Baronet
- 12 November 1665: Basil Brent
- 7 November 1666: Philip Weston
- 6 November 1667: Sir John Fettiplace, 1st Baronet
- 6 November 1668: Edmund Wiseman
- 11 November 1669: John Ashcombe
- 3 November 1670: Henry Partridge
- 11 January 1670: (O.S.): John Plummer, of Windsor
- 9 November 1671: William Giffard or Gifford
- 3 December 1671: Daniel Hayne or Haynes
- 10 December 1671: John Loder
- 1671: Thomas Vachell
- 11 November 1672: John Sherwood
- 12 November 1673: Thomas Marten (Philip Jemmett rendered account for the entire year)
- 5 November 1674: Thomas Marten or Martyn
- 11 November 1674: Robert Breden
- 1674: Richard Pocock
- 15 November 1675: John Breedon, of Bere Court, Pangbourne
- 10 November 1676: Major Dunch
- 15 November 1677: Richard Jennings
- 14 November 1678: Richard Palmer
- 13 November 1679: Sir William Kendrick, 1st Baronet
- 25 November 1679: John Hippesley
- 4 November 1680: Sir William Kendrick, 1st Baronet
- 10 November 1681: Charles Garrard or Garret
- 13 November 1682: John Wightwick or Whitwicke
- 12 November 1683: David Bigg
- 20 November 1684: Daniel Haynes
- 30 November 1685: Edmund Wiseman, the younger
- 25 November 1686: Richard Lybb
- 20 December 1686: Samuel Jones, of Lyndsham
- 1686: Henry Alexander
- 5 December 1687: Thomas Wollascott
- 8 November 1688: Robert Lee, of Binfield
- 3 December 1688: James Paule, of Bray
- 18 November 1689: John Blandy
- 27 November 1690: Bartholomew Tipping IV
- 14 December 1691: Edward Sherwood
- 17 November 1692: John Archer
- 16 November 1693: Sebastian Lyford
- 6 December 1694: Thomas Harwood
- 5 November 1695: Richard Southby
- 3 December 1696: Tanfield Vachell, of Coley, Reading
- 16 December 1697: John Bigg
- 22 December 1698: John Head, of Langleys, Hampstead Norris
- 20 November 1699: George Blagrave

=== 1700–1799 ===
- 28 November 1700: John Breedon III
- 1 January 1702 (O.S.): Richard Southby, of Carswell, Buckland
- 12 January 1702 : Richard Southby, the younger
- 3 December 1702: John Hillersden, of Midgham Park
- 2 December 1703: Sir Humphrey Forster, of Aldermaston, Berkshire
- 21 December 1704: Sir Thomas Dolman
- 3 December 1705: John Wildman, of Becket House, Shrivenham
- 14 November 1706: Henry Kings(e)mill, of Sandleford
- 20 November 1707: Felix Calvert, of Marcham
- 25 November 1708: Robert Packer, of Shellingford and Donnington
- 1 December 1709: William Waterman
- 24 November 1710: Gregory Geering
- 13 December 1711: John Blandy
- 11 December 1712: Anthony Blagrave, of Southcot, Reading
- 30 November 1713: Benjamin Child
- 16 November 1714: Clement Kent, of Goring, Oxfordshire and Thatcham, Berkshire
- 22 November 1715: Richard Lyford, of Rush Deane
- 28 April 1716: Richard Curtis
- 12 November 1716: John Dodson, of Cookham
- 21 December 1717: Edward Richards, of Compton
- 6 January 1719: Richard Thompson, of Coley, Reading
- 3 December 1719: William Barker, of Caversham
- 3 January 1721: Reginald Fellowe, of Reading
- 14 December 1721: Walter Knight, of Ruscombe
- 11 December 1722: Walter Tyrrell, of Stanford in the Vale
- 7 January 1724: Sir John Rush
- 10 December 1724: Paul Colton
- 22 December 1724: Thomas Parr
- 13 January 1726: William Bigg, of Stanford
- 29 November 1726: Edward Riggs, of Binfield
- 16 December 1727: Richard Head, of Hampstead Norris
- 18 December 1728: Edward Clarke, of Ardington
- 18 December 1729: William Noake
- 14 December 1730: William Hawkins
- 9 December 1731: Arthur Vansittart
- 27 January 1732: John Watts, of Reading
- 14 December 1732: Edward Sherwood
- 20 December 1733: Thomas Barker
- 19 December 1734: Henry Tompkins
- 18 December 1735: Robert Gayer, of Stoke Park
- 19 December 1737: Matthew Weymondesould
- 12 January 1738: Joseph Cox, of Stanford in the Vale
- 21 December 1738: William Trumbull
- 27 December 1739: Robert Lee, of Binfield
- 24 December 1740: Benjamin Griffin
- 31 December 1741: Henry Lanoy Hunter
- 16 December 1742: John Blandy, of Kingston Bagpuze
- 5 January 1744: Sir Thomas Head, of Langley
- 10 January 1745: Samuel Beaver, of Stratfield Mortimer
- 16 January 1746: Richard Tonson, of Water Oakeley
- 12 February 1747: Daniel Bunce, of Longworth
- 14 January 1748: Lawrence Head Osgood, of Winterborne
- 11 January 1749: Wilmot Baker, of Moulsford
- 17 January 1750: John Allett, of Old Windsor
- 6 December 1750: Alexander Walker, of Swallowfield
- 14 January 1752: John Price, of Ham
- 7 February 1753: Humphrey Adams, of New Windsor
- 31 January 1754: Richard Fuller, of Fitz Harris
- 29 January 1755: Sir Mark Stuart Pleydell, 1st Baronet, of Coleshill
- 27 January 1756: Sir Thomas Reeve, of New Windsor
- 4 February 1757: William Reynolds, of Binfield
- 27 January 1758: Samuel Bowes, of Binfield
- 2 February 1759: Henry Plant, of Shinfield
- 1 February 1760: William Brotherton, of Pusey
- 16 February 1760: Charles Wymondesold, of Lockinge
- 28 January 1761: James Theobald, of Waltham Place
- 15 February 1762: John Blagrave, of Southcot
- 4 February 1763: John Hippisley, of Lambourne
- 10 February 1764: John Walter, of Farley Hill
- 1 February 1765: John Archer, of Wellford
- 17 February 1766: Sir William East, 1st Baronet, of Hall Place, Hurley
- 13 February 1767: Charles Pye, of Wadley
- 15 January 1768: William Price, of Charlton
- 27 January 1769: John Cooke, of Frilsham
- 9 February 1770: John Mount
- 6 February 1771: Sir William Stonhouse, 9th Baronet, of Radley
- 17 February 1772: Stanlake Batson, of Winkfield
- 8 February 1773: Jeremiah Crutchley, of Sunninghill Park
- 7 February 1774: John Mayor, of Abingdon
- 6 February 1775: Bartholomew Price, of East Challow
- 5 February 1776: Hugh Watts, of Lovell's Hill
- 31 January 1777: Henry Hall, of Cookham
- 28 January 1778: Clement Saxton, of Caldecot
- 1 February 1779: Richard Smith, of Chilton Lodge, Hungerford
- 2 February 1780: John Grant, of White Waltham
- 5 February 1781: Edward Loveden Loveden, of Buscot Park
- Michaelmas 1781: Charles Hall
- 10 February 1783: Sir James Patey, of Reading
- 9 February 1784: Charles Dalbiac, of Hungerford Park
- 7 February 1785: Francis Robson, of Tubney
- 18 February 1785: Edward Thornhill, of Kingston Lisle
- 13 February 1786: William Poyntz, of Midgham
- 12 February 1787: William Byam Martin, of White Knights
- 8 February 1788: William Brummell, of Donnington
- 29 April 1789: Edward Golding, of Maiden Earley
- 29 January 1790: Alexander Cobham, of Shinfield Place
- 4 February 1791: Timothy Hare Earle, of Swallowfield Place
- 3 February 1792: John Blagrave, of Calcot Place
- 6 February 1793: Thomas Goodlake, of Barton Regis
- 27 February 1793: Edward Martin Atkins, of Kingston Lisle
- 5 February 1794: Edward Stephenson, of Farley Hill
- 11 February 1795: William Thoyts, of Sulhampstead
- 5 February 1796: Michael Anthony, of Shippon
- 22 February 1797: Bartholomew Tipping VII, of Woolley
- 7 February 1798: Richard Palmer, of Hurst
- 1 February 1799: James Sibbald, of Sunninghill

=== 1800–1899 ===
- 5 February 1800: Sir John Coxe Hippisley, 1st Baronet, of Warfield Grove
- 11 February 1801: Onesiphorus Elliott Elliott, of Binfield
- 3 February 1802: Hon. Thomas Windsor, of Braywick
- 3 February 1803: Daniel Agace, of Winkfield
- 1 February 1804: Richard Mathews, of Wargrave
- 1804: Nicholas Matthews
- 6 February 1805: Sir Morris Ximenes, of Bear Place
- 1 February 1806: John Inglebert Libenrood, of Tilehurst
- 4 February 1807: William Blane, of Wingfield Park
- 11 February 1807: George Henry Crutchley, of Sunninghill Park
- 3 February 1808: William Congreve, of Aldermaston
- 6 February 1809: Sir Thomas Theophilus Metcalfe, 1st Baronet, of Fernhill
- 31 January 1810: Peter Green, of Cookham
- 8 February 1811: William Wiseman Clarke, of Ardington
- 24 January 1812: George Elwes, of Marcham
- 10 February 1813: William Yarnton Mills, of Wadley
- 4 February 1814: John Robert Hopkins, of Tidmarsh
- 13 February 1815: John Willes, of Hungerford Park
- 12 February 1816: Richard Powlett Wrighte Benyon, of Englefield
- 12 February 1817: William Stone, of Englefield
- 24 January 1818: Robert Palmer, of Holme Park
- 10 February 1819: John Sawyer, of Heywood Lodge
- 12 February 1820: Timothy Hare Altabon Earle, of Swallowfield Place
- 6 February 1821: Hon. Frederick West, of Culham
- 4 February 1822: Sir Gilbert East, 2nd Baronet, of Hall Place, Maidenhead
- 31 January 1823: Henry Piper Sperling, of Park Place
- 31 January 1824: Sir Charles Saxton, 2nd Baronet, of Circourt
- 2 February 1825: Ebenezer Fuller Maitland, of Shinfield
- 30 January 1826: William Mount, of Wasing Place, Thatcham, Berkshire
- 5 February 1827: Thomas Duffield, of Marcham Park
- 13 February 1828: Thomas Bowles, of Milton Hill
- 11 February 1829: George Henry Cherry, of Denford
- 2 February 1830: John Walter, of Bearwood House
- 31 January 1831: Charles Eyston, of East Hendred
- 6 February 1832: Thomas Mills Goodlake, of Wadley House
- 4 February 1833: East George Clayton East, of Hall Place
- 3 February 1834: Charles Eyre, of Welford Park
- 7 February 1835: Bartholomew Wroughton, of Woolley Park
- 3 February 1836: William Bennett, of Faringdon House
- 28 January 1837: James Wheble, of Woodley Lodge
- 1 February 1838: Winchcombe Henry Howard Hartley, of Bucklebury Cottage
- 4 February 1839: Mortimer George Thoyts, of Sulhamstead House
- 29 January 1840: Henry Hippisley, of Lambourn Place
- 5 February 1841: John Jesse Bulkeley, of Linden Hill
- 2 February 1842: Henry Mill Bunbury, of Marlston House
- 1 February 1843: Sir Robert Throckmorton, 8th Baronet, of Buckland House
- 31 January 1844: Edwin Martin Atkins, of Kingston Lisle
- 3 February 1845: John Bligh Monck, of Coley Park
- 30 January 1846: William Stephens, of Prospect Park
- 4 February 1847: William Henry Stone, of Streatley House
- 11 February 1848: John Hopkins, of Tidmarsh
- 13 February 1849: Robert Gibson, of Sandhurst Lodge
- 5 February 1850: Robert Allfrey, of Wokefield Park
- 11 February 1851: Daniel Higford Duvall Burr, of Aldermaston Park
- 2 February 1852: John Samuel Bowles, of Milton Hill
- 7 February 1853: Head Pottinger Best, of Donnington Grove
- 30 January 1854: James Joseph Wheble, of Bulmershe Court
- 8 February 1855: Henry Elwes, of Marcham Park
- 30 January 1856: George Barker, of Stanlake House
- 2 February 1857: Richard Fellowes Benyon, of Englefield Park
- 3 February 1858: Henry Richard Eyre, of Shaw Place
- 2 February 1859: Charles Philip Duffield, of Marcham Park
- 23 January 1860: Sir Claudius Stephen Paul Hunter, 2nd Baronet, of Mortimer, near Reading
- 4 February 1861: Henry Lannoy Hunter, of Beech Hill, near Reading
- 5 February 1862: Robert Campbell, of Buscot Park, near Lechlade
- 3 February 1863: James Blyth, of Woolhampton House, near Newbury
- 3 February 1864: Richard Hall Say, of Oakley Court, near Windsor
- 4 February 1865: Benjamin Buck Greene, of Midgham House, near Newbury
- 3 February 1866: John Blandy-Jenkins, of Kingston Bagpuize House, Kingston Bagpuize
- 2 February 1867: Thomas Hargreaves, of Arborfield Hall
- 30 January 1868: Alexander William Cobham, of Leighton Park, Reading
- 4 February 1869: Henry Tucker, of Bourton House, Shrivenham
- 5 February 1870: John Henry Blagrave, of Calcot Park, Tilehurst
- 8 February 1871: George Charles Cherry of Denford House, Hungerford
- 5 February 1872: Sir Nicholas William Throckmorton, 9th Baronet, of Buckland House
- 5 February 1873: John Alves Arbuthnot, of Cowarth Park, Old Windsor
- 2 February 1874: William Hew Dunn, of Standen Manor, Hungerford
- 4 February 1875: Albert Richard Tull of Crookham House, Thatcham, near Newbury
- 12 February 1876: John Hargreaves, of Maiden Erleigh, near Reading
- 7 February 1877: William George Mount, of Wasing Place, near Reading
- 22 February 1878: Arthur Smith, of The Grotto, Basildon, near Reading
- 22 February 1879: Edward Hamilton, of Charters, Sunningdale, Staines
- 26 February 1880: Robert Burn Blyth, of Woolhampton, near Reading
- 2 March 1881: Goodrich Holmesdale Allfrey, of Wokefield Park
- 27 February 1882: Colonel William Gray of Farley Hall, near Reading
- 3 March 1883: William Richard Mortimer Thoyts, of Sulhamstead House, near Reading
- 4 March 1884: Charles Stephens, of Woodley Hill, near Reading
- 5 March 1885: Sydney Alers Hankey, of Heathlands House, Wokingham
- 8 March 1886: Victor William Henry Bates Van De Weyer, of Kingston Lisle, near Wantage
- 7 March 1887: Sir Richard Francis Sutton, 5th Baronet, of Benham House, near Newbury
- 17 March 1888: Henry Waring, of Beenham House, Reading
- 6 April 1889: John William Rhodes, of Hennerton, Henley-on-Thames
- 21 March 1890: Higford Higford, of Aldermaston Park, Heading
- 20 March 1891: Arthur Harvey Thursby, of Culverlands, Burghfield
- 16 March 1892: Charles Durant Kemp-Welch, of Broadlands, Ascot
- 15 March 1893: William Lansdowne Beale, of Manor House, Waltham St. Lawrence
- 10 March 1894: Francis Ricardo, of the Friary, Old Windsor
- 8 March 1895: Sir William Farmer, of Cowarth Park, Sunningdale
- 6 March 1896: George Rodie Thompson, of Lynwood, Sunningdale, Ascot
- 26 February 1897: Henry Gold, of Hedsor, Maidenhead
- 7 March 1898: Charles Edward Keyser, of Aldermaston Court
- 7 March 1899: Charles Thomas Daniell Crews, of Billingbear Park, Waltham St. Lawrence, Twyford

=== 1900–1999 ===
- 1900: Frank Walters Bond, of Parkfield, Hampton Wick
- 1901: Blackall Simonds, of Bradfield House, Bradfield
- 1902: Hugh Owen Tudor, of Lynwood, Old Windsor
- 1903: William Howard Palmer, of Heathlands, Wokingham
- 1904: Lieutenant-Colonel Frederick Finch Mackenzie, of Ramslade, Bracknell.
- 1905: Alfred Palmer, of Wokefield Park, Mortimer
- 1906: Cyril Kendall Butler, of Bourton House, Shrivenham
- 1907: Major Edward Arthur Barry, of Ockwells Manor, Maidenhead.
- 1908: Sir William Cameron Gull, 2nd Baronet, of Frilsham House, Newbury
- 1909: William Dockar Drysdale, of Wick Hall, Radley
- 1910: Alexander Felix Clarke, of Midgham House, Woolhampton
- 1911: Archibald Thornton West, of Barcote Manor, Faringdon
- 1912: Alexander Henderson, 1st Baron Faringdon of Buscot House, Faringdon
- 1913: Colonel Francis Cecil Ricardo, of Lullebrook Manor, Cookham
- 1914: Count Dudley Beaumont Melchior Gurowski, of Woolhampton Park, Woolhampton.
- 1915: John Joseph Eyston, of Hendred House, East Hendred, Steventon
- 1916: Edmund Stevens, of Kingston Lisle Park, Wantage
- 1917: Basil Guy Oswald Smith of Shottesbrooke Park
- 1918: Sir Clarendon Golding Hyde, of Longworth House
- 1919: Reginald Henry Cox, of Manor Cottage, Old Windsor
- 1920: Sir William George Watson, 1st Baronet, of Sulhamstead House, near Reading
- 1921: Sir (Adam) Mortimer Singer, of Milton Hill, Steventon
- 1922: Oscar Welwyn Rayner, of Chieveley Manor, Newbury
- 1923: Lieut.-Col. James Ashton Fairhurst, of Arlington Manor, Newbury
- 1924: Samuel Garcia Asher, of Ascot Place, Ascot,
- 1925: Henry Arthur Benyon, of Ufton Court
- 1926: Charles Eric Palmer, of Shinfield Grange, near Reading
- 1927: Arthur Thomas Loyd, of Lockinge House, Wantage
- 1928: Frederick Adolphus Simonds, of Mertonford, Wokingham
- 1929: Albert Sancton Blyth Tull, of Crookham House, Newbury
- 1930: Sir George Robert Mowbray, of Warennes Wood, Mortimer, Reading
- 1931: Vice-Admiral Francis Clifton Brown of Stanford Place, Faringdon
- 1932: Captain Geoffrey Herbert Palmer, of Woolhampton Court
- 1933: Capt. Leonard Noel Sutton, of Hillside, Reading.
- 1934: Sir Robert Andrew Stransham Black, 2nd Baronet, of Midgham Park, Reading
- 1935: Reginald Howard Reed Palmer, of Hurst Grove, near Reading
- 1936: Thomas More Eyston, of Hendred House, East Hendred
- 1937: Leo Francis Page, of Newton House, Faringdon
- 1938: Lieut.-Col. James Nockells Horlick, of Little Paddocks, Sunninghill, Ascot
- 1939: Michael Lavallin Wroughton, of Woolley Park, Wantage
- 1940: Sir Norman James Watson, of Sulhamstead House, near Reading
- 1941: Major Harry Edward Meader, of Farley Court, near Reading
- 1942: Raymond William ffennell, of Wytham Abbey, near Oxford
- 1943: Lieut.-Col. Harold Philip Green, of Queen's Hill, Ascot
- 1944: Lieut.-Colonel Sir (William Ernest George) Archibald Weigall, 1st Baronet, of Englemere, Ascot.
- 1945: Major George Dall Edwards, of Finchampstead House, Finchampstead
- 1946: Herbert James Thomas, of Long Leys House, Cumnor
- 1947: Sir William Mount, 2nd Baronet, of Wasing, Aldermaston
- 1948: Major Leonard Maurice Edward Dent, of Hillfields, Burghfield Common.
- 1949: Colonel Granville Walton, of Longworth Manor, near Abingdon.
- 1950: Maurice Fitz-Gerald Sandes Magill, of Highlands, Spencer's Wood
- 1951: Capt. Thomas Leopold McClintock Lonsdale, of Kingston Lisle Park
- 1952: Col. Clarence Bremer Krabbé, of Calcot Grange
- 1953: Lt.-Col. Rodney Howell Palmer, of Peasemore Manor
- 1954: Rowland Huntley Muir, of Billingbear House
- 1955: Maj. Richard Wellesley, of Old Buckland House, Faringdon
- 1956: Col. Arthur Ewart Marnham, of Foxley Grove, Holyport
- 1957: Langton Iliffe, 2nd Baron Iliffe, of Basildon Park
- 1958: Maj. John Lycett Wills, of Allanbay Park, Binfield
- 1959: Alan Anthony Colleton Godsall, of Haines Hill, Hurst
- 1960: Lieut.-Colonel (Brevet Colonel) Hugh Alfred Gorton Vanderfelt, of Penhallow, Cookham Dean.
- 1961: Christopher Lewis Loyd, of Lockinge, Wantage
- 1962: John Ronald Henderson, of West Woodhay House, Newbury
- 1963: Hugh Waldorf Astor of Folly Farm, Sulhamstead
- 1964: Robert Ralph Merton of The Old Rectory, Burghfield.
- 1965: Gordon William Nottage Palmer of Foudry House, Mortimer
- 1966: Derek Henry Parker Bowles of Donnington Castle House, Newbury.
- 1967: Sir Edward Christian Goschen, 3rd Baronet, of Jesmond Hill, Pangbourne.
- 1968: Michael John Verey of Little Bowden, Pangbourne
- 1969: Major John William Burke Cole of The Malthouse, West Woodham
- 1970: John Philip Lavallin Puxley of Welford House, Newbury
- 1971: Michael George Thomas Webster of The Vale, Windsor Forest
- 1972: John Gilbert Gilby of Inholmes, Woodland St Mary, Newbury
- 1973: Derrick Aylmer Frederick Henry Howard Hartley Russell of Bucklebury House, Bucklebury
- 1974: William Alexander Palmer of Phillips Hill, Snelsmore Common, Newbury
- 1975: Lt-Col Robert Cradoc Rose Price of Tetworth, Ascot
- 1976: Cdr. John Marriott of the Folly, Inkpen, Newbury
- 1977: Philip Lavallin Wroughton of Woolley Park, Wantage
- 1978: Ian Donald Cameron of the Old Rectory, Farnborough (father of David Cameron)
- 1979: Richard John Palmer of Queen Anne's Mead, Windsor
- 1980: Anthony Greenly of Everington House
- 1981: John Edwin Lavallin Nugent of Upper Lambourn, Newbury.
- 1982: Sir David Hill-Wood of Dacre Farm, Farley Hill, Reading
- 1983: Ian Alan Douglas Pilkington of Warrennes Wood, Mortimer
- 1984: David John Simonds of Buckhold Grange, Near Pangbourne
- 1985: Rupert Oliver Steel of Winterbourne Holt, Newbury
- 1986: Charles Peregrine Albemarle Bertie of Frilsham Manor, Hermitage, Newbury
- 1987: Leonard Harold Lionel Cohen of Dovecote House, Swallowfield Park, Reading
- 1988: David Alfred William Gardiner of The Old Rectory, Lilley, Newbury
- 1989: George Raymond Seymour of The Old Vicarage, Bucklebury, Reading
- 1990: Lady Elizabeth Cameron Godsal of Haines Hill, Twyford
- 1991: Lews David Moss of Queensmere, Wokingham
- 1992: Sidney Wallace Smart of Oak Ash, Chaddleworth, Newbury
- 1993: Major Toby Clements Gore.
- 1994: Major Jeremy David Alfonso John Monson of Hare Hatch, near Reading.
- 1995: Sir William Benyon of Englefield House
- 1996: Christopher John Spence of Chieveley Manor, Church Lane, Chieveley, Newbury
- 1997: Major John Roy Trustram Eve of Waltham St. Lawrence, Twyford.
- 1998: Alfred Roland Wiseman of Windsor
- 1999: Michael John Benjamin Todhunter of Farnborough, Wantage, Oxfordshire

=== 2000–present ===
- 2000: James Henry Lavallin Puxley of Welford Park
- 2001: David John Marling Roberts of Sanham Green House, Hungerford
- 2002: Timothy Dawson of Walter's Cottage, Sunningdale
- 2003: Malcolm Kimmins of Wick Lodge, Hoe Benham, Newbury
- 2004: Anthony West of Remenham Manor, Henley-on Thames, Oxfordshire
- 2005: Mary Bayliss of Sheepgridge Court, Swallowfield, Near Reading
- 2006: John Hugh Miller
- 2007: Henry Merton Henderson of West Woodhay House
- 2008: Dr Carolyn Jane Boulter of Reading
- 2009: Dr Christina Bernadette Thérèse Hill Williams of Upper Basildon
- 2010: Catherine May Stevenson of Ascot
- 2011: Robert Barclay Woods of Frilsham
- 2012: Charles David Brims of Brimpton Lodge, Brimpton
- 2013: Professor Suzanna Christina Rose of Henley-on-Thames
- 2014: Christopher Teik Kooi Khoo of Bakers Barn, Touchen End, Maidenhead
- 2015: David Montagu Albermarle Bertie of Allanbay Park Estate Office, Binfield
- 2016: Victoria Jane Fishburn of The Vicarage, Englefield, Reading
- 2017: Sarah Patricia Scrope of Chilton Lodge, Hungerford
- 2018: Graham Eric Barker of Maidenhead
- 2019: Lucy Violet Zeal of Haines Hill House, Twyford
- 2020: Mary Elizabeth Riall of Ufton Court, Reading
- 2021: Robin Derek [Willie] Hartley Russell of Bucklebury House
- 2022: Alka Kharbanda of Bray
- 2023: Simon Huntly Muir of Binfield, Bracknell
- 2024: Alexander Barfield of Waltham St Lawrence
- 2025: Sean Zain Taylor of Hook
- 2026: Renu Raksha Wing Kapur, of Twyford

== Bibliography ==
- Hughes, A. (1898). List of Sheriffs for England and Wales from the Earliest Times to A.D. 1831. London: Eyre & Spottiswoode. (with amendments of 1963, Public Record Office)
