= Adrian Palmer =

Adrian Palmer may refer to:

- Adrian Palmer, 4th Baron Palmer
- Adrian Palmer, a member of the New Zealand band Zed
