= Sunninghill Park =

Former country house and estate in Berkshire, England

Coordinates: 51.4258°N 0.6498°W

Sunninghill Park was a country house and estate of about 665 acres (269 hectares) directly north of Cheapside, in the civil parishes of Sunninghill and Ascot and Winkfield, adjoining Windsor Great Park in the English county of Berkshire.

The early 19th-century house burned down in 1947 and a replacement was built in the grounds during the final years of the 1980s to be the official residence of the Duke of York from 1990 until 2004; it was sold in 2007 to Timur Kulibayev for £19.7 million which was £4 million more than the asking price. The house fell into disrepair and was demolished in 2016. A new house has since been built but not occupied.

== 19th-century house ==
Sunninghill Park was originally part of Windsor Forest. A royal house was built at Sunninghill in 1511, and in 1527, Galyon Hone was employed to repair the glazing, when it was intended Princess Mary would stay there. In 1630, King Charles I granted it to Thomas Carey. Around 1633, the estate was purchased by Sir Thomas Draper and sold in 1769 by his great-grandson, Thomas Draper Baber, to Jeremiah Crutchley, whose family owned it until it was sold in 1936 by Percy Edward Crutchley (whose maternal grandparents were the owners of Eldon House in London, Ontario).

A new house was built on the estate in the late Georgian period, in the early 19th century, being a stucco building of two storeys with later additions. It served as the headquarters of the American Ninth Air Force from November 1943 to September 1944. The Crown Estate Commissioners purchased the property from Philip Hill in 1945. The main house was to be occupied by Princess Elizabeth (later Queen Elizabeth II) and her future husband, Prince Philip, Duke of Edinburgh, after their wedding in November 1947. However, the house burned down on 30 August 1947, so they rented Windlesham Moor instead. In the mid-1960s, the site was considered for a new home for Princess Margaret.

== 1980s house ==
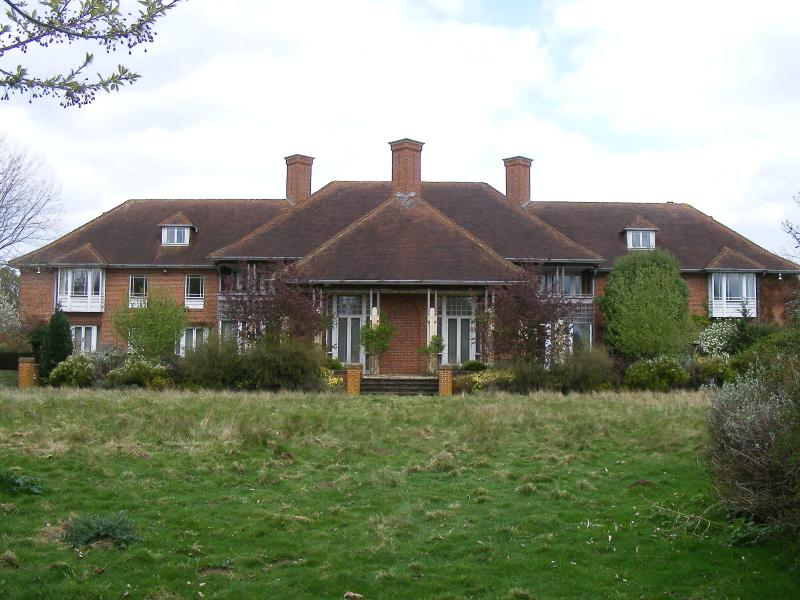
Rear view of the 1990–2016 house

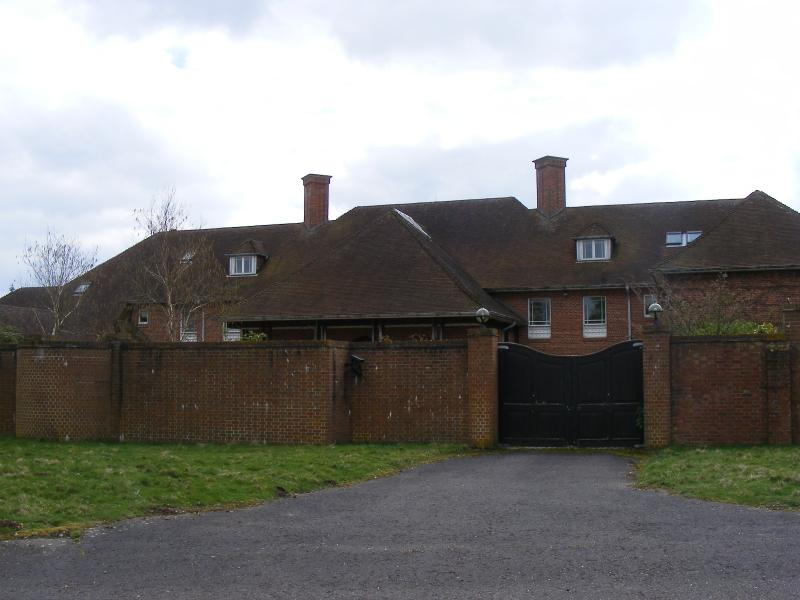
Front entrance to the house

In 1986, the walled garden of five acres (two hectares) was purchased from the Crown Estate Commissioners on behalf of Queen Elizabeth II. The following year, construction began on a two-storey red brick house to be the home of the Duke and Duchess of York, who had married in July 1986. The architect was Sir James Dunbar-Nasmith, Balmoral Estate Architect and professor at Heriot-Watt University. Construction was completed in 1990.

The house had six reception rooms, 12 bedrooms, and 12 bathrooms. It was the first newly built royal home since Bagshot Park, which was built in 1879 for the Duke of Connaught. In the British tabloid press, the home was often referred to as 'Southyork', a play on the 'Southfork' estate in the popular 1980s soap opera Dallas. It was also "mocked for its resemblance to a Tesco-style supermarket".

The Duke and Duchess were divorced in 1996. Following the death of Queen Elizabeth the Queen Mother in 2002, it was announced that the Duke of York would live in her former home, Royal Lodge, Windsor. The Duke and Duchess shared the family's home until 2004, when he moved to Royal Lodge, the refurbishment of which was funded by taking out a mortgage on Sunninghill Park. The house was placed on the market in 2001, but the Duchess of York and her daughters continued to live there until sometime before it was sold in 2007.

Its legal title records that the house and some of its grounds were sold for £15 million in 2007, £3 million over the asking price, to an offshore trust in the British Virgin Islands. Kenes Rakishev, a 29-year-old Kazakh businessman who called himself a friend of Prince Andrew, professed to have negotiated the deal with the help of his father-in-law Imangali Tasmagambetov, the mayor of Astana, but insisted neither of them was the owner. Later, the owner was revealed to be Timur Kulibayev, the billionaire son-in-law of the Kazakh president, Nursultan Nazarbayev. Kulibayev acknowledged ownership after a newspaper investigation revealed he had used offshore companies and a trust to make the purchase.

The house fell into an increasing state of disrepair. By 2009, it had "doors hanging open, weeds sprouting through the terrace paving, windows broken, grass growing through the cover over the empty swimming pool, peeling paintwork and a general air of dereliction." In July 2009, Bracknell Forest Borough Council were said to be considering seizing the property under the Housing Act 2004 and using it as a homeless shelter, following several reported break-ins. In 2013, the owner was granted planning permission to demolish it and replace it with a larger house, and in 2014, photos showed that the former royal home appeared to be seriously dilapidated. Demolition was temporarily halted when more than 100 bats were found roosting under its roof, before its actual demolition. A 14-bedroom mansion was built in its place, but it has never been occupied.
