= 1804 in the United Kingdom =

Events from the year 1804 in the United Kingdom.

== Incumbents ==
- Monarch – George III
- Prime Minister – Henry Addington (Tory) (until 10 May), William Pitt the Younger (Tory) (starting 10 May)
- Foreign Secretary – Lord Hawkesbury (until 14 May) Dudley Ryder, 1st Earl of Harrowby (from 14 May)
- Home Secretary – Charles Philip Yorke (until 12 May) Lord Liverpool (from 12 May)
- Secretary of War – Lord Hobart (until 12 May) Lord Camden (from 14 May)

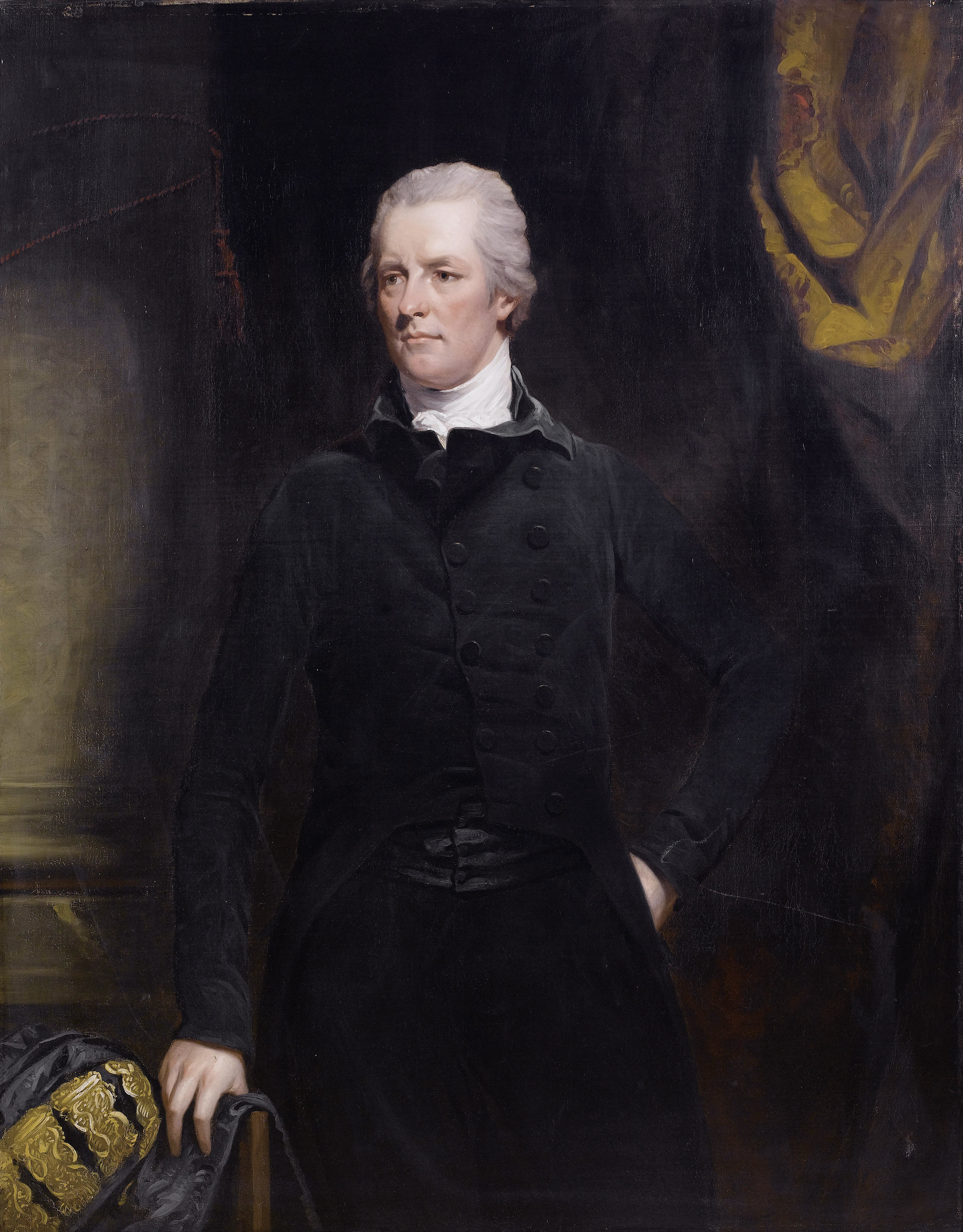
William Pitt the Younger

== Events ==
- January – HMS York (1796) founders on patrol off Scotland, apparently striking the Inchcape rock, with the loss of all 491 on board.
- 3 January – Hammersmith Ghost murder case.
- 21 February – The Cornishman Richard Trevithick's newly built "Penydarren" steam locomotive operates on the Merthyr Tramroad between Penydarren Ironworks in Merthyr Tydfil and Abercynon in South Wales, following several trials since 13 February, the world's first locomotive to work on rails.
- 7 March
  - John Wedgwood founds the Royal Horticultural Society as the Horticultural Society of London. Another founding member, William Forsyth, dies on 25 July.
  - Thomas Charles is instrumental in founding the Bible Society.
- 2 April – Forty merchant vessels are wrecked when a convoy led by HMS Apollo runs aground off Portugal.
- 5 April – High Possil meteorite, the first recorded meteorite to fall in Scotland in modern times, falls at Possil.
- 26 April – Henry Addington resigns as Prime Minister.
- 10 May – William Pitt the Younger begins his second premiership as Prime Minister.
- 12 December – Spain declares war on Britain.
- 21 December – Rochdale Canal opens, the first to cross the Pennines.

=== Ongoing ===
- Anglo-Spanish War, 1796–1808
- Napoleonic Wars, 1803–1815

=== Undated ===
- Construction of Martello towers to protect the coasts of south east England and Ireland against the threat of French invasion is begun, together with (from 30 October) the Royal Military Canal.
- Marlborough White Horse cut in Wiltshire.
- William Blake writes Milton: a Poem including the poem And did those feet in ancient time.
- William Wordsworth writes I Wandered Lonely as a Cloud.
- Dr Joseph Mason Cox publishes Practical Observations on Insanity; in which some suggestions are offered towards an improved mode of treating diseases of the mind, and some rules proposed which it is hoped may lead to a more humane and successful method of cure.

== Births ==
- Early February – James Bronterre O'Brien, Irish-born Chartist leader, reformer and journalist (died 1864)
- 4 April – Andrew Nicholl, Irish-born painter (died 1886)
- 20 July – James Kay-Shuttleworth, educationist (died 1877)
- 14 September – John Gould, ornithologist (died 1881)
- 6 November – Benjamin Hall Kennedy, Latin scholar and promoter of women's higher education (died 1889)
- 21 December – Benjamin Disraeli, Prime Minister (died 1881)

== Deaths ==
- 4 January – Charlotte Lennox, author and poet (born 1727)
- 15 January – Dru Drury, entomologist (born 1725)
- 6 February – Joseph Priestley, chemist (born 1733)
- 4 August – Adam Duncan, 1st Viscount Duncan, Scottish-born admiral (born 1731)
- 29 October – Sarah Crosby, Methodist preacher (born 1729)
- 23 November – Richard Graves, writer (born 1715)
