= Michael Verey =

British merchant banker

Michael John Verey TD (12 October 1912 - 2000) was a British merchant banker and former chairman of Schroders. He was High Sheriff of Berkshire in 1968.

== Early life and family ==
Michael Verey was born on 12 October 1912. He was educated at Eton College and at Trinity College, University of Cambridge.

== Career ==
Verey started his banking career at Herbert, Wagg & Co, eventually becoming chairman of Schroders.

Verey served in the Warwickshire Yeomanry during the Second World War as part of the British Expeditionary Force to Palestine that fought in Iraq, Persia, Syria and the Western Desert and then in Italy. By 1944 he had reached the rank of lieutenant colonel. He received the Territorial Decoration on demobilisation.

He lived at Little Bowden at Pangbourne in Berkshire and was appointed High Sheriff of Berkshire in 1968.

== Later life ==
Verey was the subject of a British Library oral history recording. He died in 2000.
