= Bartholomew Tipping VII =

Bartholomew Tipping (1735–1798) was the High Sheriff of Berkshire in England.

Bartholomew was the son of Bartholomew Tipping VI of Woolley Park at Chaddleworth in Berkshire and his wife, Anne Henshaw. He inherited the family estate in 1757 and became High Sheriff in 1798, the year before his death. He was great-grandson of Bartholomew Tipping IV, a previous high sheriff. He never married and died at Woolley on 13 December 1798, being subsequently buried in Chaddleworth Church. He is a direct ancestral uncle of Philip Lavallin Wroughton, Lord Lieutenant of Berkshire (1995–2008).
