= Johnny Henderson (soldier) =

English soldier and aide-de-camp

Major John Ronald Henderson CVO OBE JP (6 May 1920 – 6 December 2003) was an English soldier and aide-de-camp to Field Marshal Viscount Montgomery of Alamein.

The grand-nephew of Alexander Henderson, 1st Baron Faringdon, he served in the 12th Royal Lancers and later lived at West Woodhay House in Berkshire, holding the offices of High Sheriff of Berkshire and Lord Lieutenant of Berkshire.

He was twice married:

1. 8 November 1949 to Katherine Sarah Beckwith-Smith (29 January 1925 – 1972), by whom he had three children:
  - Nicholas John Henderson (Nicky Henderson) (born 10 December 1950)
  - Henry Merton Henderson (born 25 April 1952)
  - Joanna Sarah Henderson (born 23 March 1955)
2. 1976 to Catherine Christian

Honorary titles
Preceded by Hon. Gordon Palmer	Lord Lieutenant of Berkshire; 1989–1995	Succeeded by Philip Wroughton
