= Hugh de Bocland =

Anglo-Norman nobleman

Hugh de Bocland or Hugh of Buckland (died 1119?), was sheriff of Berkshire and several other counties.

== Origins ==
Bocland received his surname from the manor of Buckland, near Faringdon, in Berkshire (now Oxfordshire), of which he was tenant under the monastery of Abingdon.

== Career ==
Before the death of William Rufus, he was already High Sheriff of Berkshire and he is stated in the Abingdon Chronicle to have been one of the persons who profited by the unjust transactions of Modbert, whom the king appointed to administer the affairs of the monastery in the interest of the royal revenues, during the period when the office of abbot was vacant. He was ordered by Henry I to restore to the abbey the possessions which he had in this manner wrongfully obtained. Notwithstanding this, the Abingdon historian gives Hugh a high character for uprightness and wisdom. The same authority states that he was held in great esteem by Henry I, and that he was sheriff of eight counties. Six of these, the evidence of charters enables us to identify, viz. Berkshire, Hertfordshire, Bedfordshire, Buckinghamshire, Essex, and Middlesex. It is sometimes stated that Hugh de Bocland was Justiciar of England, but this assertion is extremely questionable. It is true that he is so described in the copy of Henry I's charter of liberties, which Matthew Paris quotes as having been read to the barons in 1213; but in the obviously more accurate copy of this charter, given by the same historian under the date 1100, the designation of justiciar is wanting. The Abingdon Chronicle also speaks of Hugh as 'justiciarius publicarum compellationum;' the precise import of this expression, however, is not clear. The statement in Foss's 'Lives of the Judges' that he was canon of St Paul's is probably erroneous, although his name occurs (without date or reference to any authority) in the list of prebendaries of Harleston in Newcourt's 'Repertorium,' i. 151. He witnessed a St. Albans charter dated 1116, and also another charter of the same abbey, which Mr. Luard assigns, apparently on good grounds, to the year 1119. As we find from the Abingdon history that William de Bochelande (presumably a son of Hugh) was High Sheriff of Berkshire in 1120, it may be inferred that Hugh de Bocland died in 1119. Another Hugh de Bocland, who may have been a grandson of the subject of this article, was High Sheriff of Berkshire from 1170 to 1176, and was one of the itinerant justices in 1173 and 1174.
