= William Wiseman Clarke =

- Born: 1759
- Died: 4 September 1826 (aged 67)

William Wiseman Clarke of Ardington (1759–1826) was High Sheriff of Berkshire.

== Biography ==
William was born in 1759 and was educated at John Roysse's Free School in Abingdon, (now Abingdon School). He received his later education at Christ Church, Oxford.

He lived at Ardington House and, in 1811, he was appointed High Sheriff of Berkshire.

He died on 4 September 1826 aged 67 and was described as one of the oldest magistrates and deputy-lieutenants of the county.

Political offices
Preceded by Peter Green	High Sheriff of Berkshire; 1811-12	Succeeded by George Elwes

== See also ==
- List of Old Abingdonians
