= Jo Cox (disambiguation) =

Jo Cox (1974–2016) was a British politician.

Jo Cox may also refer to:

- Joanna Cox (fl. 2010s), British sailor and harbourmaster
- Josephine Cox (1938–2020), English author
- Jo Cox-Ladru (1923–2014), Dutch gymnast

== See also ==
- Joseph Cox (disambiguation), men named Joe Cox
