= South Ascot =

Village in Berkshire, England

Coordinates: 51.403°N 0.671°W

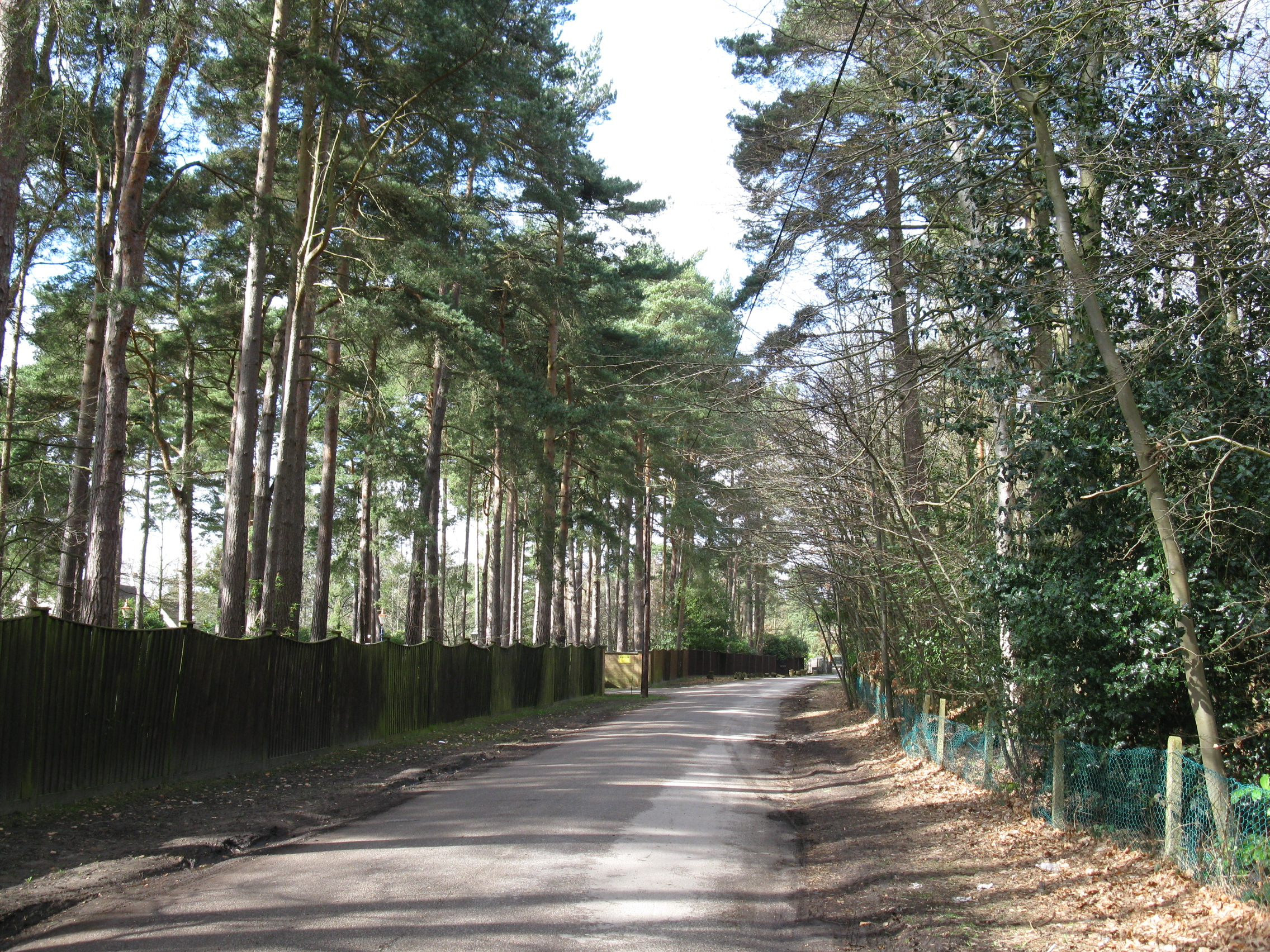
Bodens Ride (a private road that leads to Swinley Forest Golf Club)

South Ascot is a village just south of and down the hill from the small town of Ascot in the English county of Berkshire. It is bounded on the west by the Kingsride area of Swinley Woods, on the north by the Reading to Waterloo railway line and merges with Sunninghill to the east.

== Local government ==
South Ascot is in the civil parish of Sunninghill and Ascot, part of the district administered by the Royal Borough of Windsor and Maidenhead, a unitary authority.

== Notable residents ==
During World War II the village was home to the exiled King Zog of Albania, who lived at 'Forest Ridge' in Bagshot Road for a few months in 1941.

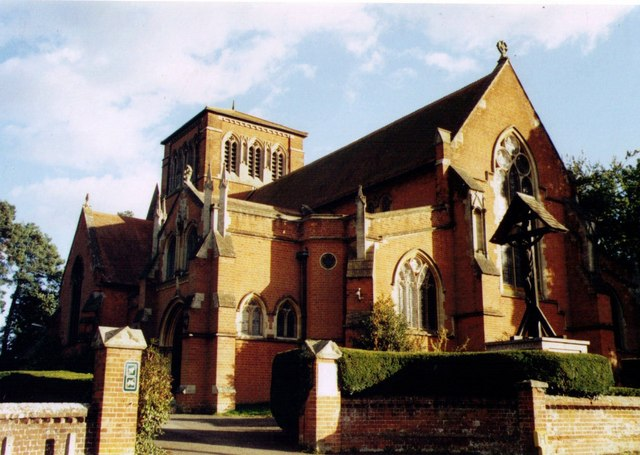
The church of All Souls

== Housing and amenities ==
The housing here is more modest, but generally pleasant with plenty of open space and woodland. Most houses are Victorian villas or semi-detached, although more recent development is also in evidence. House prices tend to be slightly more expensive than its northern counterpart and are well above national average and ideal for commuting into London or Reading. There are a number of shops, including a pub, along the Brockenhurst Road (A330) and Ascot railway station is found on the northern edge of the village. St. Francis Roman Catholic Primary School in South Ascot is considered one of the best in the borough. The church of All Souls was built in 1896–97. The architect was John Loughborough Pearson. There is a chapel by Martin Travers. The church belongs to the Anglo-Catholic tradition within the Church of England.
