= Cheapside, Berkshire =

Coordinates: 51°25′05″N 0°38′42″W

Cheapside
- Hamlet
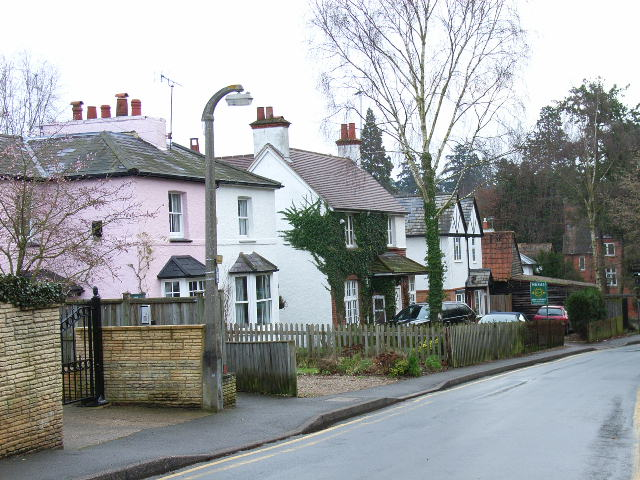
- Cheapside

- Location within Berkshire
- OS grid reference: SU9469
- Civil parish: Sunninghill and Ascot
- Unitary authority: Royal Borough of Windsor and Maidenhead
- Ceremonial county: Berkshire
- Region: South East
- Country: England
- Sovereign state: United Kingdom
- Post town: Ascot
- Postcode district: SL5
- Dialling code: 01344
- Police: Thames Valley
- Fire: Royal Berkshire
- Ambulance: South Central
- UK Parliament: Windsor

Cheapside is a hamlet in the civil parish of Sunninghill and Ascot and ecclesiastical parish of Sunninghill in the Royal Borough of Windsor and Maidenhead in Berkshire, England which includes a primary school and had a Methodist chapel. It is a cluster of houses, bungalows and cottages. It is marked on maps as the area north and east of Silwood Park and south of Sunninghill Park. Harewood Lodge followed by Titness House to its immediate east are of similar 18th century construction and have sometimes been recorded as in the Cheapside area. To the east, there is the B383 road that provides routes to the local villages of Cranbourne, Sunningdale and Chobham.

== Geography ==
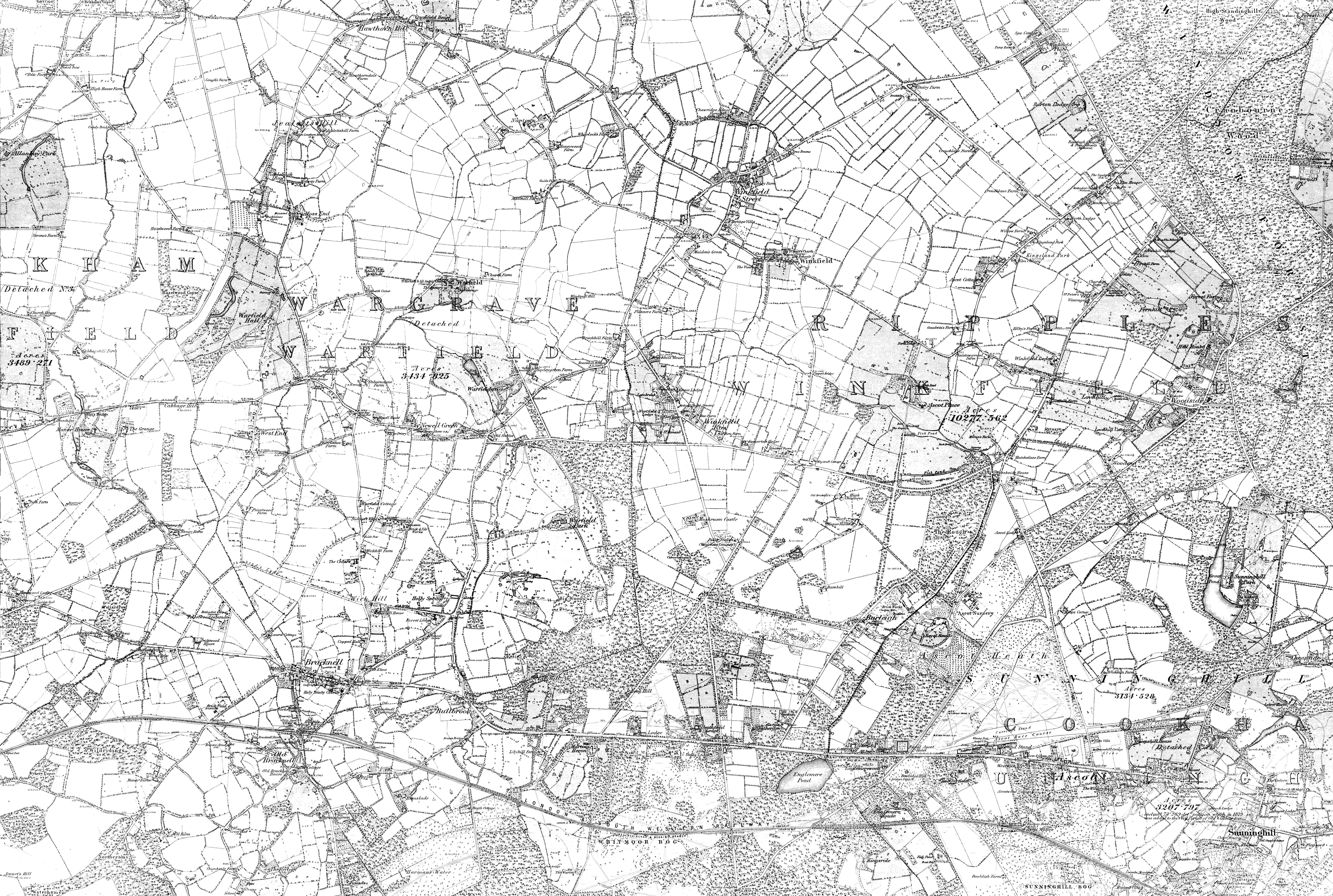
Extract from Map of Berkshire Sheet 039, Ordnance Survey 1st series (scale 1:10560), 1876-1886

The bulk of this neighbourhood of Sunninghill has a less sandy soil, thus a tradition of mixed farming supporting its market hence its name, (the Anglo-Saxon word for a market is a "cheap". It is throughout at lower altitude than the mainly 18th century built-up village south of the church forming the heart of Sunninghill. In the south-east it has the west shore of Virginia Water Lake.

Cheapside is centred 1.5 miles (2.4 km) east of the centre of Ascot, one of Europe's main venues in horse racing. East is the southern part of Windsor Great Park which has denser pockets of tall trees; Sunninghill has remains of its forest throughout — Sunninghill Park was part of Windsor Forest until King Charles I sold it to Thomas Carey in 1630. The area is dotted with artificial feeder ponds or lakes to the Bourne which rises at multiple sources in the area.

== Amenities ==
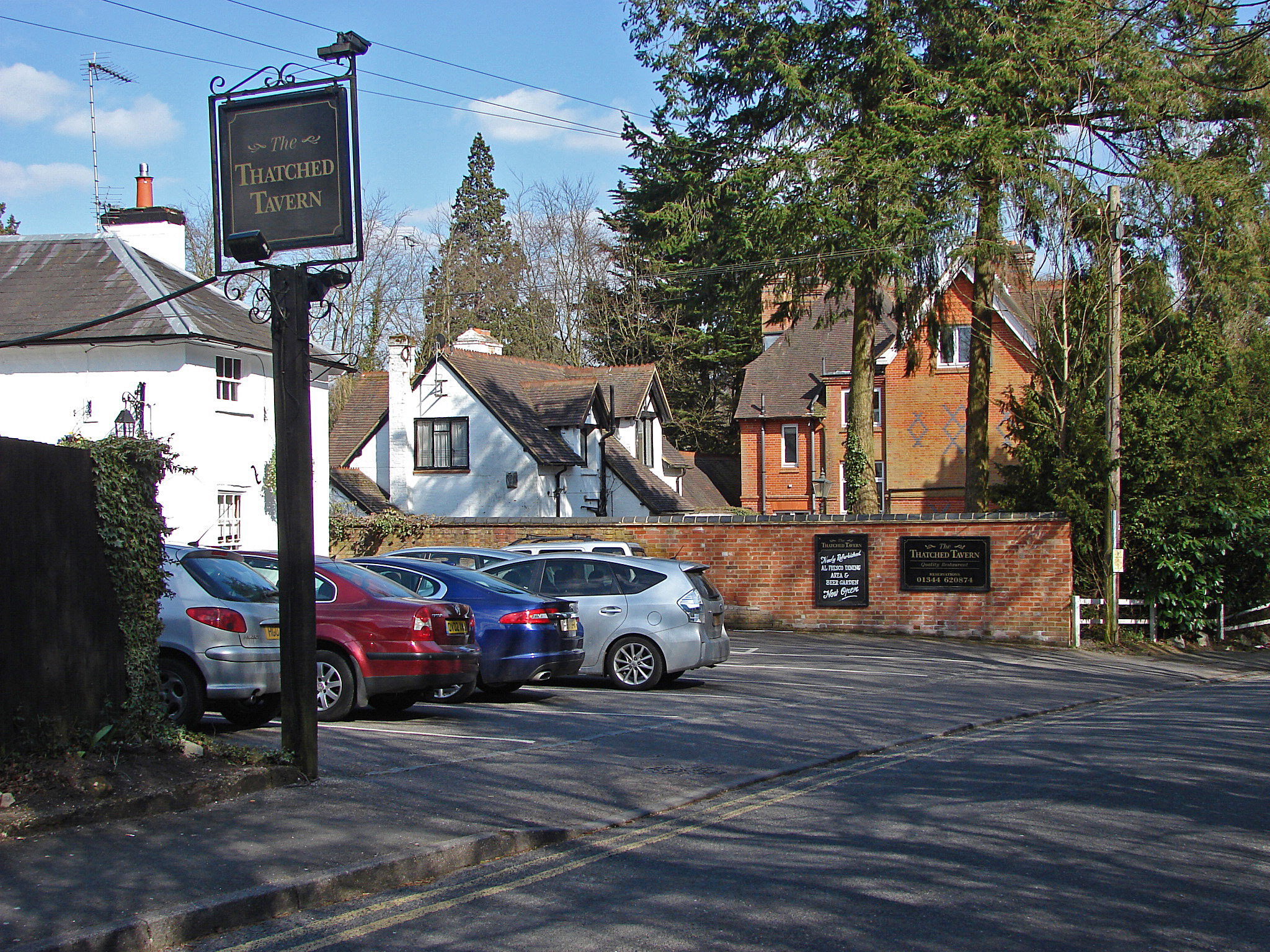
The Thatched Tavern

The main public amenity is Cheapside (C of E) primary school, since the mid-20th century, a large building on a 2-acre site, having been directly south historically. The local pub is the Thatched Tavern; dated to, at least, the late 17th century and Grade II listed.

== Religion ==
The area has for more than eight centuries been a neighbourhood in the north of the Anglican parish of Sunninghill. Its church replaced a forerunner on the site (about half a mile south of Cheapside) built in about 1120 and may have had earlier predecessors.
