= Raymond Palmer, 3rd Baron Palmer =

Raymond Cecil Palmer, 3rd Baron Palmer OBE (24 June 1916 – 26 June 1990) was a British peer and business man, a member of the House of Lords from 1950 until his death.

== Early life ==
The son of Ernest Cecil Nottage Palmer, 2nd Baron Palmer and his wife Marguerite Osborne, Palmer was educated at Harrow School and University College, Oxford. He was commissioned as a Lieutenant into the Grenadier Guards, but retired, injured.

== Career ==
On 6 June 1950, Palmer succeeded his father as Baron Palmer in the peerage of the United Kingdom, giving him a seat in the House of Lords. He also became the third Palmer baronet.

He became chairman of Huntley & Palmers and of Huntley, Boorne & Stevens, a director of Associated Biscuit Manufacturers, and president of the Thames Valley Trustee Savings Bank.

== Personal life ==
On 30 January 1941, Palmer married Victoria Ellen Stevens, daughter of Captain Joseph Arthur Ronald Weston Stevens, and they had three daughters:

- Amanda Victoria Palmer (1949–1954)
- Carol Lylie Palmer (born 1951), who married John Wodehouse, future Earl of Kimberley, and is the mother of David Wodehouse, Lord Wodehouse (born 1978).
- Vanessa Marguerite Palmer (born 1954)

== Honours ==
- Officer of the Order of the British Empire, 1968

== Arms ==
Coat of arms of Raymond Palmer, 3rd Baron Palmer
| Crest Upon a mount Vert in front of a palm tree Proper three escallops fessways Or. Escutcheon Per saltire Azure and Gules two palmers'staves in saltire between four escallops Or. Supporters On either side a palmer supporting with the exterior hand a palmer's staff Proper. Motto Per Crucem Ad Palmam (Through The Cross To The Palm) |

== Notes ==
Peerage of the United Kingdom
| Preceded by Cecil Palmer | Baron Palmer; 1950–1990 | Succeeded by Adrian Palmer |
Baronetage of the United Kingdom
| Preceded by Cecil Palmer | Baronet (of Reading, Berkshire); 1950–1990 | Succeeded by Adrian Palmer |
