= William Noake =

High Sheriff of Berkshire

William Noake (1690–1737) was a High Sheriff of Berkshire in England.

William was born in Reading, the son of Robert Noake of Southcote, a gentleman brewer and sometime mayor of Reading, and his wife, Ann. He inherited his father's business and estate in 1719 and became high sheriff ten years later. He never married and died in Reading on 16 October 1737. He was buried under his family pew in St Mary's Church.
