= John Southby (1594–1683) =

English landowner and politician

John Southby (1594–1683) was an English landowner and politician who sat in the House of Commons from 1654 to 1656.

Southby was the son of Richard Southby of Carswell Manor in the parish of Buckland in Berkshire (now Oxfordshire) and his wife, Jane, the daughter of Edward Keate of Lockinge in Berkshire (now Oxfordshire). His father died when he was twelve and he inherited the manor which he is considered responsible for rebuilding in the first half of the 17th century. He was a Justice of the Peace for Berkshire and was High Sheriff of Berkshire in 1647.

In 1654, Southby was elected Member of Parliament for Berkshire in the First Protectorate Parliament. He was re-elected MP for Berkshire in 1656 for the Second Protectorate Parliament

Southby married Elizabeth Wiseman daughter and heiress of William Wiseman of Steventon in Berkshire (now Oxfordshire). Their son Richard was also an MP.

Parliament of England
Preceded by Samuel Dunch; Vincent Goddard; Thomas Wood	Member of Parliament for Berkshire; 1654–1656; With: Edmund Dunch; John Dunch; George Purefoy 1654; Sir Robert Pye 1654; William Trumball 1656; William Hide 1656	Succeeded by John Dunch; Sir Robert Pye
