= Bartholomew Tipping IV =

Bartholomew Tipping (1648–1718) was the High Sheriff of Berkshire in England.

Bartholomew was the son of John Tipping of Chequers at Stokenchurch in Oxfordshire (now Buckinghamshire) and Woolley Park at Chaddleworth in Berkshire and his wife, Mary Spire. John Tipping was the son of Eternity Tipping's first cousin. Bartholomew Tipping became High Sheriff in 1690 and inherited the family's Berkshire estate in 1701. He married Margaret Tubb and had one son, Bartholomew Tipping V, grandfather of the later High Sheriff, Bartholomew Tipping VII. He died at Woolley on 6 June 1718 and was buried in Chaddleworth Church. He is a direct ancestor of Philip Lavallin Wroughton, Lord Lieutenant of Berkshire (1995–2008).
