= Thomas Head =

Sir Thomas Head
- Born: c. 1715
- Died: 1779

Sir Thomas Head (c. 1715–1779) was High Sheriff of Berkshire.

== Biography ==
Thomas was born in about 1715, the son of Richard Head of Bucklebury in West Berkshire. He was educated at John Roysse's Free School in Abingdon, (now Abingdon School) (1730–1735) and later Corpus Christi College, Oxford B.A (1735–1738).

In 1744, Thomas was knighted and was appointed High Sheriff of Berkshire. He married Jane Holt of Redgrave Hall, Suffolk in 1750 and they lived together at Langley Hall in Hampstead Norreys.

His son, Sir Walter James James (formerly Walter Head) (1759–1829), became the first baronet of Langley Hall.

Political offices
Preceded by John Blandy, of Kingston Bagpuze	High Sheriff of Berkshire; 1744-45	Succeeded by Samuel Beaver, of Stratfield Mortimer

== See also ==
- List of Old Abingdonians
