= Free Bench =

Ancient English custom allowing widows to retain their husband's land

Free bench was a customary legal right in certain parts of England, allowing a widow to retain tenancy of her deceased husband's copyhold land, provided she remained unmarried and, in many places, chaste. Unlike dower, which was a legal entitlement under common law, free bench arose from manorial custom and varied significantly between manors.

"Free Bench (Lat. francus bancus). The widow's right to a copyhold. It is not a dower or gift, but a free right independent of the will of the husband. Called bench because, upon acceding to the estate, she becomes a tenant of the manor, and one of the benchers, i.e. persons who sit on the bench occupied by the pares curiæ (Peers of Court)".

The widow of a tenant was usually permitted to retain her free bench as long as she remained chaste. If there was evidence of sexual misconduct or she declared an intention to remarry, her rights to the land were forfeited.

The rules governing free bench were not uniform and depended on local custom. Some manors did not recognize the right at all.

In a few instances, local customs included ritual acts by which a widow could regain her tenancy despite having violated the conditions. One such case, recorded in No. 614 of The Spectator, describes a widow who was required to ride into court on a black ram, holding its tail, and recite the following lines:

"Here I am,
Riding upon a black ram,
Like a whore as I am;
And for my crincum crancum (wicked conduct),
Have lost my bincum bancum (widow's land),
And for my tail's game
Have done this worldly shame;
Therefore I pray you, Mr Steward,
Let me have my land again."

== Legrewite ==
A similar practice to freebench sometimes applied to the children, who had to follow the conditions of their father. The lord had to look narrowly after the morals and marriages of the daughters of his farmers. A case of female incontinence was punished by a fine called 'Legrewite' or 'Leyr-wite' [From leyr derives 'lair'. l< OE leger= lying (down), a bed + wite = a fine], and the birth of an illegitimate child was followed by another called 'childwite' , which in one of the manors of Bury Monastery was fixed at 2s. 8d.: it was due from the guardian, who might be the father or the brother, of the unfortunate damsel. In some cases the young woman went through a grotesque act of penance. At Faringdon, a tenant's daughter, on being convicted of incontinence, forfeited forty pence (no small sum) in the reign of Henry III, to the lord of the manor; which was only remitted on condition of the offender's appearing in the lord's court, carrying a black sheep on her back, and making confession of her shame.

== Manors where this custom is recorded ==
- Chaddleworth, Berkshire.
- Enborne, Berkshire
- Talskiddy, Cornwall.
- Cardinham, Cornwall.
- Torre, Devon.
- Kilmersdon, Somerset

== See also ==
- Manorialism
- Manor house
- Feudalism
