= Ernest Palmer, 1st Baron Palmer =

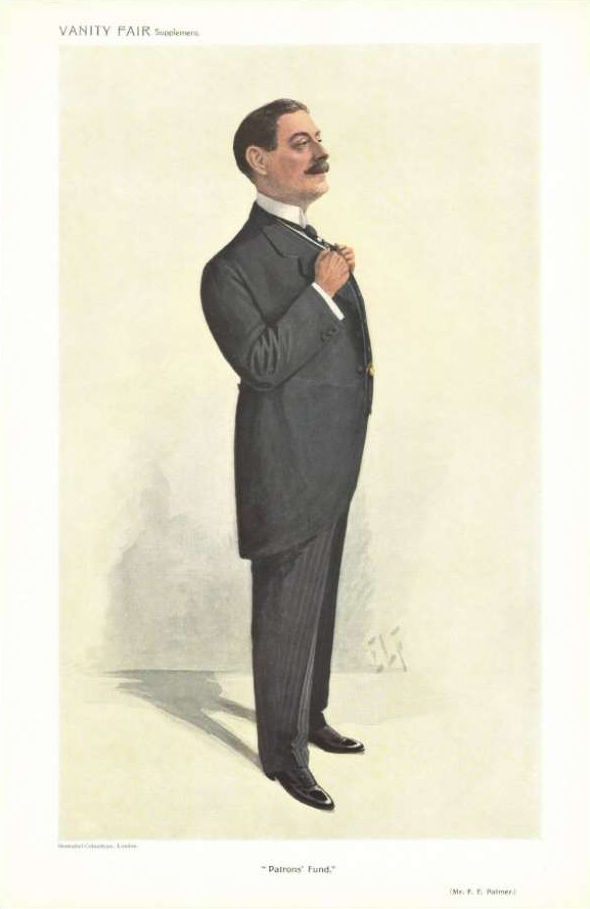
"Patron's Fund". Caricature by Elf published in Vanity Fair in 1909.

Samuel Ernest Palmer, 1st Baron Palmer (28 March 1858 – 8 December 1948), known as Sir Ernest Palmer, 1st Baronet, from 1916, was a British business man and patron of music.

Palmer was the eldest son of Samuel Palmer, of Hampstead. He was educated at Malvern College. He was a Director of the family firm of Huntley & Palmers Ltd of Reading, Berkshire, the largest biscuit manufacturer in the world. However, Palmer is mostly known for his services to music. He was vice-president and a Member of the Council of the Royal College of Music and was elected its first Fellow in 1921 He was the founder of the Royal College of Music Patron's Fund, the Berkshire Scholarship and the Ernest Palmer Fund for Opera Study. He was created a Baronet, of Grosvenor Crescent in the City of Westminster in 1916, and on 24 June 1933 he was raised to the peerage as Baron Palmer, of Reading in the County of Berkshire.

Lord Palmer married Amy Christiana, daughter of George Swan Nottage, Lord Mayor of London, in 1881. She died in 1947. Lord Palmer survived her by a year and died in December 1948, aged 90. He was succeeded in his titles by his son Cecil.

== Arms ==
Coat of arms of Ernest Palmer, 1st Baron Palmer
| Crest Upon a mount Vert in front of a palm tree Proper three escallops fessways Or. Escutcheon Per saltire Azure and Gules two palmers'staves in saltire between four escallops Or. Supporters On either side a palmer supporting with the exterior hand a palmer's staff Proper. Motto Per Crucem Ad Palmam (Through The Cross To The Palm) |

Honorary titles
| Preceded by Walter Whigham | High Sheriff of the County of London; 1924–1925 | Succeeded by Arthur Whitworth |
Peerage of the United Kingdom
| New creation | Baron Palmer; 1933–1948 | Succeeded by Cecil Palmer |
Baronetage of the United Kingdom
| New creation | Baronet of Reading, Berkshire; 1916–1948 | Succeeded by Cecil Palmer |
