= Adrian Palmer, 4th Baron Palmer =

British aristocrat (1951–2023)

The Right Honourable The Lord Palmer
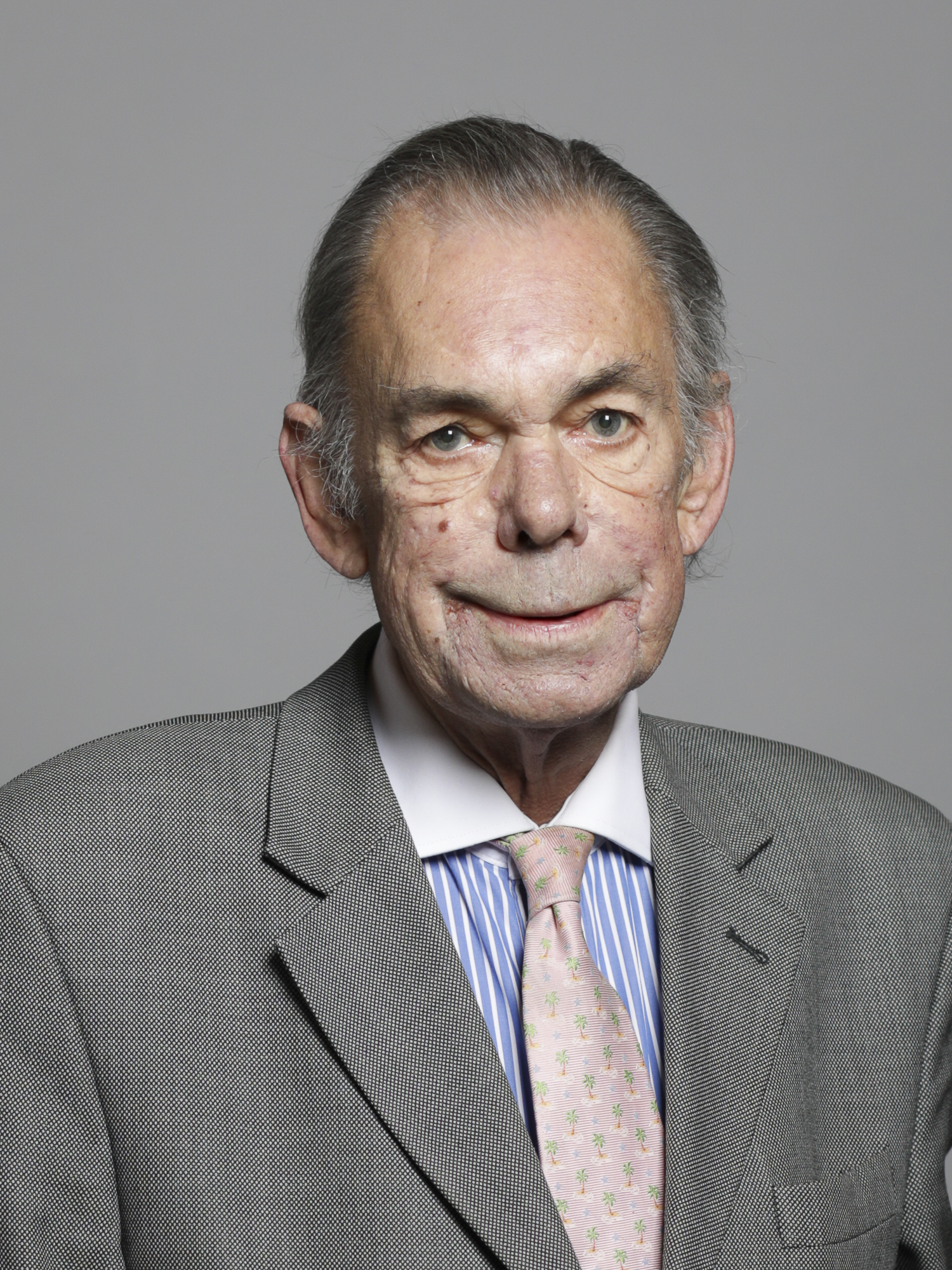
- Official portrait, 2020

Member of the House of Lords
- Lord Temporal
- Hereditary peerage 2 October 1990 – 11 November 1999
- Preceded by: The 3rd Baron Palmer
- Succeeded by: Seat abolished
- Elected Hereditary Peer; 11 November 1999 – 10 July 2023
- Election: 1999
- Preceded by: Seat established
- Succeeded by: The 3rd Baron Meston

Personal details
- Born: Adrian Bailie Nottage Palmer; 8 October 1951
- Died: 10 July 2023 (aged 71)
- Party: Crossbench
- Spouses: Cornelia Wadham (m. 1977; div. 2004) Loraine McMurrey (m. 2006; div. 2013)
- Children: 3
- Education: Eton College
- Alma mater: University of Edinburgh (PCFP)

Adrian Bailie Nottage Palmer, 4th Baron Palmer (8 October 1951 – 10 July 2023), was a British aristocrat and landowner in Scotland. Lord Palmer succeeded his uncle in the peerage in 1990, and was one of the original ninety hereditary peers elected to remain in the House of Lords after the passing of the House of Lords Act 1999; he sat as a crossbencher until his death.

== Early life ==
Adrian Palmer was the son of Colonel the Hon. Sir Gordon Palmer, a younger son of Cecil Palmer, 2nd Baron Palmer, by his marriage to Lorna Eveline Hope Bailie.

Palmer was educated at Eton and the University of Edinburgh, where he received a Certificate in Farming Practice.

== Career ==
Palmer was an apprentice at his family's biscuit factory, Huntley and Palmers Ltd, in Reading, and then worked as sales manager in Belgium and Luxembourg, between 1974 and 1977.

From 1977 to 1986 he was the Scottish representative to the European Landowners' Organisation (ELO). He was member of the Executive Council of the Historic Houses Association from 1981 to 1999, and of the council of the Scottish Landowners' Federation from 1986 to 1992. Between 1989 and 2005, he was also secretary of the Royal Caledonian Hunt. For the Historic Houses Association for Scotland, The Lord Palmer was vice-chairman in 1993 and 1994, and chairman between 1994 and 1999.

Palmer was also President of the Palm Tree Silk Company in St Lucia, of the British Association of Biofuels and Oils (BABFO), and of the transport division of the Renewable Energy Authority. He was a member of the National Farmers Union of Scotland and between 1994 and 2023 he was chairman of the Country Sports Defence Trust. Between 1990 and 1996, he was a member of the Royal Company of Archers.

== Marriages and children ==
On 7 May 1977, at Haileybury, Hertfordshire, Palmer married firstly Cornelia Dorothy Katharine Wadham, daughter of R. N. Wadham, of Newmarket, Suffolk. They were divorced in 2004. Together they had three children; two sons and a daughter:

- Hugo Bailie Rohan Palmer, 5th Baron Palmer (born 5 December 1980) who is a racehorse trainer based at Manor House Stables, near Malpas, Cheshire. The stables belong to former England footballer, Michael Owen. Palmer was previously based at Kremlin Cottage Stables in Newmarket, Suffolk. His notable horses include Galileo Gold (2000 Guineas and St James's Palace Stakes) and Covert Love (Irish Oaks and Prix de L'Opera)
- Hon. Edwina Laura Marguerite Palmer (born 20 February 1982)
- Hon. George Gordon Nottage Palmer (born 17 November 1985)

Palmer married secondly in 2006 Loraine McMurrey, a Houston heiress, and divorced in 2013.

== Personal life and death ==
Lord Palmer lived at Manderston, Duns, Berwickshire. He died from a stroke on 10 July 2023, at the age of 71.

== Arms ==
Coat of arms of Adrian Palmer, 4th Baron Palmer
Crest Upon a mount Vert in front of a palm tree Proper three escallops fessways Or. Escutcheon Per saltire Azure and Gules two palmers'staves in saltire between four escallops Or. Supporters On either side a palmer supporting with the exterior hand a palmer's staff Proper. Motto Per Crucem Ad Palmam (Through The Cross To The Palm)

== Notes ==
Peerage of the United Kingdom
Preceded by Raymond Palmer	Baron Palmer; 1990–2023; Member of the House of Lords (1990–1999)	Succeeded by Hugo Palmer
Parliament of the United Kingdom
New office created by the House of Lords Act 1999	Elected hereditary peer to the House of Lords under the House of Lords Act 1999; 1999–2023	Succeeded by The Lord Meston
