= Ascot, Berkshire =

Town in Berkshire, England

Coordinates: 51°24′30″N 0°40′15″W

Ascot
- Town
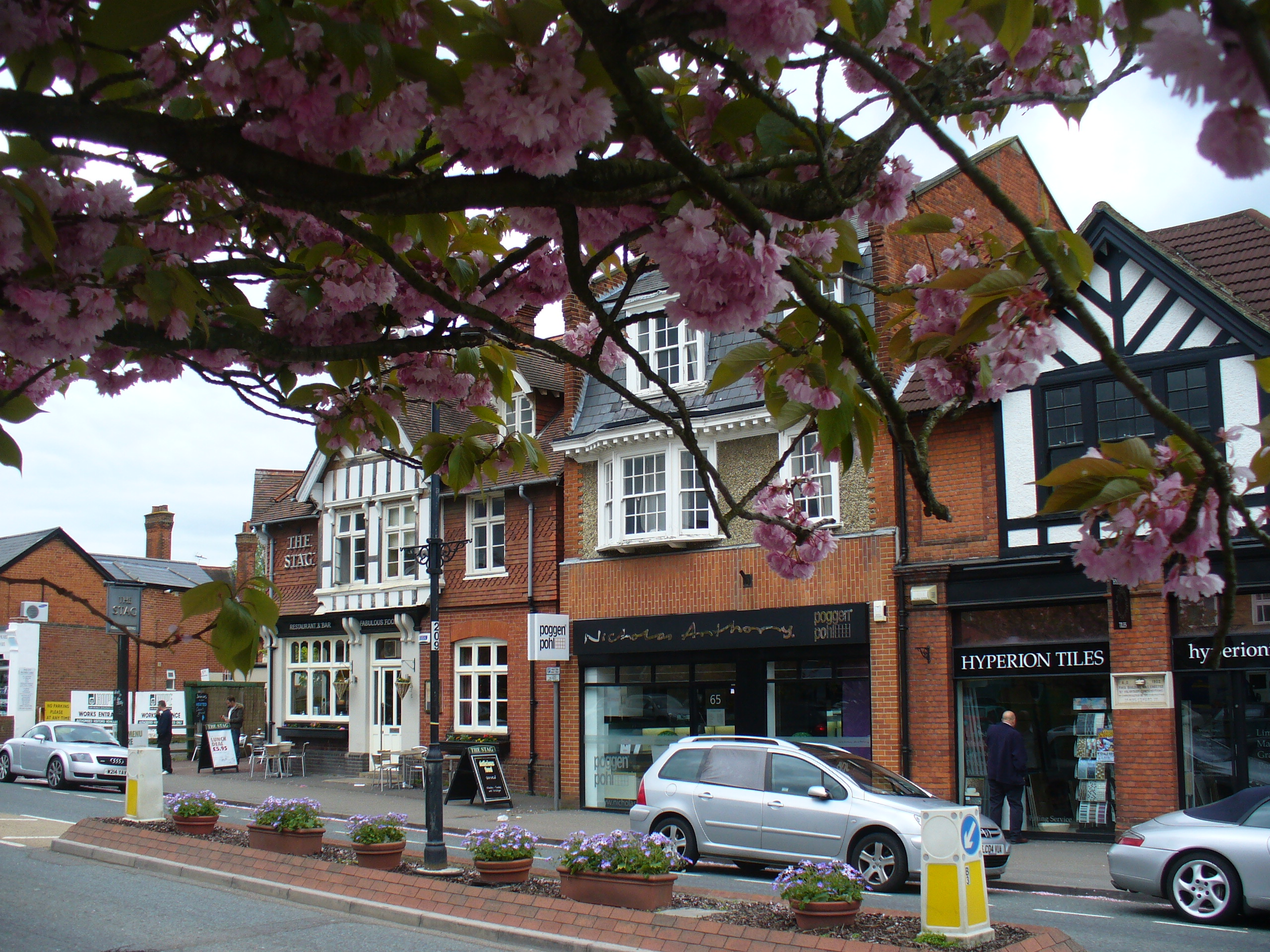
- High Street, Ascot

- Location within Berkshire
- Population: 11,603 (2001 census; with Sunninghill)
- OS grid reference: SU925685
- Civil parish: Sunninghill and Ascot
- Unitary authority: Windsor and Maidenhead
- Ceremonial county: Berkshire
- Region: South East
- Country: England
- Sovereign state: United Kingdom
- Post town: Ascot
- Postcode district: SL5
- Dialling code: 01344
- Police: Thames Valley
- Fire: Royal Berkshire
- Ambulance: South Central
- UK Parliament: Windsor; Maidenhead

Ascot (/ˈæskət, -ɒt/) is a town in the Royal Borough of Windsor and Maidenhead, in Berkshire, England. It is 6 miles (9.7 km) south of Windsor, 4 miles (6.4 km) east of Bracknell and 25 miles (40 km) west of London.

It is most notable as the location of Ascot Racecourse, home of the Royal Ascot meeting. Its average house price of £1,019,451, as of June 2021, makes it the 13th most expensive town in England. It is also among the ten most expensive towns in Britain to rent a property. The town comprises three areas: Ascot itself, North Ascot and South Ascot. It is in the civil parish of Sunninghill and Ascot.

== Etymology ==
The name 'Ascot' derives from the Old English ēast (east) and cot (cottage). Ascott-under-Wychwood (Oxfordshire), Ascott in Buckinghamshire, Eastcote in London and Eastcott in Wiltshire have the same etymology.

== Governance ==
Ascot is in the district administered by the unitary authority of the Royal Borough of Windsor and Maidenhead. Ascot, South Ascot and a small part of North Ascot are in the civil parish of Sunninghill and Ascot, although most of North Ascot is in the civil parish of Winkfield.

== Churches ==
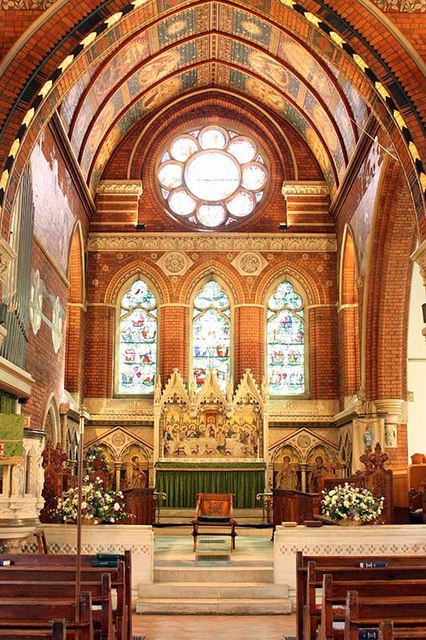
Chancel of All Saints' parish church

=== Church of England ===
The Church of England parish church of All Saints, Ascot Heath is a red-brick Gothic Revival building designed by Thomas Rushforth and built in 1864. It has a richly decorated interior. The east window of its chancel is a Jesse window with stained glass made by C.E. Kempe & Co in 1907. Above it is a rose window by Hardman & Co. The Church of England parish church of All Souls, South Ascot is another red-brick Gothic Revival building. It was designed by John Loughborough Pearson and built in 1896–97. It has a central tower with a pyramidal roof. Its nave has aisles of four bays. The ceilings of the chancel, baptistry and the crossing under the tower are rib vaulted. All Souls' is a Grade II* listed building. Ascot Priory was founded in 1861 for the Society of the Most Holy Trinity. It has buildings designed by the architects Charles Buckeridge, William Butterfield, George Gilbert Scott and Leonard Stokes.

=== Roman Catholic ===
The Roman Catholic church of St Francis is also a red-brick Gothic Revival building. It was designed by the Roman Catholic priest and architect Alexander Scoles, built in 1889 and has an apsidal chancel.

== Local schools ==
Independent senior schools in the area include Heathfield School (an all-girls boarding school), The Marist School (a private Catholic girls school 2–18 with mixed nursery), St George's School (a private girls senior school recently attended by Princess Beatrice of York), St Mary's School, a Catholic all-girls boarding school (which Princess Caroline of Monaco attended), located in South Ascot and LVS Ascot, which is located down the road from Ascot Racecourse. Papplewick is also based in Ascot. The local state secondary school in the Ascot area is Charters School in nearby Sunningdale.

== Amenities ==
Facilities tend to be geared towards the racecourse, but there is a small range of shops in the wide High Street. Most of the expected facilities one would expect to find in a small town are here, including a supermarket, petrol station and many cafes, a Subway, Tesco Express and Sainsbury's Local). Most buildings are post-war with flats above the ground floor retail space. Heatherwood Hospital (filming location for Carry On Matron) was at the western edge of the town.

== Transport ==
Ascot railway station is at the junction of the Waterloo to Reading line with the Ascot–Ash Vale line. Services operate to London Waterloo to Reading, Bagshot, Aldershot and Guildford.

The station was built originally by the London and South Western Railway and is now managed by South Western Railway, which also operates all services that stop here. As a consequence of the frequent service on this line, Ascot is now a commuter centre in both directions (westwards to Reading and eastwards to London).

Thames Velley Buses and White Bus Services operate local bus routes, which connect the town with Bracknell, Dedworth, Sunningdale, Slough, Windsor, Windsor Great Park and Heathrow Airport Terminal 5. Reading Buses operates a service to and from Legoland.

== Economy ==
Ascot Racecourse employs over 70 full-time staff, which increases temporarily to 6,000 during Royal Ascot week. The village has a variety of businesses located at the Ascot Business Park, opened in 2008, including the UK headquarters of global toy manufacturer Jakks Pacific, in addition to numerous small and medium enterprises. The Chartered Institute of Building, a professional body for those working in the construction industry and built environment, is also based in Ascot.

== Sport and leisure ==
=== Royal Ascot week ===
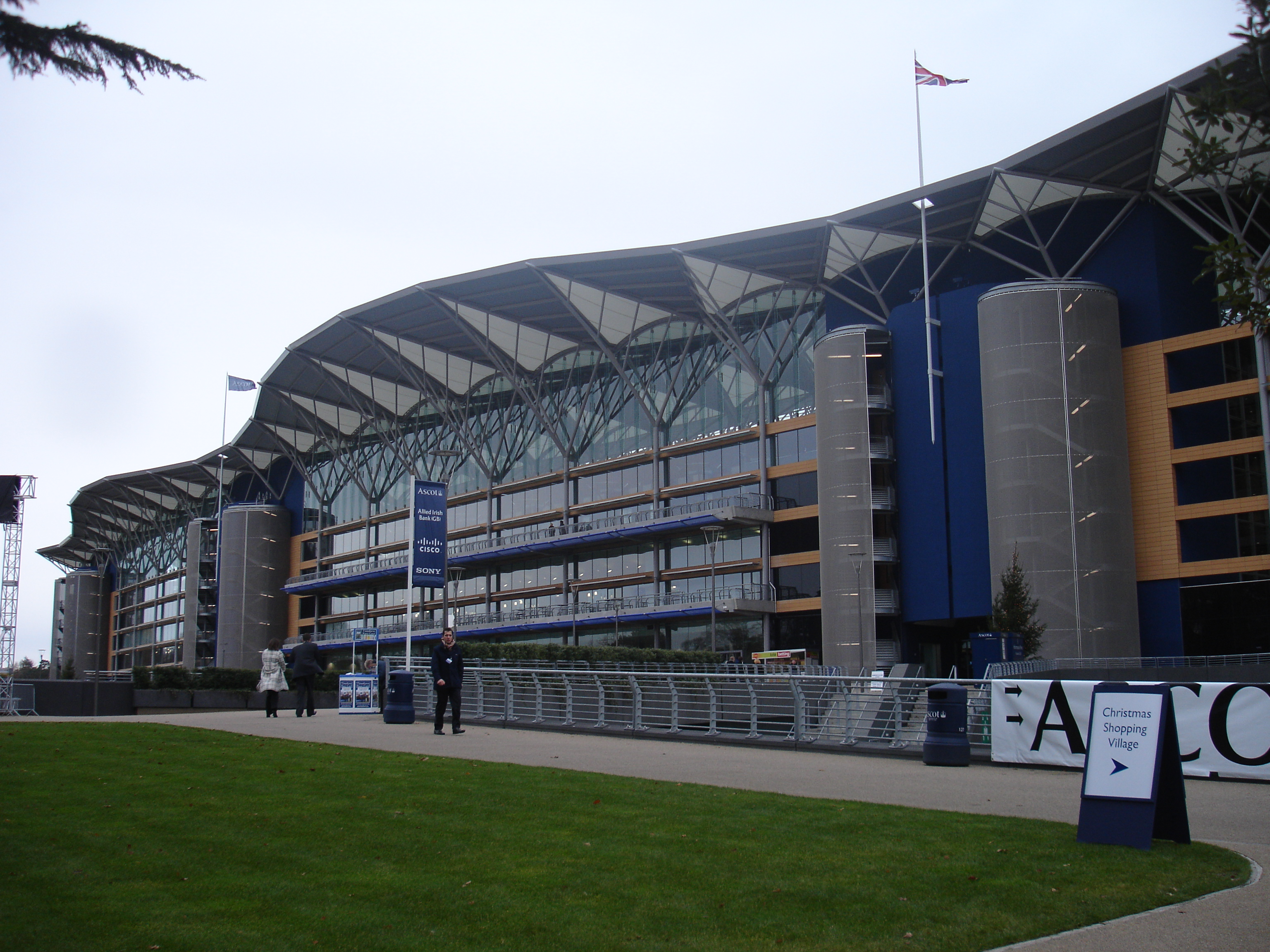
The new grandstand at Royal Ascot

The centrepiece of Ascot's year is held in June; Royal Ascot is arguably the world's most famous race meeting, dating back to 1711. The British royal family attend the meeting, arriving each day in a procession of horse-drawn carriages from Windsor Castle through Windsor Great Park and the village of Cheapside. It is a major event in the British social calendar. The course is still owned by the Crown.

=== Other sports ===
Ascot has a non-League football club, Ascot United F.C., and the Royal Ascot Cricket Club which play at the racecourse. Royal Ascot Golf Club is located next to the racecourse.

== Army Cadet Force ==
Ascot has an Army Cadet Force unit, 4 Platoon Ascot. The unit, being badged as Irish Guards (due to the unit belonging to A Company, Berkshire ACF; the company currently badged to the Household Division), means that the unit regularly sees Irish Guards events such as the Saint Patrick's Day Parade, and even has the privilege of taking part in an Irish Guards ACF skills competition, run by the battalion. It actively recruits from the local and surrounding area. The unit used to parade at Ascot Racecourse, however, they were evicted due to an appeal made by the racecourse owners. They now temporarily parade at Sunningdale Parish Hall, Broomhill Lane.

== Notable residents ==
- King Vajiravudh (Rama VI) (1881–1925), former King of Thailand, lived here prior to his accession
- Jake Ball (1991–), Welsh rugby player
- Boris Berezovsky (1946–2013), exiled Russian tycoon, lived and died in Ascot
- Josh Cuthbert (1992–), singer of Union J
- Chris Evans (1966–), presenter, businessman and producer for radio and television, lives in Ascot
- Sarah Harding (1981–2021), singer of Girls Aloud, born in Ascot
- Nick Hendrix (1985–), actor, born in Ascot
- John Lennon (1940–1980) and Ringo Starr (1940–) of the Beatles, successively lived at Tittenhurst Park, Ascot
- Henry Liddell (1811–1898), classical scholar and former Dean of Christ Church, Oxford, lived in Ascot in his last years and died there
- Camilla Luddington (1983–), actress, born and raised in Ascot
- Marti Pellow (1965–), singer of Wet Wet Wet, lives in Ascot
- Adam Roberts (1965–), science fiction author, lives in North Ascot
- Marie-José Villiers (1916–2015), British-born Belgian countess, British spy during World War II
- Noahfinnce (1999–), singer-songwriter and YouTuber, born and lived in Ascot

== Sources ==
- Ditchfield, P. H.; Page, William, eds. (1923). A History of the County of Berkshire. Vol. 3. London: Victoria County History. pp. 134–136.
- Pevsner, Nikolaus (2002) [1966]. Berkshire. The Buildings of England. New Haven; London: Yale University Press. pp. 68–70. ISBN 978-0-300-09582-1.
