= Robert Pye (Roundhead) =

English politician

Sir Robert Pye (ca. 1620 – 1701) was an English politician who sat in the House of Commons at various times between 1640 and 1660. He fought on the Parliamentary side in the English Civil War. He was a member of the aristocratic Pye Family.

== Biography ==
Pye was the son of Sir Robert Pye the Elder, Auditor of the Exchequer, and his wife Mary Croker, daughter of John Croker of Batsford in Gloucestershire.

In December 1640, Pye was elected Member of Parliament for Woodstock in the Long Parliament. He was knighted by 1642. In the Civil War, he chose the Parliamentary side and became colonel of Horse in General Fairfax's regiment. In the course of the war he besieged his father's mansion at Faringdon in Berkshire (now Oxfordshire), which the latter had allowed the Royalists to garrison. In 1648 he was excluded from parliament under Pride's Purge.

Pye was elected MP for Berkshire for the First Protectorate Parliament in 1654 and for the Third Protectorate Parliament in 1659. He was involved in the movement for the Restoration, being one of its treasurers. In 1660 he presented a petition from the county of Berkshire, complaining of the lack of a settled form of government and as a result was committed to the Tower of London for a breach of privilege. He moved for Habeas Corpus, but judge Richard Newdigate decided that the court of King's Bench did not have the power to discharge him. When General Monck came to London, MPs passed a vote to release Pye from prison. In 1660, Pye was elected Member of Parliament for Berkshire in the Convention Parliament and after the Restoration he was nominated equerry to the king.

== Family ==
Pye married Anne, eldest daughter of the famous parliamentarian, John Hampden, and had a family of three sons and one daughter, including Richard Pye MP and Edmund Pye MD, the great-grandfather of the poet laureate, Henry James Pye. Pye inherited his father's ruinous estates in 1662 and eventually died in December 1701 and was buried in All Saints' Church, Faringdon. His son Richard would marry Barbara Allington, and their son Richard would marry Maria Josephina von Saxe-Zeitz, a descendant of Frederick William, Elector of Brandenburg.

Parliament of England
Preceded by William Lenthall; William Herbert	Member of Parliament for Woodstock; 1640–1648; With: William Lenthall	Succeeded by William Lenthall
Preceded by Samuel Dunch; Vincent Goddard; Thomas Wood	Member of Parliament for Berkshire; 1654; With: George Purefoy; Edmund Dunch; John Dunch; John Southby	Succeeded by William Trumball; Edmund Dunch; William Hide; John Dunch; John Southby
Preceded by William Trumball; Edmund Dunch; William Hide; John Dunch; John Southby	Member of Parliament for Berkshire; 1659; With: John Dunch	Succeeded by Not represented in Restored Rump
Preceded by Not represented in Restored Rump	Member of Parliament for Berkshire; 1660; With: Richard Powle	Succeeded by Richard Powle; John Lovelace
