= Gordon Palmer =

British aristocrat

Colonel Sir Gordon William Nottage Palmer KCVO OBE TD (18 July 1918 – 3 July 1989) was Lord Lieutenant of Berkshire from 1978 to 1989, High Sheriff of Berkshire, 1965, and Chairman of Huntley and Palmer Foods, Reading, Berkshire.

He was the younger son of Cecil Palmer, 2nd Baron Palmer, by his American wife Marguerite McKinley, daughter of William McKinley Osborne, a United States Army general. He was educated at Eton College and Christ Church, Oxford.

== Military service ==
He was commissioned into the Royal Artillery and by the end of the Second World War he was a lieutenant-colonel. After the war he served in the Territorial Army and was promoted to colonel in 1956.

== Family ==
Colonel Palmer married, 6 May 1950, in Duns, Scottish Borders, Lorna Eveline Hope, daughter of Charles William Hugh Bailie, of Manderston, Berwickshire, by which marriage the Palmer family came into possession of Manderston. At the time of his marriage he was resident at 'Fernhurst' at Pinkneys Green in Berkshire. Later, he lived at Foudry House in Stratfield Mortimer.

They had two sons:

- Adrian Palmer, 4th Baron Palmer (1951–2023)
- Hon. Mark Palmer (b. 1954)

Honorary titles
Preceded by Sir John Smith	Lord Lieutenant of Berkshire; 1978–1989	Succeeded by John Ronald Henderson
