= Draper baronets =

Extinct baronetcy in the Baronetage of England

The Draper Baronetcy, of Sunninghill in the County of Berkshire, was a title in the Baronetage of England. It was created on 9 June 1660 for Thomas Draper, High Sheriff of Berkshire from 1660 to 1661. The title became extinct on his death in 1703.

== Draper baronets, of Sunninghill (1660) ==
- Sir Thomas Draper, 1st Baronet (died 1703)
