= Sunninghill and Ascot =

Coordinates: 51°25′N 0°39′W

- Civil parish
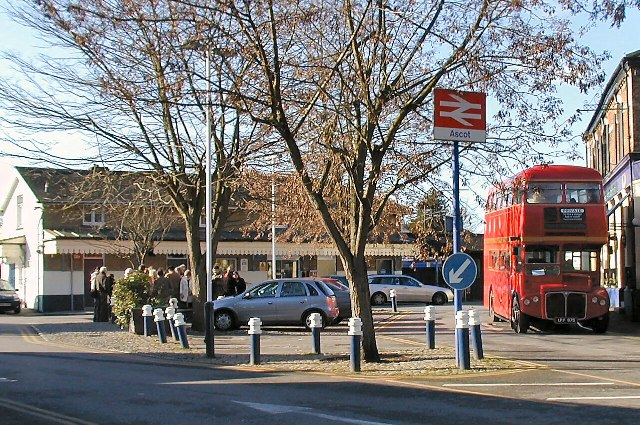
- London Routemaster at Ascot Railway Station

- Location within Berkshire
- Population: 11,603 (2001); 12,744 (2011 Census)
- OS grid reference: SU9567
- Civil parish: Sunninghill and Ascot
- Unitary authority: Windsor and Maidenheadt
- Ceremonial county: Berkshire
- Region: South East
- Country: England
- Sovereign state: United Kingdom
- Post town: Ascot
- Postcode district: SL5
- Dialling code: 01344
- Police: Thames Valley
- Fire: Royal Berkshire
- Ambulance: South Central
- UK Parliament: Windsor

Sunninghill and Ascot is a civil parish in the Royal Borough of Windsor and Maidenhead and takes up most of the south-east corner of the English county of Berkshire. It covers the town of Ascot, and the village of Sunninghill including the neighbourhoods Cheapside and South Ascot. As well as part of the village of North Ascot.

== History ==
Before 12 August 2004, the civil parish was Sunninghill, a church on its small hilltop has existed verifiably since 1120 and possibly more than a century before, that is, in Anglo Saxon England. Ascot was a purely forested rural part of Winkfield until its chapel was upgraded to a church in the late 19th century. Its succession of churches reflects the wealth and breadth of Christianity of the combined as much as its population expansion:

1. Cheapside Methodist Chapel's foundation stone was laid in 1862.
2. All Saints’ Church (C of E) in Ascot near the Heatherwood Roundabout was consecrated in 1864. Further building work took place in 1870 and 1890, while murals and paintings were added at various times.
3. The first sod was cut for St. Saviour’s (C of E) in South Ascot in 1884 with the first service being held in the following year. The building was relatively small and was mostly constructed of tin.
4. The building of All Souls (C of E) in South Ascot was largely paid for by the 1st Baron Stanmore. It was consecrated in 1897, and unsurprisingly it soon attracted the congregation from St. Saviour’ which was eventually demolished.
5. The Stoner family and other wealthy Catholic neighbours originally travelled to Binfield Park to hear Mass and take the sacraments. It was the Stoner family who contributed a significant sum towards the building of St. Francis of Assisi Church in South Ascot. The foundation stone was laid in 1888 and the consecration took place in the following year.
6. A second Methodist Chapel appeared in 1881 in the Mission Hall at the Terrace, Sunninghill.

== Transport and character ==
It has since 1857 one railway station, Ascot, on the Waterloo to Reading Line. A former part of Windsor Forest it does not have dual carriageways; part of the high street of Ascot is briefly dualled to one side. Less than 2 miles (3.2 km) east and south is the A30 which further beyond feeds into the motorway network, the M3 to the south and the M25 to the north.
