= Joseph Cox (high sheriff) =

High Sheriff of Berkshire 91697–1753)

- Born: 1697; Stanford in the Vale, England
- Died: 1753

Joseph Cox (1697–1753) was High Sheriff of Berkshire.

== Biography ==
Joseph was the son of Joseph Cox of Cox's Hall, Stanford-in-the-Vale, he was educated at John Roysse's Free School in Abingdon, (now Abingdon School) c.1707. He received his later education at Christ Church, Oxford.

On 12 January 1738, he was appointed High Sheriff of Berkshire. In 1690 the Cox family built the grand house of the village, Cox's Hall and its adjacent Dovecote and also presented a silver flagon to the Church for their thanks to Almighty God, for the recovery of their three children from smallpox.

Political offices
Preceded by Matthew Weymondesould	High Sheriff of Berkshire; 1738	Succeeded by William Trumbull

== See also ==
- List of Old Abingdonians
