= Samuel Dunch =

English politician

Samuel Dunch (1593–1668) was an English politician who sat in the House of Commons in 1621 and 1653.

Dunch was the son of Edmund Dunch of Little Wittenham in Berkshire (now Oxfordshire). He matriculated at Magdalen College, Oxford on 11 November 1608, aged 15 and was awarded BA on 23 January 1612. He was a student of Gray's Inn in 1611. In 1621 he was elected MP for Wallingford. He was also a justice of the peace and served as High Sheriff of Berkshire in 1629. He lived at Pusey in Berkshire (now Oxfordshire).

Dunch was an uncle of Oliver Cromwell. In 1653, he was nominated to the Barebones Parliament as MP for Berkshire.

Dunch married Dulcibella Moore, daughter of John Moore, Serjeant-at-law, by licence dated 28 May 1617. Through her, he inherited North Baddesley Manor. Amongst their children was John Dunch MP. Dunch's brother, Sir William Dunch was also MP for Berkshire.

== Notes ==
Parliament of England
Preceded by William Reynolds; George Symonds	Member of Parliament for Wallingford; 1621; With: Sir George Simeon	Succeeded by Sir George Simeon; Sir Edward Howard
Preceded by Sir Henry Neville; Henry Marten	Member of Parliament for Berkshire; 1653; With: Vincent Goddard; Thomas Wood	Succeeded by Edmund Dunch; Sir Robert Pye; John Dunch; John Southby; George Purefoy
