= John Dunch =

English politician

John Dunch (1630–1668) was an English politician who sat in the House of Commons between 1654 and 1659.

John was the second son of Samuel Dunch of Pusey in Berkshire (now Oxfordshire) and his wife, Dulcibella, the daughter of Sir John Moore of East Ilsley in Berkshire. He was the brother-in-law of the wife of Richard Cromwell, Lord Protector of England, Scotland and Ireland. He lived in Pusey and also at North Baddesley in Hampshire.

In 1654, he was elected Member of Parliament for Berkshire in the First Protectorate Parliament. He was re-elected MP for Berkshire in 1656 for the Second Protectorate Parliament and again in 1659 for the Third Protectorate Parliament.

Parliament of England
Preceded by Samuel Dunch; Vincent Goddard; Thomas Wood	Member of Parliament for Berkshire; 1654–1659; With: Edmund Dunch 1654–1656; John Southby 1654–1656; Sir Robert Pye 1654, 1659; George Purefoy 1654; William Trumball 1656; William Hide 1656	Succeeded by Henry Marten; Henry Neville
