= Sir William Dunch =

English politician (1578–1611)

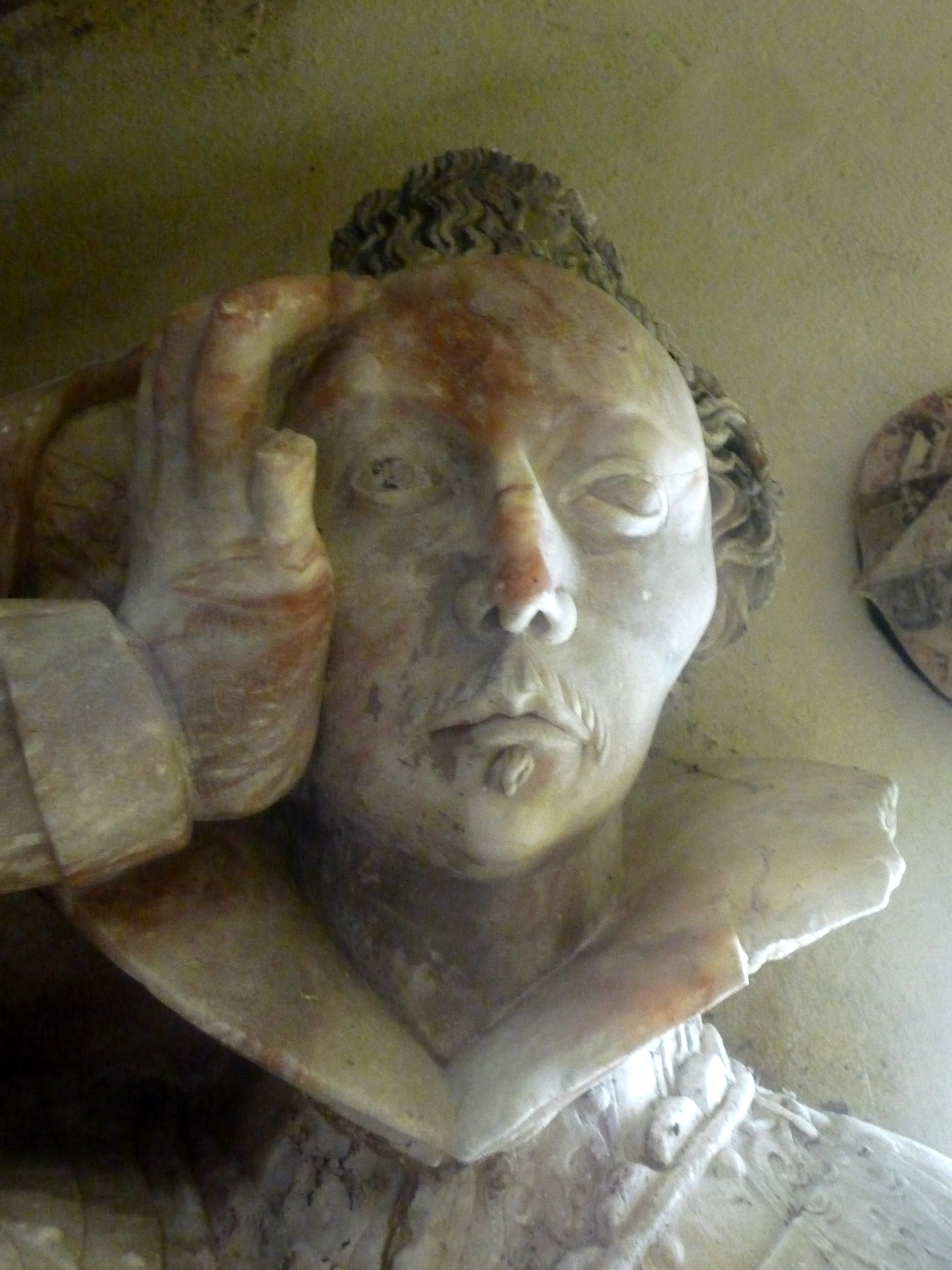
Sir William Dunch from his memorial at St Peter's Church, Little Wittenham, Oxfordshire

Sir William Dunch (1578–1611) of Brightwell, Berkshire was an English politician during the reign of King James I.

He was the son of Sir Edmund Dunch (1551–1623) and graduated from Balliol College, Oxford in 1595 before entering Gray's Inn. He married Mary Cromwell in 1599, the daughter of Sir Henry Cromwell and aunt to Oliver Cromwell. It is believed that the variant name for the rounded hills Wittenham Clumps (Mother Dunch's Buttocks) near the Dunch's family seat at Little Wittenham is associated with her. He was knighted in 1603 by King James I.

Dunch represented Wallingford in Berkshire (now Oxfordshire) as an MP from 1604 to 1611.

William's brother Samuel Dunch (1593–1666) represented Wallingford in 1620, as did William's son Edmund (1602–1678).
