= Edmund Dunch (Elizabethan) =

Kingdom of England politician

Sir Edmund Dunch (1551–1623) was an English MP and High Sheriff.

He was born the son of William Dunch (1508–1597) of Little Wittenham in Berkshire (now Oxfordshire). He attended Magdalen College, Oxford with his younger brother Walter.

He was returned as MP for Wallingford in Berkshire (now Oxfordshire) in 1571. His father had sat for the same seat in the previous parliament, the family being prominent among the local gentry. In 1572 he sat for Wootton Bassett, a seat in the patronage of Sir John Thynne. He served as High Sheriff of Berkshire in 1587-8, 1592-3, 1603-4.

He married Anne (d. 1628), only daughter and heir of Nicholas Fettiplace (d. 1569) of Kentwood, Tilehurst, Berkshire in 1576. By this marriage he acquired the manor of Kentwood. The couple had 2 sons and 3 daughters. His sons William and Samuel both also represented Wallingford as MPs.
