= Philip Wroughton (insurance executive) =

Lord Lieutenant of Berkshire (1995–2008)

Sir Philip Lavallin Wroughton KCVO KStJ (19 April 1933 – 7 November 2020) was the Lord Lieutenant of Berkshire from 1995 until 2008.

== Early life ==
Wroughton was born on 19 April 1933, the son of Michael Lavallin Wroughton (alias Puxley) Esq of Woolley Park at Chaddleworth in Berkshire and his wife, Elizabeth Angela Rate. He was educated at Eton College.

As part of National Service, he was commissioned into the King's Royal Rifle Corps on 26 April 1952 as a second lieutenant. He was given the service number 422277. On 14 October 1953, he transferred from the Regular Army national service list to the Territorial Army with seniority from 26 April 1952. He was made an acting lieutenant on 7 January 1954, and promoted to that rank on 19 April 1956 with seniority from 7 January 1954. He was made an acting captain on 19 May 1959, and promoted to that rank on 19 April 1960 with seniority from 19 May 1959. He transferred from the Active List on 14 February 1961, effectively leaving the military.

== Career ==
He worked in the City of London, eventually becoming Vice-Chairman of one of the World's largest insurance and investment management businesses, Marsh & McLennan Companies of New York City. He inherited his father's Woolley estate in 1972.

== Death ==
Wroughton died on 7 November 2020, at the age of 87.

== Honours ==
In 1974, Wroughton was the third nominee for the appointment of High Sheriff of Berkshire. In 1975, he was the second nominee for that appointment. In 1976, he was the first nominee for the appointment and so, on 11 March 1977, he was appointed High Sheriff of Berkshire. In 1994, he was commissioned as a Deputy Lieutenant to the Lord Lieutenant of Berkshire. On 9 May 1995, he was appointed Lord Lieutenant of Berkshire. He retired as Lord Lieutenant in April 2008.

On 20 November 1995, he was appointed Knight of the Venerable Order of Saint John (KStJ). He was appointed Knight Commander of the Royal Victorian Order (KCVO) in the 2008 New Year Honours.

Honorary titles
| Preceded by John Marriott | High Sheriff of Berkshire; 1977–1978 | Succeeded by Ian Donald Cameron |
| Preceded by John Ronald Henderson | Lord Lieutenant of Berkshire; 1995–2008 | Succeeded by Mary Bayliss |
