= Edmund Dunch (Roundhead) =

English Member of Parliament

Edmund Dunch, 1st Baron Burnell (1602–1678) was an English Member of Parliament who supported the Parliamentary cause before and during the English Civil War. During the Interregnum he sat as a member of parliament. In 1659, after the Protectorate and before the Restoration, regaining his seat in the Rump he also sat in Committee of Safety. After the restoration of the monarchy he was not exempted under the Act of Pardon and Oblivion but the titles granted to him under the Protectorate were not recognised under the restored monarchy of Charles II.

== Biography ==
Edmund Dunch was elected Member of Parliament (MP) for Berkshire in 1624 and was re-elected in 1625 and 1626. In 1628 he was elected MP for Wallingford (then Berkshire (now Oxfordshire)). and Sheriff of Berkshire in 1633–1634.

A Royal warrant was issued for his arrest in 1639 for failure to pay ship money in support of King Charles I. John Hampden represented him at his trial, and he escaped punishment. See document ACC/0447 at the London Metropolitan Archives. He was re-elected to serve for Wallingford in the Short Parliament of 1640. He also represented Wallingford in the Long Parliament that first sat in 1640. He supported the parliamentary cause in the Civil War, signing the Protestation in 1641. His manor and possessions at Little Wittenham were taken from him by the king and given to Thomas Blagge, governor of Wallingford Castle. In 1644, Dunch directed a parliamentary committee to send military forces into areas around Oxfordshire and Berkshire, including Wallingford. He took the oath prescribed in the Act enforcing the Solemn League and Covenant in 1647. He was on the Parliamentary Committee for Compounding with Delinquents that levied fines on the estates of Royalists. In 1648, was a Protester against any agreement with the King Charles.

After the capture of Charles I, Dunch survived Pride's Purge of MPs who did not want Charles tried and was part of the Rump Parliament. In 1654, he was elected MP for Berkshire in the First Protectorate Parliament) and in 1656 he was re-elected MP for Berkshire in the Second Protectorate Parliament. He was governor of Wallingford Castle. John Hedges states that Dunch was selected to be a member of Cromwell's Other House in 1658 as Baron Burnell, however George Cokayne while detailing Cromwell's granting of the Barony to Dunch does not mention his membership of the Other House and he is not included in Cobbett's list of members of that house.

After Oliver Cromwell's son Richard resigned from power as second Lord Protector, Dunch may have joined the Committee of Safety in 1659. A fine was levied against Dunch for non-attendance at Parliament in 1659 but later withdrawn. After the restoration Charles II did not recognise Dunch's baronage (the only one made by Cromwell not renewed by Charles II), but unlike the surviving Regicides, Dunch was not exempted from the general pardon granted under Indemnity and Oblivion Act. He was Sheriff of Oxfordshire in 1667–68.

== Family ==
Edmund Dunch was the son an heir of Sir William Dunch of Little Wittenham, Berkshire (d. 22 January 1611), by Mary, daughter of Sir Henry Williams (alias Cromwell) (grandfather of the Protector Oliver Cromwell). This made him a cousin of John Hampden and Oliver Cromwell.

Edmund Dunch married Bridget daughter of Anthony Hungerford of Down Ampney in Gloucestershire, and inherited £60,000 on her father's death. His son Hungerford Dunch (1639–1680) was also an MP for Wallingford, as was his grandson Edmund Dunch, the last of the male line of the Dunches.

== Notes ==
Parliament of England
Preceded by Sir Richard Lovelace; Sir Robert Knollys	Member of Parliament for Berkshire; 1624–1626; With: Richard Harrison 1624; Francis Knollys 1625; John Fettiplace 1626	Succeeded by John Fettiplace; Sir Richard Harrison
Preceded by Sir Anthony Forrest; Unton Croke	Member of Parliament for Wallingford; 1626–1628; With: Robert Knollys	Parliament suspended until 1640
Vacant Parliament suspended since 1629	Member of Parliament for Wallingford; 1640–1653; With: Unton Croke 1640; Thomas Howard 1640–1644; Robert Packer 1645–1648	Not represented in Barebones Parliament
Preceded by Samuel Dunch; Vincent Goddard; Thomas Wood	Member of Parliament for Berkshire; 1654–1656; With: George Purefoy 1654; Sir Robert Pye 1654; John Dunch; John Southby; William Trumball 1656; William Hide 1656	Succeeded by John Dunch; Sir Robert Pye
