= William Dunch (1508–1597) =

English politician and judge

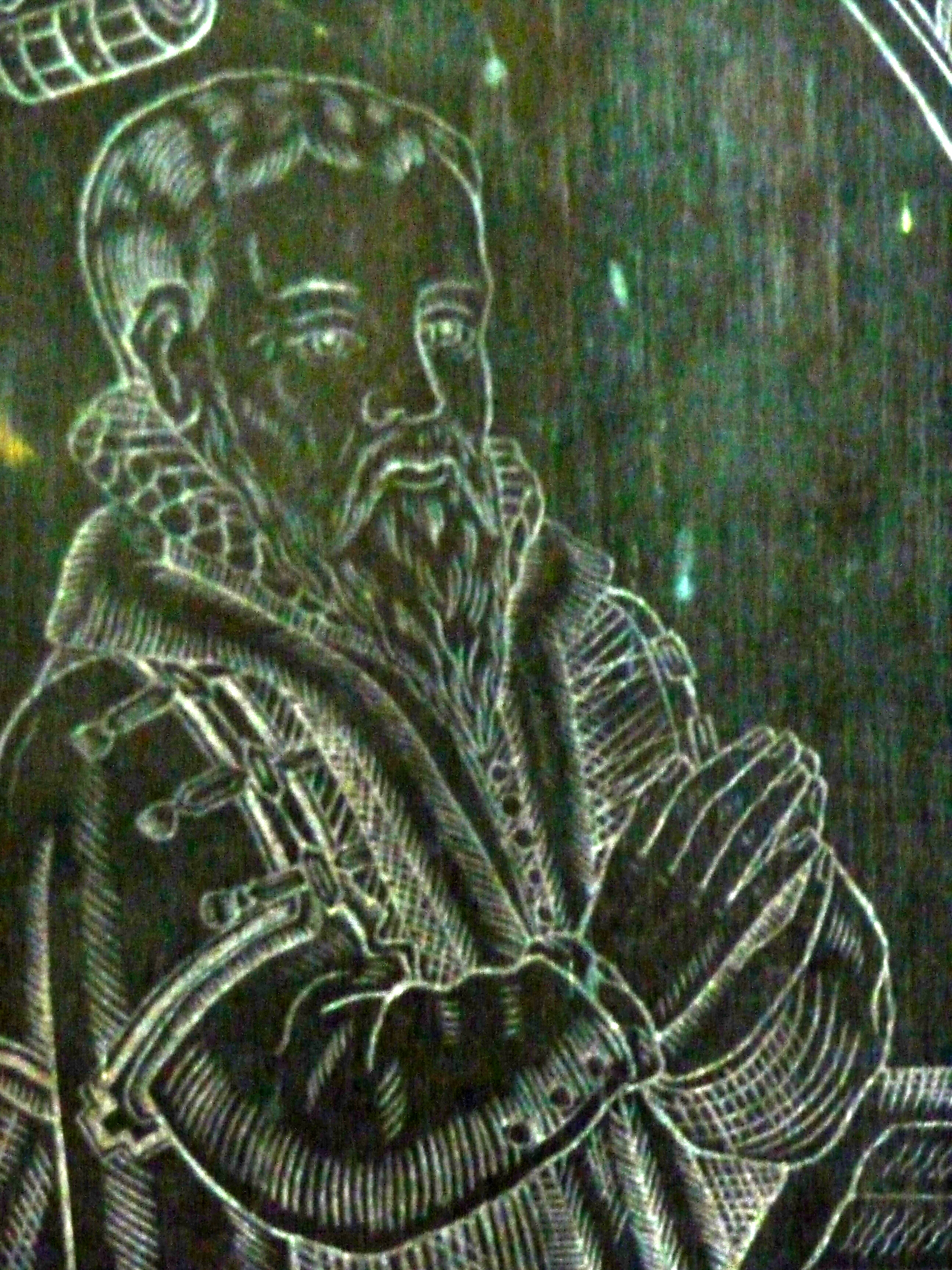
William Dunch pictured on his memorial plaque at St Peter's Church, Little Wittenham, Oxfordshire

William Dunch (1508–1597) was an English politician, a local official in the counties of Berkshire and Oxfordshire and Auditor of the Royal Mint for Kings Henry VIII and Edward IV.

== Political career ==
William represented Wallingford in Berkshire (now Oxfordshire) as an MP (1563–1571). He was High Sheriff of Berkshire (1570–1571) and also justice of the peace for Berkshire (1559–1577).

== Personal life ==
William bought the manor of Little Wittenham in 1552 from Edmund Peckham, and it became the family seat. He married Mary Barnes in 1547.

He was briefly imprisoned for unknown reasons in 1549.

His eldest son, Edmund, was also an MP, for Wallingford and then Wootton Bassett in Wiltshire. His second son, Walter, a lawyer, lived at Avebury Manor in Wiltshire, which William purchased for him in 1551. Walter sat for Dunwich, Suffolk; he died in 1594, before his father.
