= Joseph Mason Cox =

English physician (1763–1818)

Joseph Mason Cox (1763–1818) was an early nineteenth century English physician whose entire professional career was devoted to care and treatment of mentally ill people. Born in Bristol, the son of John Cox, he was apprenticed to a surgeon-apothecary around 1778. In 1783, he became an apprentice to James Padmore Noble, a surgeon to the Bristol Infirmary. The next year, he began to study medicine in London, followed by studies in Edinburgh, Scotland; in Paris, France; and in Leiden, Netherlands, where he received his medical degree in 1787. His thesis was titled “De Mania.”

Cox’s maternal grandfather owned Fishponds, a lunatic asylum near Bristol. The asylum had been established about 1738 and came to the elder Cox’s ownership about 1760. The elder Cox maintained the asylum until his death in 1779. His two daughters succeeded him as owners, and when one daughter died, John Cox and the surviving daughter became the owners. When John died in 1788, Joseph took over the asylum and managed it until his death in 1818. Fishponds continued to serve as an asylum until 1859.

== Physician ==
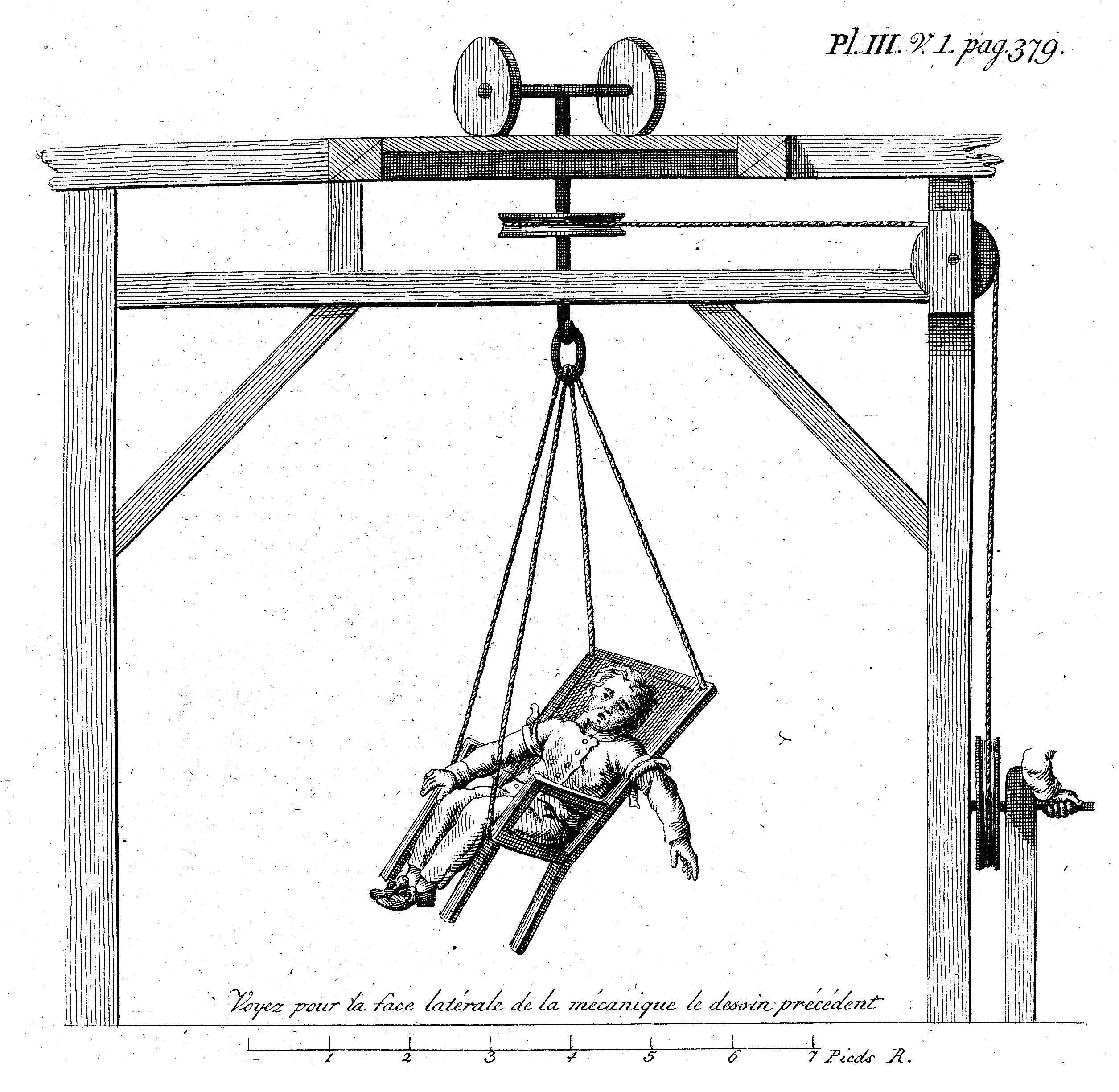
Illustration of the Cox' Swing

Joseph Cox published a book in 1804 which described his experiences in treating mental patients as both a madhouse keeper and a psychiatric consultant. The title page of the book reads Practical Observations on Insanity in which some suggestions are offered towards an Improved Mode of Treating Diseases of the Mind, and Some Rules Proposed which it is hoped may lead to a more Humane and successful Method of Cure. To which are subjoined, Remarks on Medical Jurisprudence as connected with Disease Intellect. The book had subsequent editions in 1806, 1811 and 1813, and was published in France, Germany and the United States.

The book begins with a description of a maniacal attack, which set forth Cox’s ideas as to the possible causes of insanity. Cox believed that kind and gentle management of lunatics was important but he did not eschew coercive measures such as using the straitjacket when necessary. He concluded that patient history taking and patient treatment should be individualized. He described the uses of hydrotherapy in both mania and melancholia, which he believed to be manifestations of the same illness. He warned of the dangers of patients harming themselves. He provided detailed descriptions of the various medications used, especially digitalis as an anti-maniacal remedy. Cox conveyed his ideas about protecting people from coercion into asylums and described how a physician must examine an individual before issuing a certificate of lunacy. His ideas on patients’ treatment were in keeping with other physicians at the time.

Cox introduced a new treatment called swinging to effect change in blood flow in the head and body, a practice that had been advocated by Erasmus Darwin (1731-1802), a physician and naturalist. The patient was suspended in a chair or bed and swung in an oscillatory or circular manner at varying tempos. Nausea, vomiting, and convulsions were produced but often refreshing sleep followed.

== Works ==
- Cox, Joseph Mason. Dissertatio medica inauguralis quaedam de mania complectens ... Leyden, 1787.
- Cox, Joseph Mason. Practical observations on insanity: in which some suggestions are offered towards an improved mode of treating diseases of the mind, and some rules proposed which it is hoped may lead to a more humane and successful method of cure; to which are subjoined remarks on medical jurisprudence as connected with diseased intellect. London, Baldwin, 1804.
