= William Milford Teulon =

English architect and landscape designer

William Milford Teulon (30 May 1823 – 23 June 1900, Leamington) was an English architect and landscape designer.

Teulon was born in 1823 in Greenwich, Kent, the son of a cabinet-maker from a French Huguenot family. He followed his elder brother Samuel Sanders Teulon (1812–1873) in becoming an architect. He travelled across continental Europe 1847–48.

== Commissions ==
He designed the park and gardens of Gunton Hall in Norfolk and did similar work at Althorp and Overstone Park.

William Teulon's only identified original architectural work was the design and execution of a substantial country house and ancillary buildings such as the coach house and stables at Overstone, Northamptonshire, for Samuel Jones Loyd in 1862–64. Chiefly the house was Lady Overstone's idea. In his published correspondence Lord Overstone decried the design and the architect alike. "We have fallen into the hands of an architect whose incapacity is the least of his faults," he wrote to a friend in 1863. His wife died while the house was nearing completion in 1864. Consequently, he lived out much of the remainder of his life at Lockinge House, Berkshire, the home of his daughter Harriet and her husband Robert Lindsay V.C., later made Lord (and Lady) Wantage in 1885. Overstone House was on the receiving end of much critical opprobrium from at least two noted architectural historians, Nikolaus Pevsner in his Buildings of England Northamptonshire ("a house of many styles.. [which].. almost defeats description" and "a terrible bastard Renaissance house"), and Mark Girouard in The Victorian Country House, Yale University Press 1979 ("drearily asymmetrical" – the full text deserves reading). It was listed by the Department of the Environment (now the Department for Digital, Culture, Media and Sport) at Grade II in 1983, principally for its then – 1860s – relatively novel cavity-wall construction. The House was all but destroyed by fire on 21 April 2001. It is still a roofless ruin in 2019, several schemes for its rehabilitation having fallen through. There is a current planning application for reconstruction and conversion to 14 apartments pending at Daventry District Council.

== Church restoration ==
Teulon founded the City Church and Churchyard Protection Society. He was involved in the restoration of a number of churches including St Matthias Old Church, where the puritan character of this Commonwealth church was altered through cladding in Kentish Ragstone and the removal of the preaching box.
