= History of the Scots Guards (1805–1913) =

This article details the history of the Scots Guards from 1805 to 1913. The Scots Guards (SG) is a regiment of the Guards Division of the British Army.

== Pre-Napoleonic wars history ==
The Scots Guards trace their origins back to 1642 when, by order of Charles I, the regiment was raised by Archibald Campbell, 1st Marquess of Argyll for service in Ireland, and was known as the Marquis of Argyll's Royal Regiment. After serving with the King in the Wars of the Three Kingdoms, the regiment was dispersed, but was reformed after the Restoration of the Monarchy as the Scottish Regiment of Foot Guards in 1662. In 1686, the regiment was brought on to the establishment of the English Army and was renamed by Queen Anne as the Third Regiment of Foot Guards.

== Napoleonic Wars ==
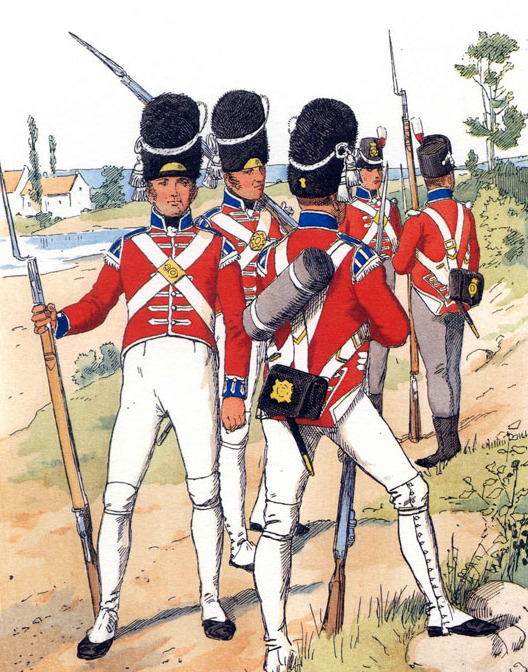
The 3rd Foot Guards in 1815. The three grenadiers in the foreground are wearing parade uniform and the two line infantrymen behind are in campaign dress.

In 1804, the United Kingdom's nemesis, Napoleon Bonaparte, became Emperor of the French. The following year the Third Coalition was formed against France and the 1st Battalion took part in the expedition to Hannover in 1805 at a time when Napoleon's armies burnt across the continent. In 1806 the Fourth Coalition against France was created and the following year the 1st Battalion took part in the second Battle of Copenhagen in Denmark, an expedition intended to prevent the Danish Fleet falling into the hands of the French. A combined British and Hannoverian Army under General Lord Cathcart besieged the Danish city while the Royal Navy bombarded the city. The operation was a success and the Danes surrendered their fleet of eighteen warships to the British.

In 1809 the Fifth Coalition was formed against France, though this was much smaller than previous coalitions, consisting of just Austria and the United Kingdom. That same year the 1st Battalion made its way to the Iberian Peninsula where it was to take part in the Peninsular War in Portugal and Spain. On 12 May, the 1st Battalion took part in the crossing of the Douro River, an operation that ended so successfully that the French Army were in full retreat to Amarante after the actions in Porto and its surrounding areas.

In late July, the 3rd Foot Guards took part in the Battle of Talavera, one of the bloodiest and most bitter of engagements during the war. The British were commanded by Lieutenant-General Arthur Wellesley, a man who gained immortal fame in the history of the British Army, and would soon gain the honour Duke of Wellington for Talavera. The British-Spanish Army numbered about 50,000 and the 1st Battalion was part of the 1st Brigade of the 1st Division, while the French numbered over 40,000. The battle that ensued was ferocious, with the British defenders receiving the first attack on the night of 27 July, an attack that nearly forced the British off the Cerro de Medellin, a hill to the left of the 3rd Foot Guards' position, but a counter-attack successfully repulsed the French. In the early hours of 28 July the French attacked once more, meeting stiff resistance from the British defenders. At the Cerro position, the British poured a relentless and overwhelming fire into the advancing French formations, and repulsed the French, inflicting heavy casualties on them. Further French attacks took place, at one point, the Foot Guards distinguished themselves greatly when they poured a devastating fire into the French ranks, though the Guards advanced after the fleeing French and in doing so became the target of a French artillery battery and French infantry who duly ripped into the Guards, causing hundreds of casualties. However, despite suffering terribly, the Guards managed to reform and, along with other infantry battalions, commenced yet another professional and overwhelming fire to repulse a large French counter-attack, which caused quite horrific casualties for the French. The Battle of Talavera was bloody and ended in victory for the British though at a terrible price, with over 5,000 men being killed or wounded, while their French opponents lost over 7,000 men. For its role in the battle, the regiment won its fifth battle honour.

Also that year, the 2nd Battalion's flank companies took part in the disastrous Walcheren Expedition in the Low Countries, a campaign that would suffer many casualties from disease rather than the bullet of an enemy, through Walcheren Fever, which affected the troops that suffered from it so severely that many thousands of the troops still suffered from it years afterwards, and led to the Duke of Wellington stating that he did not want any unit that served in the Walcheren Campaign to serve with him.

In 1810, the 1st Battalion took part in the Battle of Buçaco in which a British-Portuguese Army of about 50,000 soundly defeated a numerically superior French force before marching to the Lines of Torres Vedras, a series of trenches and redoubts designed to protect Lisbon, and where the British again defeated the French, forcing the French Army to withdraw. The following year, in March, companies of the 2nd Battalion, who were now deployed to the Peninsula, took part in the Battle of Barrosa in an attempt to lift the siege of Cádiz, and soundly defeated the French relatively quickly, and for its actions, won the regiment its sixth battle honour.

In May 1811, the 1st Battalion took part in the Battle of Fuentes de Onoro which ended in yet another British victory and gained the regiment its seventh battle honour. The following year, in January, the 1st Battalion took part in the Siege of Ciudad Rodrigo. The fortress of Ciudad Rodrigo was one of the two important French held fortresses (the other being Badajoz) and the siege of Ciudad Rodrigo began on 8 January. Despite their more privileged nature as an elite force in comparison to the normal infantry, the Guards still helped in the digging of trenches, an arduous duty made especially more by the absolutely terrible weather. When the assault on Ciudad Rodrigo finally happened on 19 January 1812 it was bloody, with fierce and chaotic hand-to-hand fighting taking place at the two breaches made in the walls of the fortress. The casualties were heavy for the British, with over 500 being killed, wounded or missing during the assault and over 1,000 casualties in total for the siege, though despite this, the British took Ciudad Rodrigo.

In July, the 1st Battalion took part in the Battle of Salamanca, a decisive victory for the British, and then subsequently took part in the Siege of Burgos which ended in October. In 1813, the 2nd Battalion took part in an expedition to the Low Countries, while back in Spain, the 1st Battalion took part in the Battle of Vittoria in which the British and Allied forces won a resounding victory over the French, as well as at the bloody Siege of San Sebastian, where the British besieged San Sebastián from July to August, after two bloody assaults by the British troops. After fighting so hard against the French in Portugal and Spain, in late 1813, the British finally pushed into France itself, where the 1st Battalion took part in a number of successful engagements, including at Nive. Napoleon would eventually abdicate in April 1814.

In March 1815, Napoleon returned to France from his exile in Elba, eventually retaking France from Louis XVIII. The 2nd Battalion, 3rd Foot Guards, who were stationed in what is present-day Belgium, took part in, on 18 June, one of the most famous battles in history, Waterloo. The battalion was part of the two battalion 2nd Guards Brigade, under the command of Major-General Sir John Byng, the other battalion being the 2nd Battalion of the Coldstream Regiment of Foot Guards. The 3rd Foot Guards were positioned on the ridge just behind Hougoumont Farm under the command of Second Major Francis Hepburn, while the light companies of the two battalions, under the command of Lieutenant-Colonel James Macdonnell, garrisoned the Farm, a place, on the right flank of the British and Allied army, that would be a key position during the battle.

Just after 11:00am, the battle commenced, with a French division, under the command of Prince Jérôme Bonaparte, beginning the assault on Hougoumont, with the Farm coming under heavy artillery fire. The French assaulted the farm, but the Guards' stout defense repulsed the first French attack. A second attack happened, and during that attack, the French attempted to push through the main gate. Despite the gallant efforts of the British Guardsmen to shut it, a few dozen French troops broke through before the Guardsmen managed to shut the main gate once more. What followed was a fierce hand-to-hand fight between the Guardsmen and French, until eventually all the French, minus a drummer boy who was spared by the Guardsmen, were killed.

The third attack came from the east of the farm, at the orchard. A few companies of the 3rd Guards subsequently confronted the French troops and, after some hard fighting, drove them from the orchard and back into the woods. The fourth attack soon came, this time with the use of a fearsome howitzer, and thus, the Grenadier Company of the 3rd Guards was sent into the woods to destroy the howitzer, but were faced with a superior French force and were forced out of the woods. The 3rd Guards were then sent to repulse the French from the orchard which they duly did, driving the French back into the woods once more.

Further attacks occurred on the farm, and the gallant defenders never wilted in the face of such French attacks, and held the farm against all odds; even when the farm was set ablaze by howitzer fire, the defenders still repulsed all French attacks. The elite Guards had proven their professionalism and valour once more in the field, and contributed greatly to the British and Allied victory at Waterloo, gaining the praise of the Duke of Wellington in the process. The defenders of Hougoumont suffered over 1,000 men killed or wounded during the Battle for Hougoumont, with the 3rd Guards suffering well over 200 men killed or wounded; while the French suffered many thousands of casualties in their numerous attempts to capture the farm. Napoleon was defeated and as before, he was exiled, this time to the British territory of St. Helena, where he would remain until his death in 1821.

The 2nd Battalion then joined the Army of Occupation in France where they would remain until 1816 when they returned home to the UK. In 1824, both battalions of the 3rd Foot Guards deployed to Dublin, Ireland, and in 1826, the 2nd Battalion deployed to Portugal until returning home in 1828. Also in 1826, the 1st Battalion deployed to Manchester during troubles there. In 1830, William IV ascended to the throne, and the following year gave the regiment a new name, the Scots Fusilier Guards.

== Crimean War ==
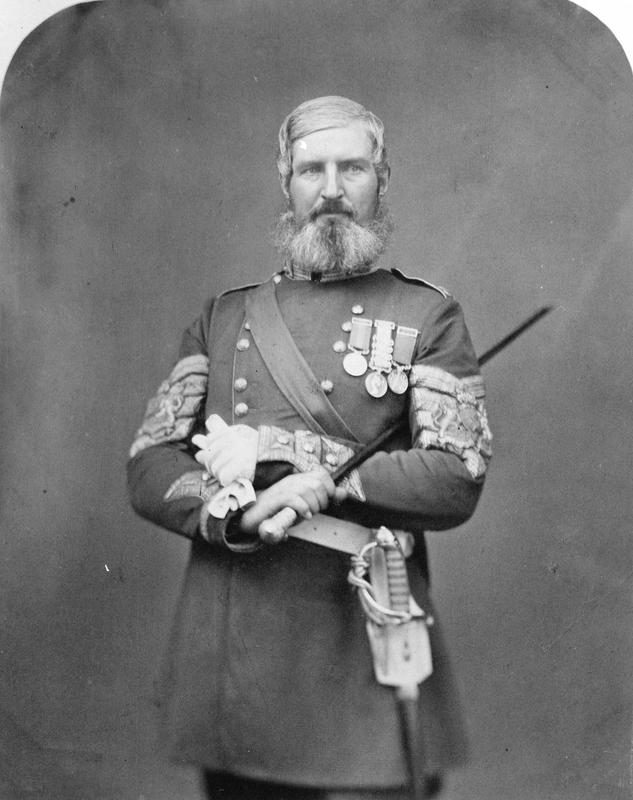
Sergeant Major Edwards of the Scots Fusilier Guards on his return from the Crimean War.

In 1854, the Crimean War began, which pitted the United Kingdom, France and the Ottoman Empire against the Russian Empire. The 1st Battalion of the Scots Fusilier Guards were dispatched as part of the Guards Brigade to the East, being deployed to Malta, Bulgaria and Turkey, before, in September, the British finally landed in the Crimea, at a place called Calamity Bay. The British and their French allies then began the advance on Sevastopol, a Russian naval base, but was blocked at the River Alma by Russian forces. And here came the Battalion's first engagement at the Battle of Alma, an action that saw chaotic and heavy hand-to-hand combat between the British and Russians. The road to Sevastopol runs through a gap between two hills, one to the east, known as Kourgane Hill and the other to the west, known as Telegraph Hill. On Kourgane Hill there consisted two earthworks, one known as the 'Great Redoubt' on the western side of the hill, while the other was on the eastern side, known as the 'Lesser Redoubt'.

A British unit, known as the Light Division, made its advance, making steady progress on the Great Redoubt, and took it with very heavy casualties; however chaos soon set in, after a confusing order from an unknown officer during a Russian counter-attack was soon contradicted by other officers, and the British duly fell back. The Scots Fusilier Guards, in the center of the Guards Brigade, part of the 1st Division, were supporting the Light Division, though had only just crossed the River Alma by the time the Great Redoubt was taken. One brave group of Royal Welch Fusiliers had held their ground and were firing into the Russians until confronted by a mass of Russian soldiers, forcing them to retreat rapidly, and in the process, smashed straight into the formation of the advancing Scots Fusiliers Guards, causing immense chaos. The Russians seized their opportunity to strike, launching a large-scale bayonet charge on the regiment, resulting in brutal carnage, eventually forcing the regiment to reluctantly withdraw, suffering over 150 casualties. During this chaos, the Colour party of the regiment, whose Colours had been shot through, held its ground against the overwhelming Russian force, and safeguarded the Colours from the Russians, as well as helping to rally the regiment. The Russians attempted to exploit the chaos when a large Russian force advanced on the Brigade of Guards, but the Guards poured a withering and accurate fire into the Russians, causing very heavy casualties. The British, including men of the battered Scots Fusilier Guards, subsequently advancing, causing the Russians to flee which allowed the British to re-take the Great Redoubt. Further heroics occurred on the right, with the Highland Brigade, just two lines deep, firing, while advancing, on the Russians who soon fled from the spirited Highland Brigade. The Battle had been bloody, with the British losing more than 2,000 casualties while the Russians suffered 6,000. For their actions at Alma, the Scots Fusilier Guards won a battle honour and four men of the regiment would later win the Victoria Cross, an award created in 1856 to become the highest award for valour in the face of the enemy. These men were Captain Robert James Lindsay, Sergeants John Knox and James McKechnie, as well as Private William Reynolds.

In 1855, the regiment took part in another bloody engagement, at the Battle of Inkerman, at a place known to the British as Mount Inkerman. The British, and their French allies, were attacked by numerically superior Russian troops, hoping to break the Siege of Sevastopol. The attack happened in very thick mist and despite having weak defences and being outnumbered severely, the British defended stoutly against the Russians. The first Russian attacks was completely devastated by the accurate fire of the badly outnumbered British defenders. The Guards helped defend the right of the British defenders, and at Sandbag Battery, performed valiantly in the face of overwhelming Russian numbers, and despite the difficulties the Guards faced, they overcame them and devastated the Russian forces assaulting the Sandbag Battery. The Battle of Inkerman was a victory that had been filled with dreadfully brutal hand-to-hand combat, that, at times, resembled the battles of a far more primitive age, and saw over 2,000 British soldiers killed or wounded out of over 8,000 that took part in the battle, with the Russians suffering over 11,000 casualties. The regiment won its thirteenth battle honour for its part at Inkerman.

The Scots Fusilier Guards also took part in the arduous Siege of Sevastopol, which lasted from September 1854 to September the following year, when it was captured by the British. The Crimean War would end in 1856 with the Treaty of Paris, with the Scots Fusilier Guards returning home to the UK that same year.

== Distant troubles ==
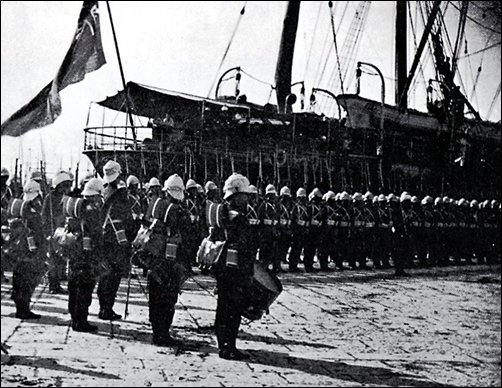
1st Battalion Scots Guards disembarking at Alexandria on 12 August 1882

Scots Guards drummer, piper, bugler and bandsman, about 1891

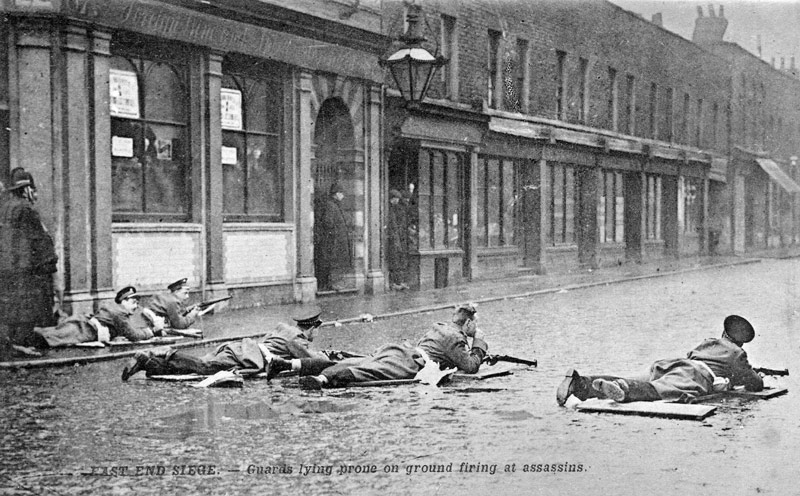
Soldiers from the Scots Guards open fire during Siege of Sidney Street 1911

In 1862, the 2nd Battalion landed in the then-colony of New Brunswick to reinforce the garrison there during increased tensions with the United States during the American Civil War. The battalion departed in 1864, while the American Civil War still raged, and returned home to the UK. In 1877 Queen Victoria, changed the regiment's name to the now more familiar Scots Guards. In 1881, the 1st Battalion deployed to Dublin, Ireland and the following year the battalion, as part of the Guard Brigade, took part in an expedition to Egypt, which came about in response to a revolt led by Urabi Pasha, an Egyptian military officer. A 25,000 strong British force, under the command of Sir Garnet Wolseley, landed in Egypt in August, and on 13 September, the decisive engagement of the campaign occurred, the Battle of Tel el-Kebir, which ended in victory for the British, and culminated with the taking of Cairo and the capture of Urabi Pasha. The Scots Guards gained the battle honours "Tel-el-Kebir" and "Egypt 1882" for taking part in the Egyptian Expedition, and it was the last time the regiment carried the Colours into war.

In 1885, the 2nd Battalion took part in the Suakin Expedition to the Sudan, including the Battle of Hasheen, and gained the battle honour Suakin 1885 for their part in the campaign. The battalion returned home to the UK in late 1885 and took part in Queen Victoria's Golden Jubilee Military Review in 1887. In 1887, a proposal to convert the 1st Battalion Queen's Own Cameron Highlanders into the 3rd Battalion of the Scots Guards was dropped after concerted lobbying by the Camerons. In 1895, the 2nd Battalion of the regiment deployed to Dublin and returned to its barracks in London in 1897, with the 1st Battalion deploying to Dublin that same year.

In 1899, war broke out between the British Empire and the Dutch Boer Republics, the Transvaal and the Orange Free State. The 1st Battalion soon departed Ireland for South Africa to join up with the 1st Guards Brigade, and reached that country in November. The battalion quickly saw its first engagements in November, at Belmont, which ended in a British victory, and at the Battle of Modder River, another British victory, though it had come at a heavy cost in British life after the British forces had come under a terrible withering fire from the Boer defenders, but the Boers eventually withdrew; the Scots Guards gained a battle honour for their part in the battle. In December, the battalion took part in its first major engagement of the war at the Battle of Magersfontein. The Boers, well defended in their positions, poured a terrible fire into the attacking British, causing very heavy casualties, with the battle ending in a defeat for the British who had battled bravely against the Boers, and ending the attempts to relieve the town of Kimberley which was besieged by Boer forces; the siege would not to be lifted until February 1900. Also in 1899, the 3rd Battalion of the regiment was raised in London, though would not see overseas service in South Africa.

In 1900, the 2nd Battalion departed the UK for South Africa, landing there in April, whereupon it joined the 16th Infantry Brigade. The Scots Guards then saw action at another major battle, at the Battle of Paardeberg, which lasted for a number of days in February, though the Boers there were eventually defeated when the Boer leader Piet Cronje surrendered. The following month, the regiment took part in the Battle of Driefontein and in May, the 2nd Battalion took part in a small engagement at Biddulphsberg and on 31 May, the regiment was present at the capture of Johannesburg. During its time in Africa, the regiment performed a variety of duties, including manning blockhouses, rather than just its involvement in the many battles of the war. In June 1902, the British and their Commonwealth Allies triumphed over the Boers, after suffering dreadful casualties, appalling conditions and the terrible fighting they took part in against their tough adversary, the Boers. Following the end of the war the battalion returned home, leaving Cape Town in Winifredian and Michigan in September 1902, arriving at Southampton early the following month. They had proved their professionalism once more to the world, and returned to the usual public duties that accompany the Guards.

Elsewhere, in 1901, the regiment gained its first Colonel-in-Chief, Edward VII, with the other Guards regiments also gaining the King as their Colonel-in-Chief. In 1906 the 3rd Battalion of the regiment was disbanded due to changes in the British Army. In 1910, Edward VII died and both battalions of the Scots Guards performed a variety of duties during the sad time, including lining the route of the procession. That same year the regiment gained its second Colonel-in-Chief, the newly crowned George V. In 1911, small detachments of the Scots Guards were involved in a decidedly unpleasant event, the Siege of Sidney Street. In 1910 a group of Latvian anarchists had attempted to rob a jewellers shop in Houndsditch in December 1910, and it had ended in the murder of three policemen and two being seriously wounded. A number of the gang were soon captured and on 1 January 1911, an informant had told the police that a small number of the gang were residing in 100 Sidney Street. On 3 January, after some fighting, the street was cordoned off to prevent the gang from escaping and, as the police were inadequately armed to fight the gang who had superior weapons, small detachments of the 1st Battalion, Scots Guards were called to the scene. Continuous gunfire raged between the police and Guardsmen and the small gang for the duration of the siege. Eventually, a fire began and soon afterwards two badly burnt members of the anarchist gang were discovered; one had been shot. Later that year, the regiment departed the UK for Egypt and returned home in 1913.
