= National Cycle Route 544 =

Cycle route in the United Kingdom

The National Cycle Route 544 is a Sustrans regional route in the North Wessex Downs of southern Oxfordshire, linking Wantage and Didcot. The route is 12 miles (19 km) long, and overlaps with part of the ancient Icknield Way and frequently links to The Ridgeway National Trail.

== Route ==
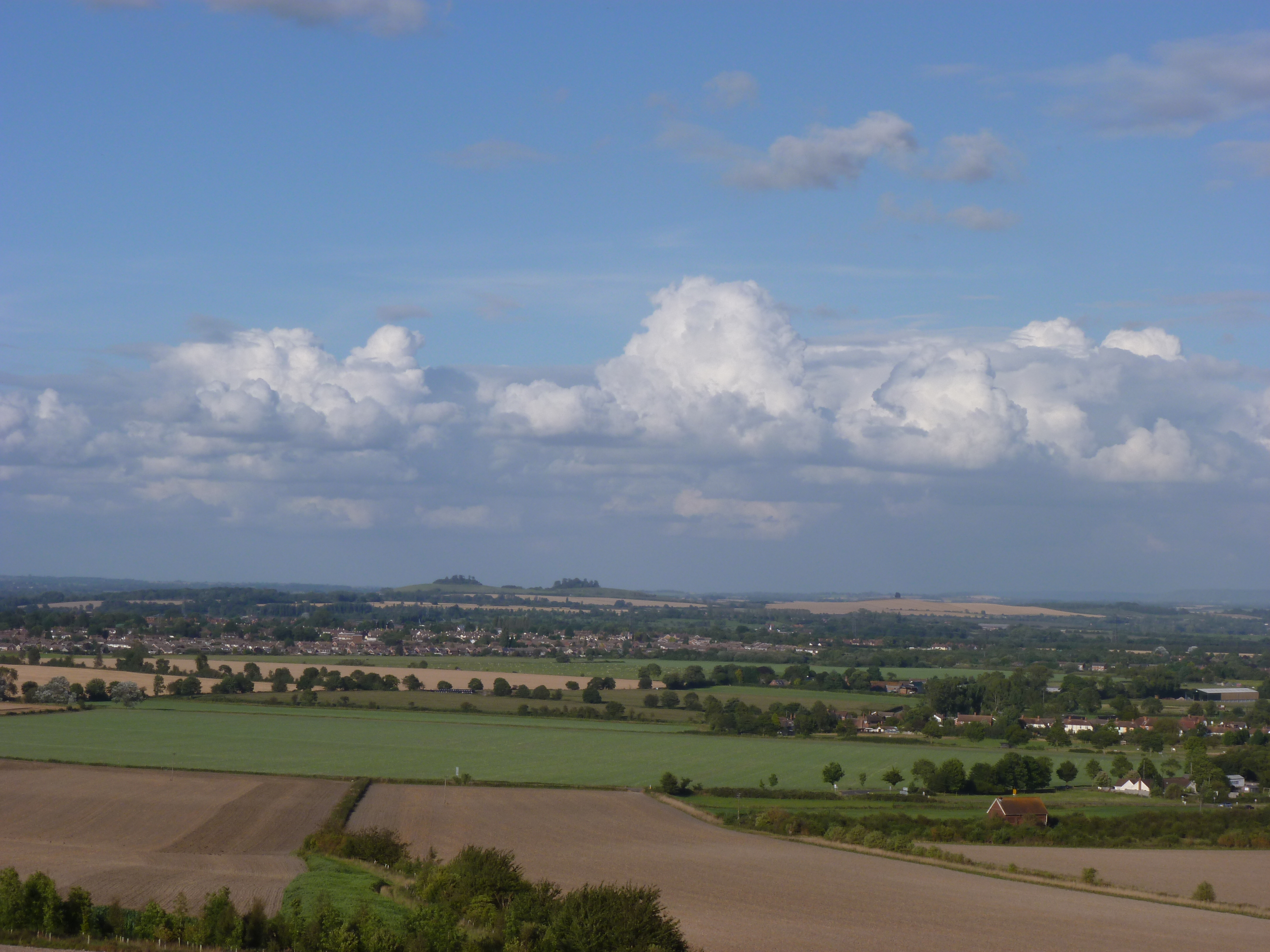
View of Wittenham Clumps from national cycle route 544

The starts in the east of Didcot and passes between East and West Hagbourne as a traffic-free bridle-way and track, partly using a disused railway embankment. The path continues through Upton, merging with the Icknield Way as it continues west, behind Harwell and East Hendred, through the Harwell Science and Innovation Campus. The route then follows a quiet country lane through the Lockinge Estate, including East and West Ginge, and East and West Lockinge. The route finishes in Wantage near Letcombe Brook.

The route is frequently used by commuters between Wantage, Didcot and the Harwell research centre. There is an art trail between Didcot and Upton.

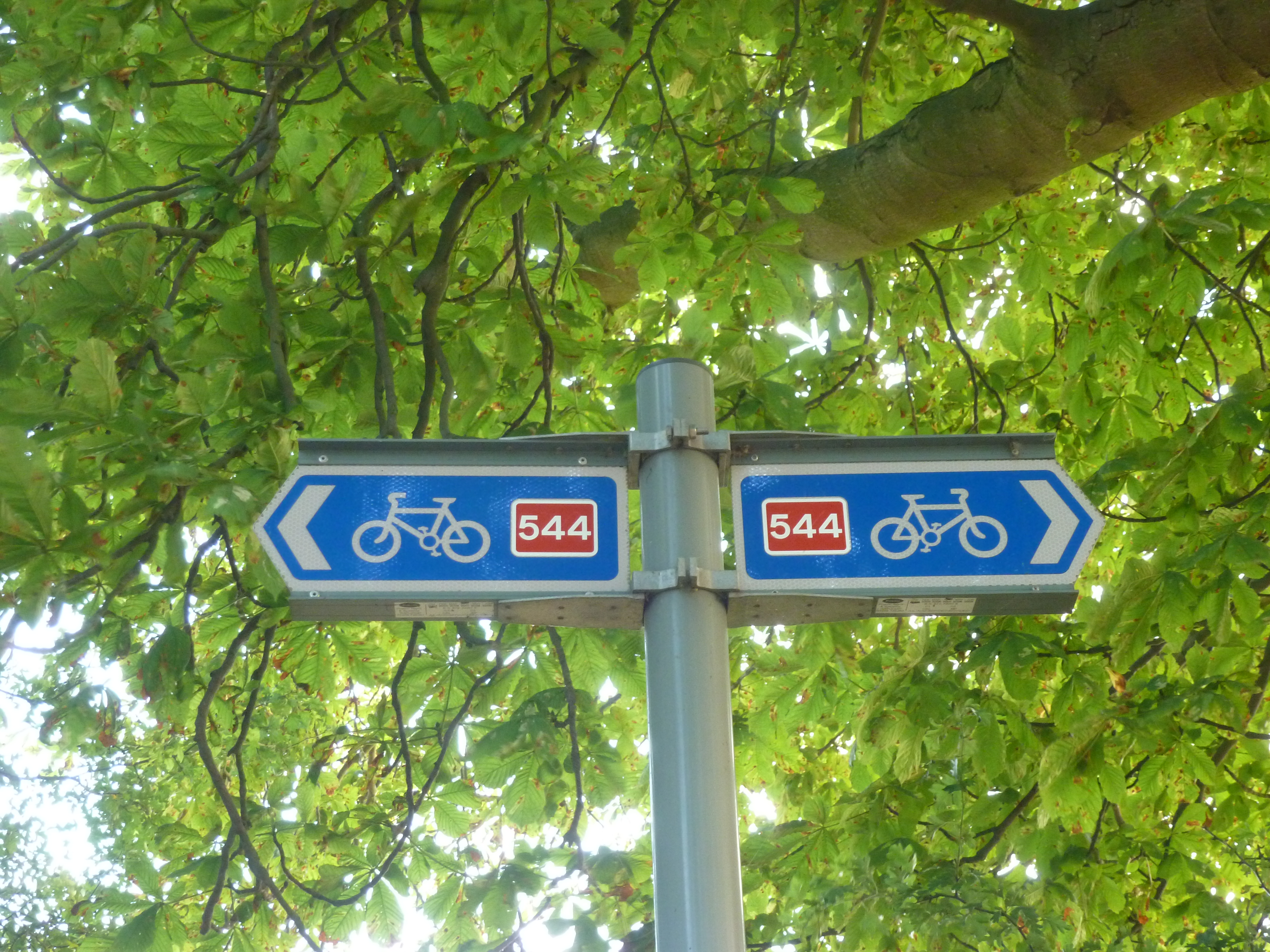
Cycle Route 544 signage near West Lockinge

== Changes ==
In 2020, Chilton Road was closed to motorised traffic. In 2022, the change was made permanent. The change created a traffic-free stretch west of Upton.
