= Lockinge Estate =

Coordinates: 51.59°N 1.38°W

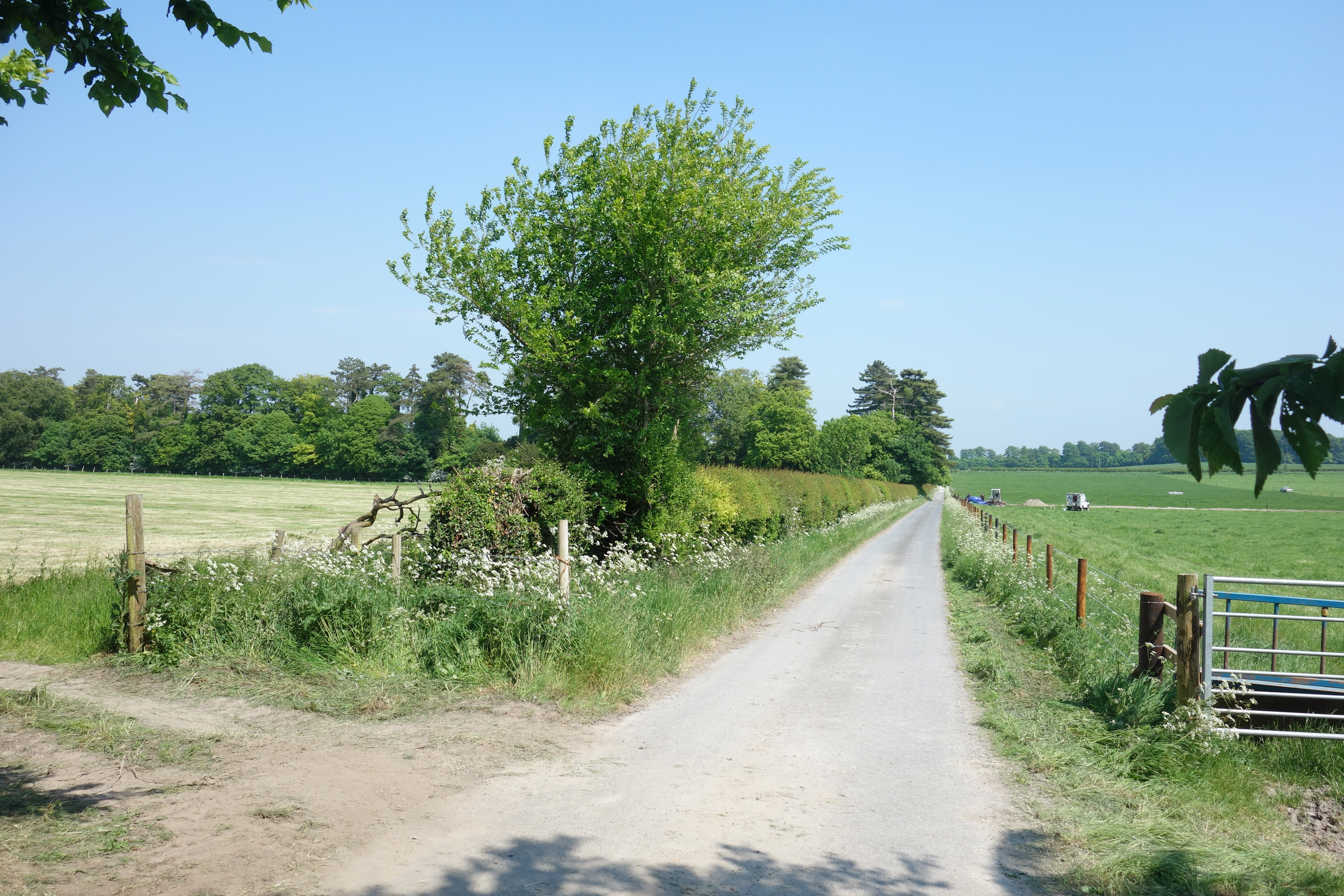
A road near Bitham Farm, on the Lockinge Estate

The Lockinge Estate is a 3,035-hectare (7,500-acre) agricultural and housing estate near Wantage that today includes most of the land and property encompassing the villages of West Lockinge, East Lockinge and Ardington. The current manager of the Lockinge Estate is Thomas Loyd. Almost the entire estate is included within the North Wessex Downs Area of Outstanding Natural Beauty (AONB).

The ancient Icknield Way passed through the estate, as does the modern-day National Cycle Route 544.

== History ==
Following consecutive land purchases between 1859 and 1870, the estate became one of the largest in England. The estate grew in character under the ownership of Lady Harriet and Robert Loyd-Lindsay, 1st Baron Wantage, who significantly improved housing and services for the estate workers and attempted to create a worker's model village. Lord Wantage also had Lockinge House extended and renovated, complete with a large ice house and orangery.

The estate was modernised under Christopher Loyd following World War Two, who had Lockinge House demolished in 1947, established the Lockinge Stud, and established the Lockinge Trust to provide affordable housing. The Lockinge Trust and the Village Housing Charitable Trust continue to manage housing and historic issues on the estate.
