= Lockinge =

Civil parish in Oxfordshire, England

Coordinates: 51.586°N 1.388°W

- Civil parish
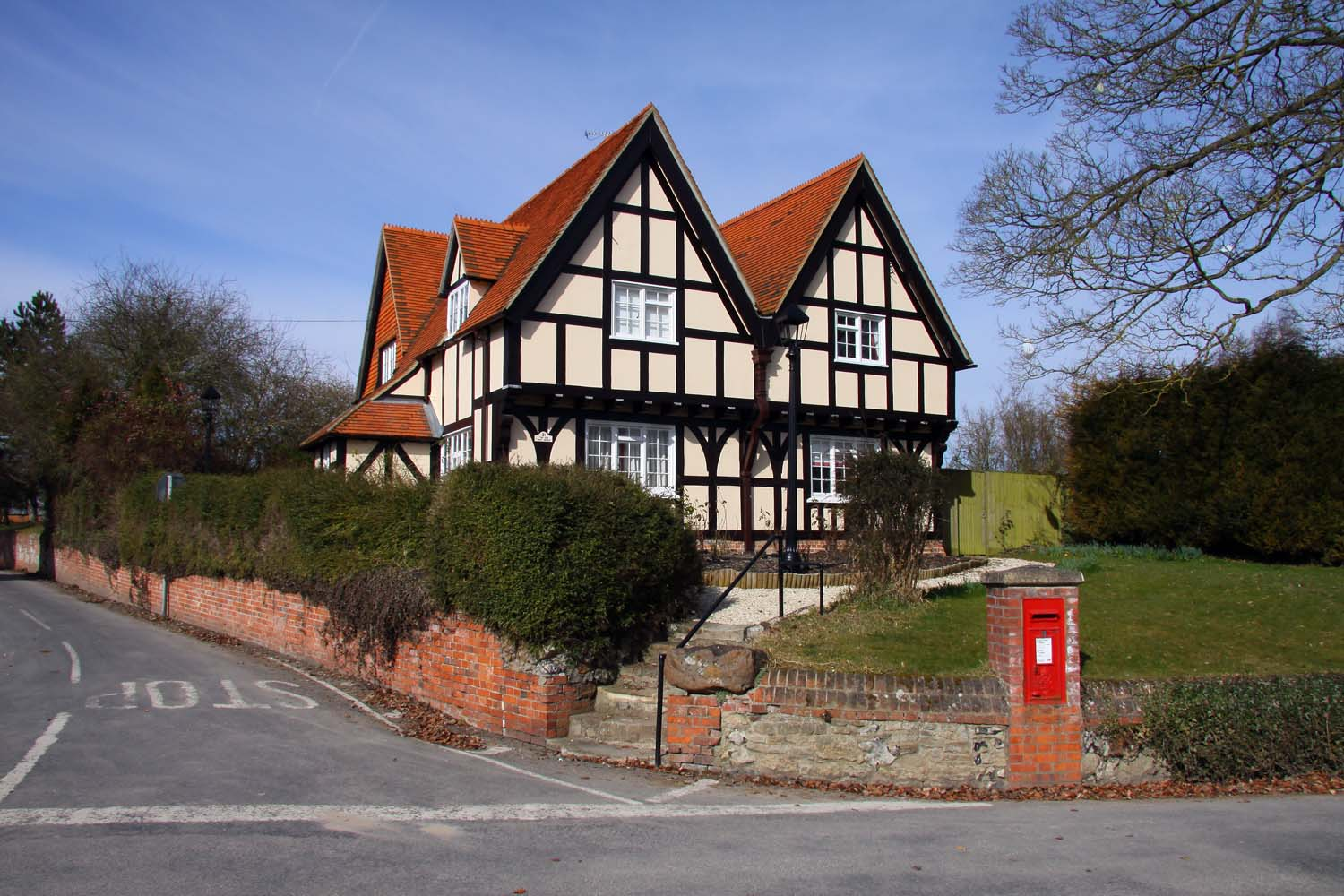
- The Old Post Office, East Lockinge

- Location within Oxfordshire
- Population: 192 (Parish, 2021)
- Civil parish: Lockinge
- District: Vale of White Horse
- Shire county: Oxfordshire
- Region: South East
- Country: England
- Sovereign state: United Kingdom
- Post town: Wantage
- Postcode district: OX

Lockinge is a civil parish in the Vale of White Horse district of Oxfordshire, England. The parish comprises the village of East Lockinge and the adjoining hamlet of West Lockinge as well as surrounding rural areas. It lies 1 mile (1.6 km) east of Wantage. At the 2021 census the parish had a population of 192. Since 2000, Lockinge has shared a grouped parish council with the neighbouring parish of Ardington.

== History ==
East Lockinge was an ancient parish in the Wantage hundred of Berkshire. The hamlet of West Lockinge closely adjoins East Lockinge village, but historically lay just over the parish boundary in the neighbouring parish of Wantage.

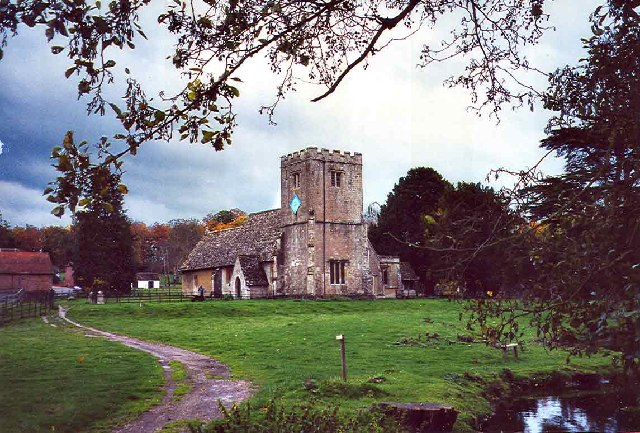
All Saints' Church, East Lockinge

Parish functions under the poor laws from the 17th century onwards were administered separately for the township of West Lockinge and other parts of Wantage parish. As such, West Lockinge became a separate civil parish in 1866, when the legal definition of 'parish' was changed to be the areas used for administering the poor laws. East Lockinge and West Lockinge were merged into a new civil parish called Lockinge in 1934.

As well as East Lockinge and West Lockinge, the parish also includes the site of Betterton, a deserted medieval village.

Lockinge was transferred from Berkshire to Oxfordshire in 1974 under the Local Government Act 1972.

== Governance ==
There are three tiers of local government covering Lockinge, at parish, district and county level: Ardington and Lockinge Parish Council, Vale of White Horse District Council, and Oxfordshire County Council. The parish council is a grouped parish council, set up in 2000 to cover the two parishes of Lockinge and Ardington. The parish council generally meets at the Loyd-Lindsay Rooms in Ardington.
