= Overstone, Northamptonshire =

Village in Northamptonshire, England

Coordinates: 52.2907°N 0.8212°W

Overstone
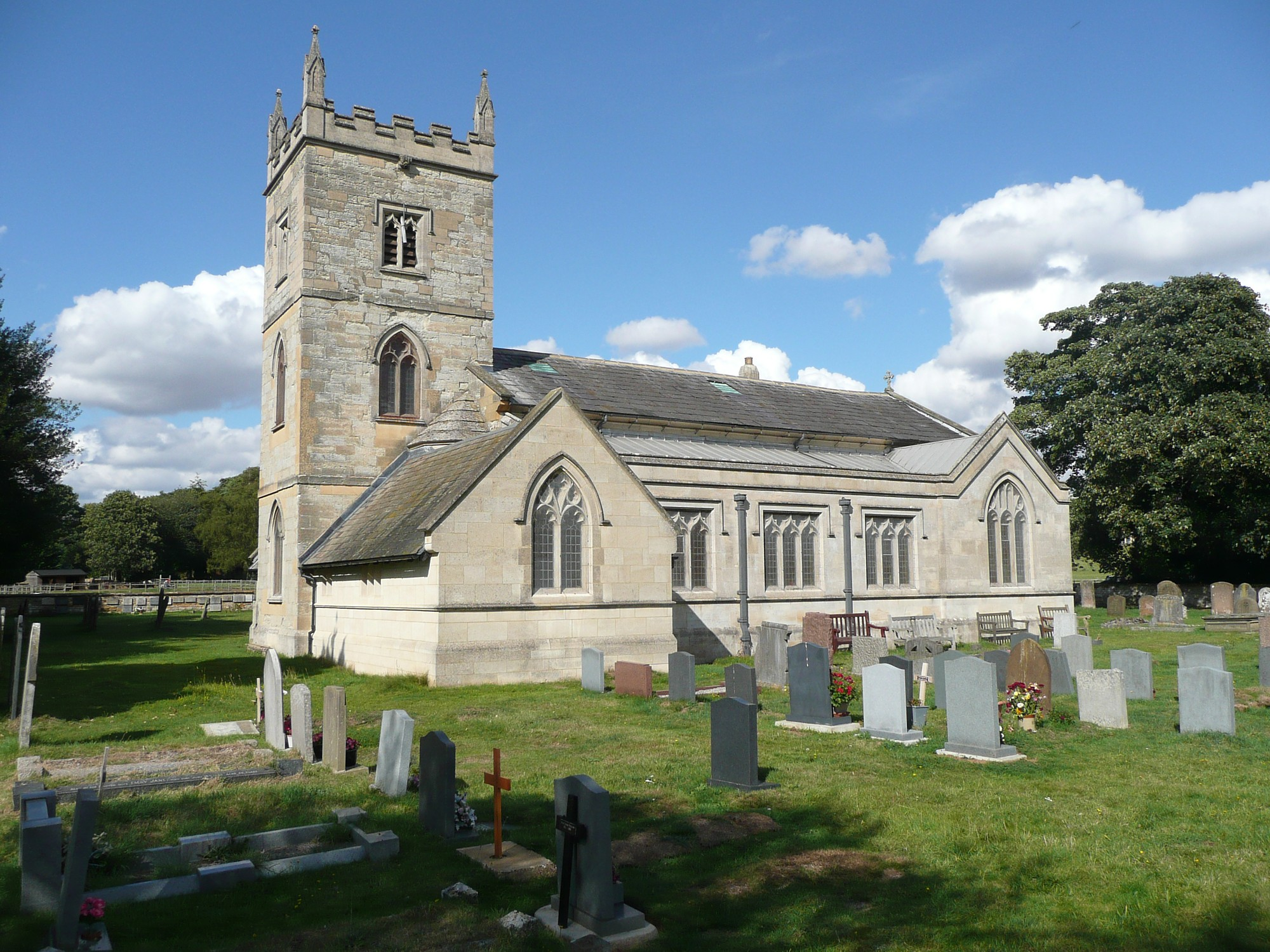
- St Nicholas' Church

- Location within Northamptonshire
- Population: 741 (2011)
- OS grid reference: SP8066
- Unitary authority: West Northamptonshire
- Ceremonial county: Northamptonshire
- Region: East Midlands
- Country: England
- Sovereign state: United Kingdom
- Post town: Northampton
- Postcode district: NN6
- Dialling code: 01604
- Police: Northamptonshire
- Fire: Northamptonshire
- Ambulance: East Midlands
- UK Parliament: Daventry

Overstone is a village and civil parish in West Northamptonshire, England. At the time of the 2001 census, the parish's population was 650 people, increasing to 741 at the 2011 Census.

The villages name means 'Ufic's/Ofe's farm/settlement'.

== The Church of St Nicholas Overstone ==
This church is now a chapel of ease in the parish of Sywell with Overstone.

Overstone, about four miles from Northampton and just off the A43 road to Kettering is a long linear village with the church of St Nicholas, built in 1807 and remodelled in 1903, standing in a field in Overstone Park a short walk from the village. The church constructed of Kingsthorpe Stone (grey sandstone with streaks of silty clay) was built by John Kipling and replaced the old dilapidated earlier one built at the beginning of the 13th century and situated further into the park in the deserted village of Overstone. During the medieval period of the 12th, 13th and 14th centuries Overstone village was a little further into the park beyond the current church. It was a village of 'modest size' and continued throughout the following centuries to be a small village owned by the resident Lord of the Manor. In 1672 the manor is described as having 14 farms and 15 cottages. It is likely that Henry Stratford, Lord of the Manor of Overstone moved the village into its current position sometime around the middle of the 18th century – Eyre's map of 1775 shows the village having moved with only the church and rectory standing in front of the manor house. There are no traces of this first church which during the fifteenth century had four altars dedicated to the saints, Mary, Anne, Thomas and John the Baptist, whilst the manor house has had a variety of owners and a horrible fire in the late 20th century. The north wall of St Nicholas' holds the 'Wantage Window'. Lady Wantage once owned the manor and gave the window in memory of her husband who fought in the Crimean War, winning one of the first VC crosses to be awarded. He is also remembered as being one of the founders of the British Red Cross. There are also several monuments from the old church.

The church has been reordered and the pews were removed it is now used for a lunch club, children's and family worship.

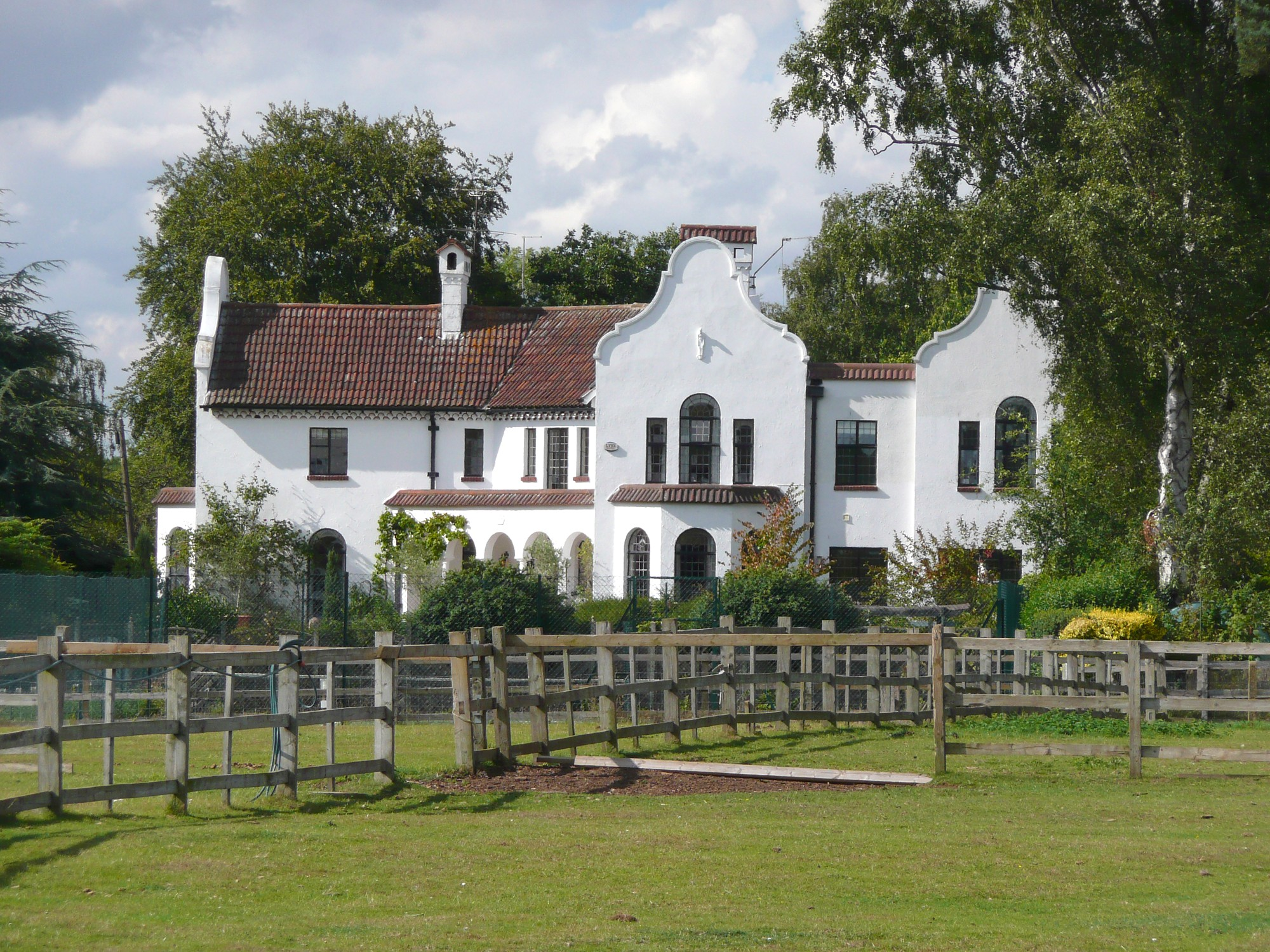
Cape Dutch-style architecture on Sywell Road

== See also ==
- Overstone Anglo-Saxon cemetery
- Overstone Hall
- Overstone Park School
