= West Lockinge =

Hamlet in Oxfordshire, England

Coordinates: 51.587°N 1.392°W

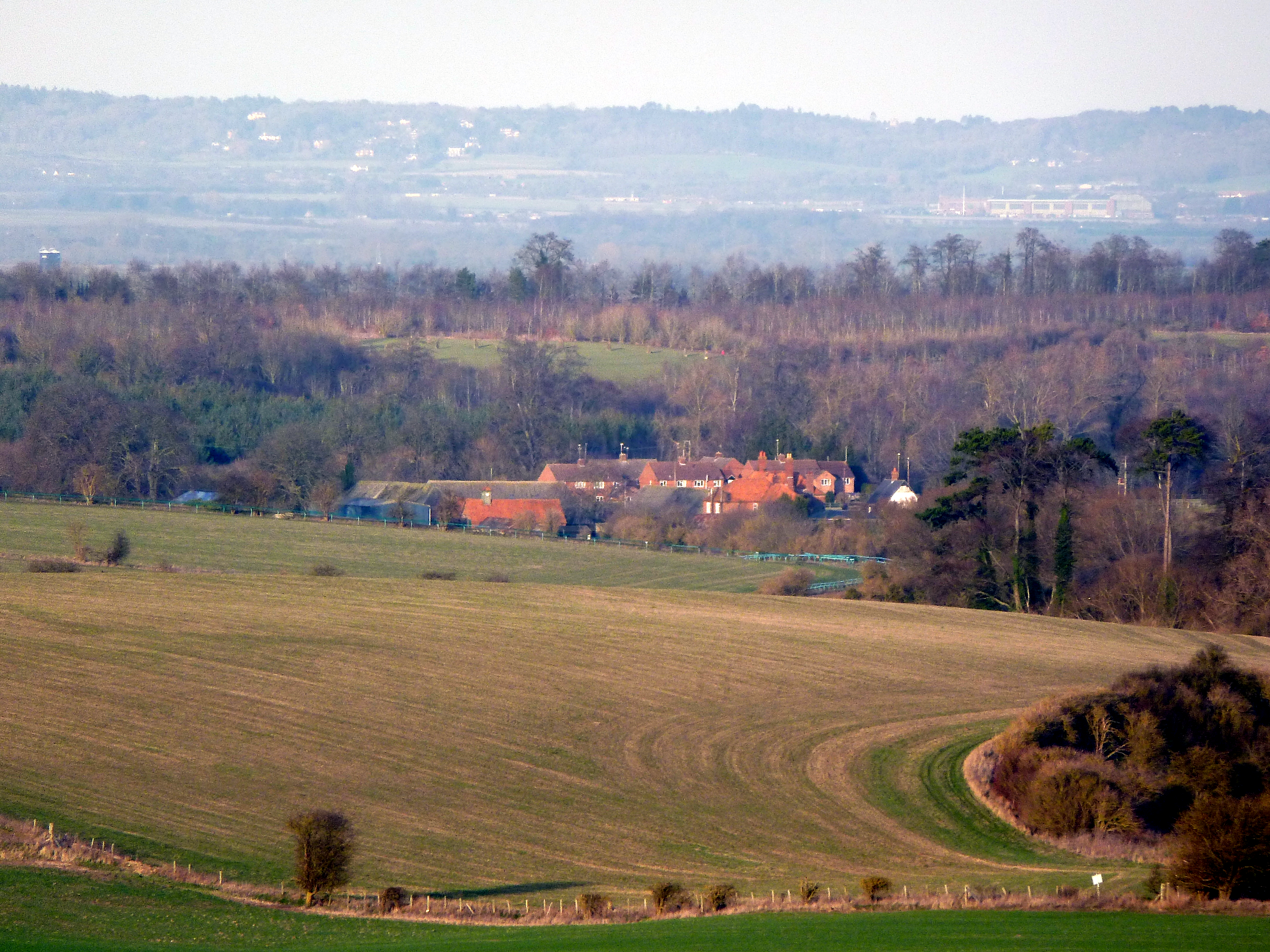
- West Lockinge from The Ridgeway

- Location within Oxfordshire
- OS grid reference: SU4287
- Civil parish: Lockinge
- District: Vale of White Horse
- Shire county: Oxfordshire
- Region: South East
- Country: England
- Sovereign state: United Kingdom
- Post town: Wantage
- Postcode district: OX12
- Dialling code: 01235
- Police: Thames Valley
- Fire: Oxfordshire
- Ambulance: South Central
- UK Parliament: Didcot and Wantage
- Website: Ardington and Lockinge Parish Council

West Lockinge is a hamlet in the civil parish of Lockinge, in the Vale of White Horse district, in the county of Oxfordshire, England. It was part of Berkshire until the 1974 local authority boundary changes transferred the Vale of White Horse to Oxfordshire. The village is about 1.5 miles (2.4 km) east of Wantage and is included within the North Wessex Downs Area of Outstanding Natural Beauty (AONB).

== Geography ==
A chalk stream Goddard's Brook emerges in the village, feeding into Ginge Brook, which eventually joins the River Ock near Abingdon. In 1993 a mixed conifer and deciduous woodland was planted behind the village, the area is named Christopher's Wood after Christopher Loyd, previous manager of the Lockinge Estate. National Cycle Route 544 passes through the village.

== History ==
The route of the ancient Icknield Way passes through the village. Arnhill and the nearby vicinity behind the village was an Iron Age fortification and Anglo-Saxon burial ground. Although a barrow was destroyed by ploughing, in approximately 1863 remains and artefacts were recovered from the summit of the hill. West Lockinge had a tithe barn for several centuries but no trace of it now survives. An open field system of farming also prevailed in West Lockinge parish until it was enclosed in 1808. One cottage in the village is half-timbered and bears the date 1666.

West Lockinge Farm has a Georgian farmhouse of five bays. It is built of blue and red brick and has a hipped roof. A record from 1770 of a "new erected messuage" at West Lockinge may refer to this house, which has been enlarged by later alterations. The farm is now run by Henrietta Knight and formerly Terry Biddlecombe, trainers of the racing horse Best Mate. Since 1958 there has been a Lockinge Stakes horse race at Newbury Racecourse.

The hamlet of West Lockinge closely adjoins the neighbouring village of East Lockinge, which was an ancient parish, but West Lockinge lay just over the parish boundary in the neighbouring parish of Wantage. Parish functions under the poor laws from the 17th century onwards were administered separately for the township of West Lockinge and other parts of Wantage parish. As such, West Lockinge became a separate civil parish in 1866, when the legal definition of 'parish' was changed to be the areas used for administering the poor laws. East Lockinge and West Lockinge were merged into a new civil parish called Lockinge in 1934. At the 1931 census (the last before the abolition of the parish), West Lockinge had a population of 60.

== Sources ==
- Page, W.H.; Ditchfield, P.H., eds. (1924). A History of the County of Berkshire, Volume 4. Victoria County History. pp. 307–311.
- Pevsner, Nikolaus (1966). Berkshire. The Buildings of England. Harmondsworth: Penguin Books. pp. 169–170.
