= Wantage Hall =

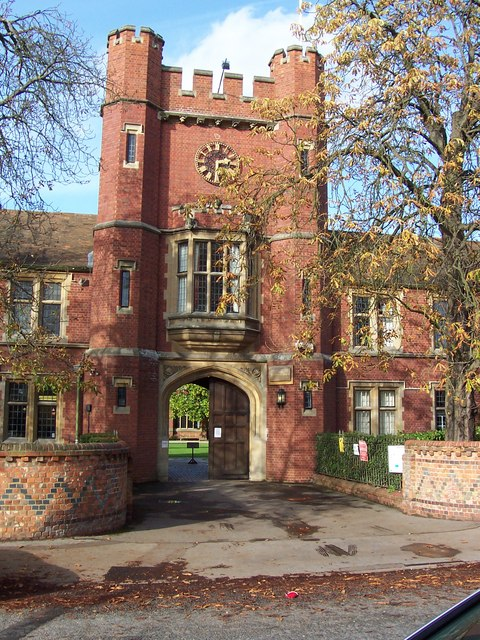
- Clock tower with arched entrance

- Location within Reading, Berkshire

General information
- Status: Grade II listed
- Type: Hall of residence
- Architectural style: Neo-Tudor
- Location: Upper Redlands Road, Reading, Berks RG1 5JG, Reading, Berkshire, England
- Coordinates: 51.4449°N 0.9556°W
- Construction started: 1906
- Completed: 1908
- Owner: University of Reading

Technical details
- Structural system: red brick, English bond

Design and construction
- Architect: Charles Steward Smith

Website
- www.rdg.ac.uk/wantage

Wantage Hall, built 1908, is the oldest hall of residence at the University of Reading, in Reading, England. The hall is one of 13 belonging to the university and is close to Whiteknights Campus. It is designated a grade II listed building, a status given for its special architectural or historic interest.

The hall provides fully catered residential accommodation for about 245 students.

== History ==
Wantage Hall was built in 1906–1908 by Harriet, Lady Wantage in memory of her husband Robert Loyd-Lindsay, 1st Baron Wantage, and was the first residential hall of the university, at that time an extension college of Christ Church, Oxford. The architect was Charles Steward Smith, and the hall was laid out as a quadrangle and built in Neo-Tudor style in red brick with stone details.

Wantage Hall was used by the No 1 School of Military Aeronautics during the First World War for training flight instructors, cadet pilots and observers. During World War II, it was the headquarters of RAF Reserve Command.

In 1970 an extension of little architectural interest was built to the north, also in red brick. This was called "New Court", and the original structure became "Old Court".

Wantage Hall is unique among the University of Reading halls in that fact that it is the only one with its own bar.

== Gallery ==
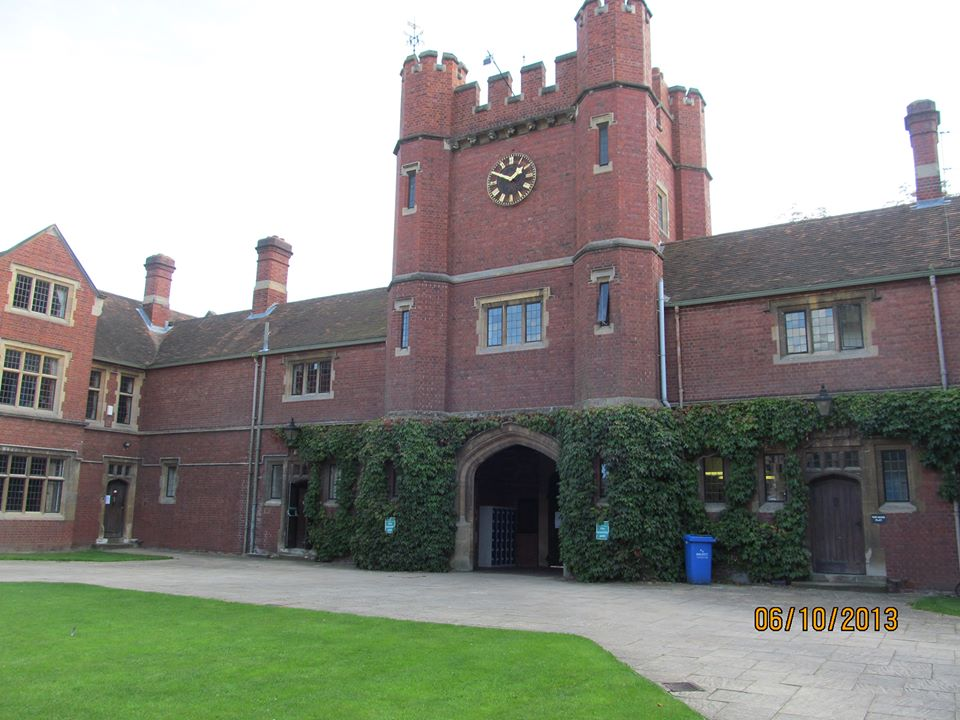
The clock tower and entrance from inside Old Court

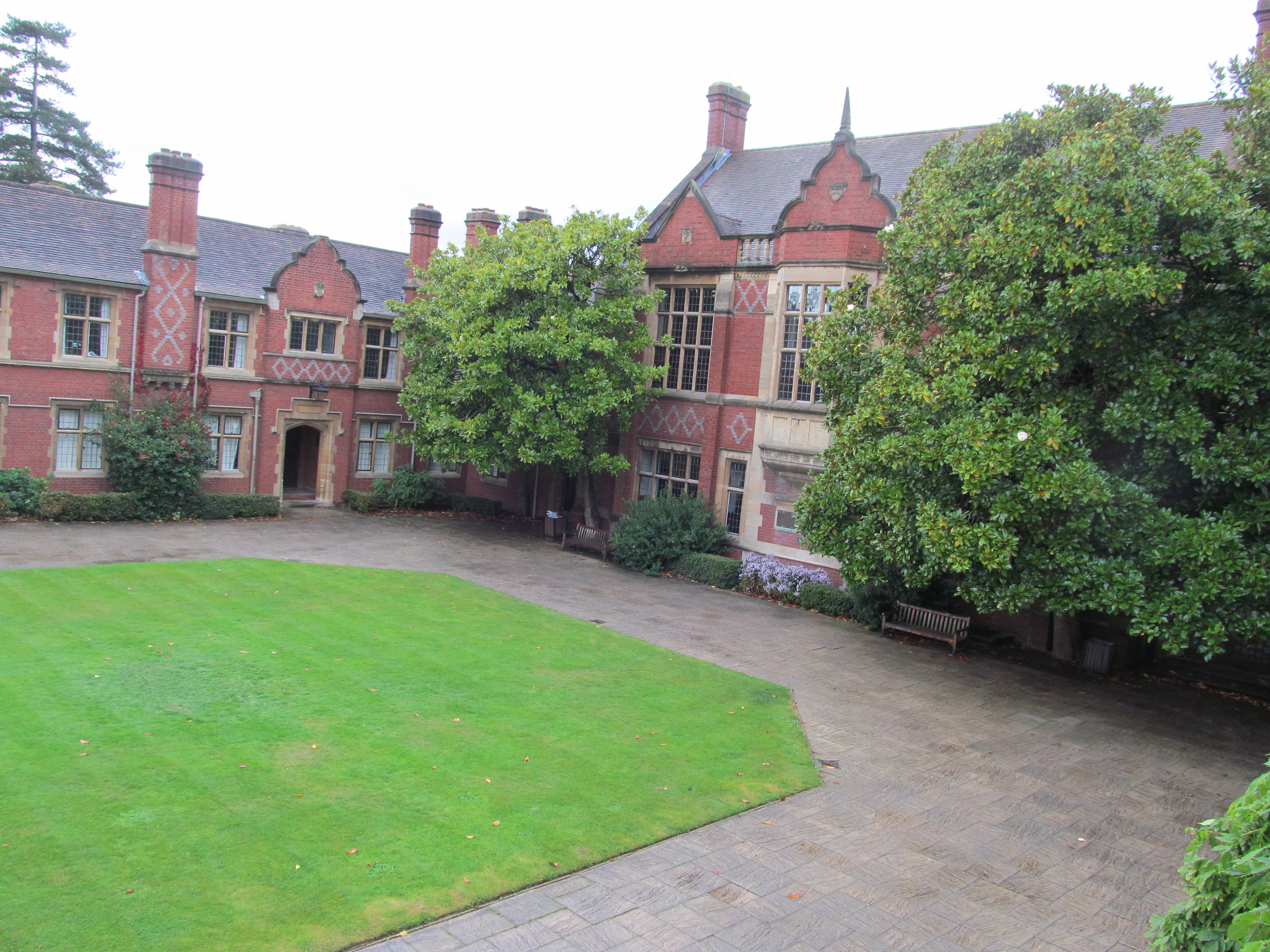
A view of Old Court

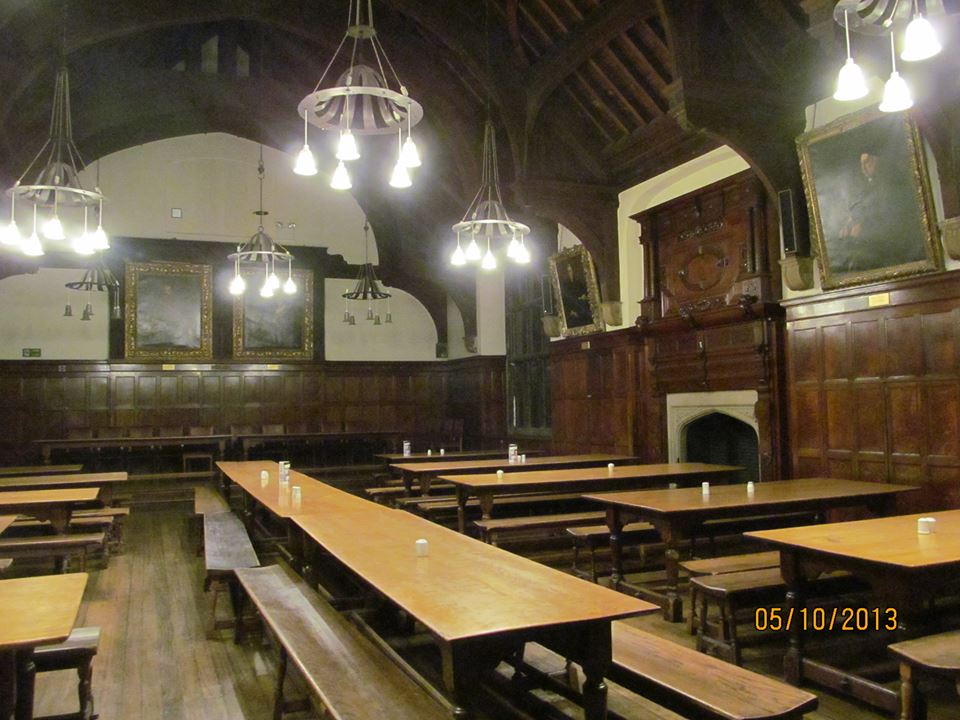
The dining room

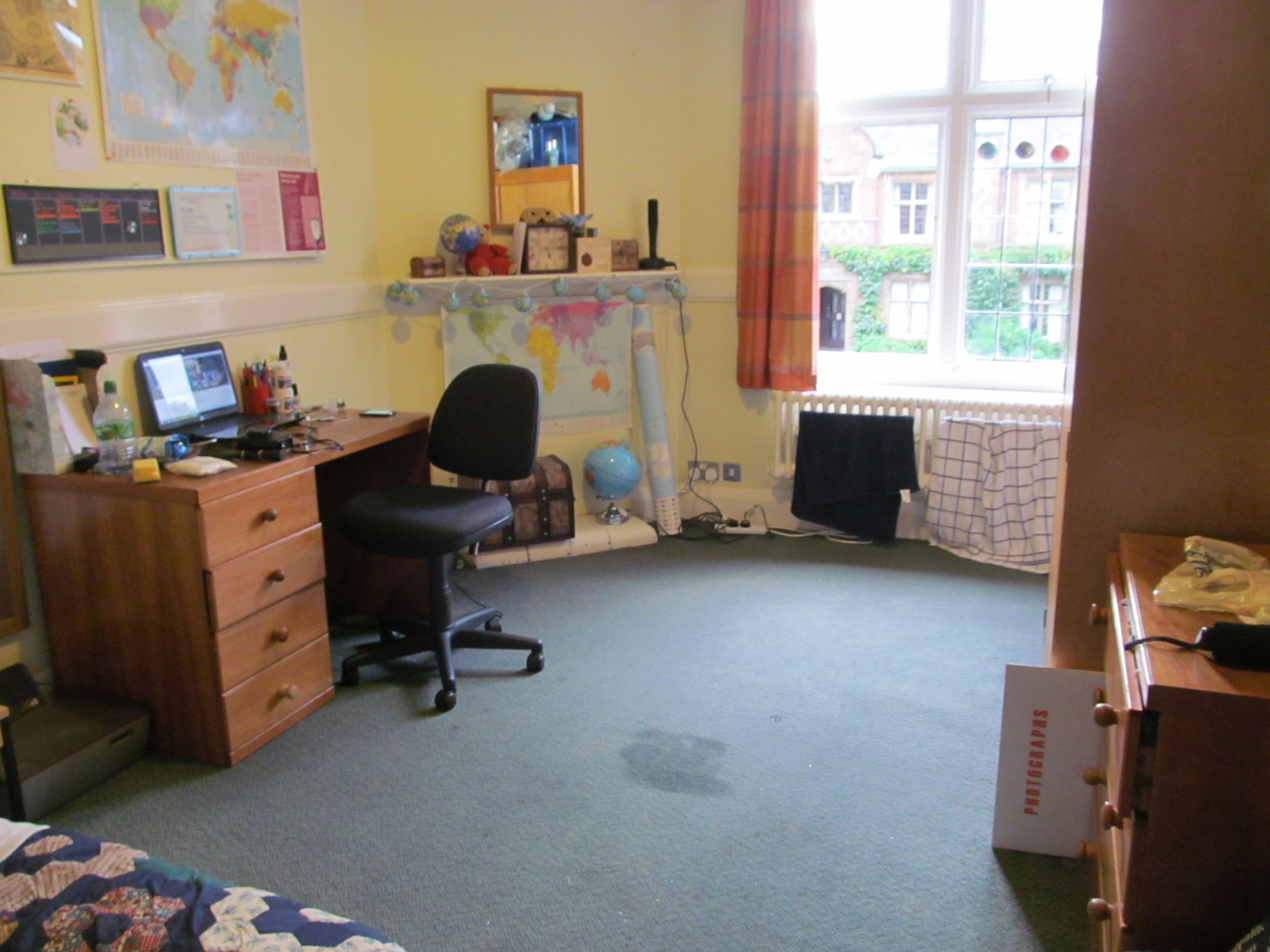
An Old Court bed room

== Notable alumni ==
- Julian Barratt, Comedian and writer, famous for The Mighty Boosh.
- Michael Rosen, Broadcaster, author, poet, and former Children's Laureate.
- Robin Bextor, Award-winning film director, producer, and author.
- Adrian Butchart, Award-winning screenwriter and film producer
