= Robert Loyd-Lindsay, 1st Baron Wantage =

British soldier, politician and philanthropist

Brigadier-General The Lord Wantage VC KCB VD
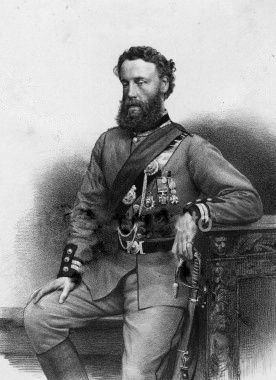
- Robert Loyd-Lindsay, c. 1882
- Born: 17 April 1832; Berkeley Street, Marylebone
- Died: 10 June 1901 (aged 69); Wantage, Berkshire
- Burial place: Ardington Church (Vault)
- Spouse(s): Harriet Jones-Loyd (m. 1858)
- Military career
- Allegiance: United Kingdom
- Branch: British Army
- Rank: Brigadier-General
- Units: 1st Battalion, Scots (Fusilier) Guards; Honourable Artillery Company; Home Counties Brigade; 1st Volunteer Battalion, Princess Charlotte of Wales's (Royal Berkshire Regiment)
- Conflicts: Crimean War: Battle of Alma; Battle of Balaklava; Battle of Inkerman; Siege of Sevastopol; Franco-Prussian War (Red Cross)
- Awards: Victoria Cross; Knight Commander of the Order of the Bath; Volunteer Officers' Decoration; Commander of the Legion of Honour (France); Knight of the Order of the Medjidie (Ottoman Empire); Order of the Crown, 3rd Class with Cross of Geneva (Prussia); Crimea Medal with 4 clasps Turkish Crimea Medal; Queen Victoria Diamond Jubilee Medal
- Other work: Member of Parliament for Berkshire; Financial Secretary to the War Office; Lord Lieutenant of Berkshire

Brigadier-General Robert James Loyd-Lindsay, 1st Baron Wantage, VC, KCB, VD (17 April 1832 – 10 June 1901) was a British soldier, politician and philanthropist. He was a benefactor to Wantage, and the first chairman and co-founder of the British National Society for Aid to the Sick and Wounded in War (later the British Red Cross Society), for which he obtained the important patronage of Queen Victoria.

== Background ==
Loyd-Lindsay was born in 1832, the second son of Lieutenant General Sir James Lindsay and Anne, daughter of Sir Coutts Trotter, 1st Baronet. His elder brother Coutts Lindsay succeeded his maternal grandfather as second Baronet in 1837 (see Lindsay Baronets). In 1858, he married The Honorable Harriet Sarah Jones-Loyd, the only surviving child and heiress of Samuel Jones-Loyd, 1st and last Baron Overstone, one of the richest men in the country, who endowed the couple with a considerable fortune and the Lockinge Estate near Wantage as a wedding present.

== Military service ==
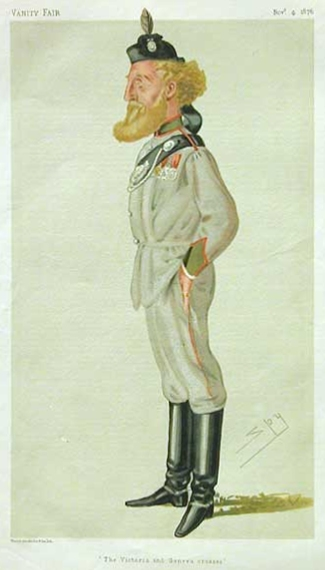
As portrayed in Vanity Fair (1876)

Lindsay fought as a captain in the Scots (Fusilier) Guards during the Crimean War. He was awarded the Victoria Cross for his actions on 20 September 1854 at the Battle of the Alma and 5 November at the Battle of Inkerman. The London Gazette described his actions as follows:

When the formation of the line of the Regiment was disordered at Alma, Captain Lindsay stood firm with the Colours, and by his example and energy, greatly tended to restore order. At Inkerman, at a most trying moment, he, with a few men, charged a party of Russians, driving them back, and running one through the body himself. —London Gazette

Lindsay was personally presented with the Victoria Cross by Queen Victoria at the first VC investiture held at Hyde Park, London, on 26 June 1857.

On 9 November 1858 Lindsay was appointed as Equerry to HRH The Prince of Wales and served as such before resigning on 7 February 1859. The brief period as Equerry was due to his engagement and impending marriage to The Honorable Harriet Sarah Jones Loyd. The couple were then known as Loyd-Lindsay.

Loyd-Lindsay was later involved in the volunteer movement, serving as Colonel of the Royal Berkshire Volunteers, and subsequently Brigadier-General of the Home Counties Brigade. He was one of the first recipients of the Volunteer Officers' Decoration. He was also Lieutenant Colonel of the Honourable Artillery Company from 13 November 1866 to 17 August 1881.

== Political career ==
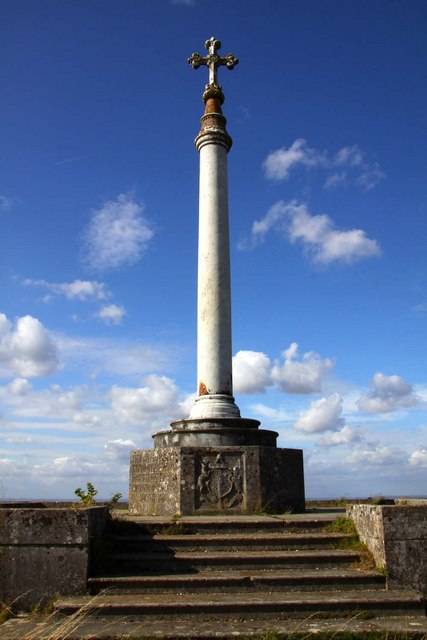
Memorial of Lord Wantage on The Ridgeway, Oxfordshire (looking north)

Loyd-Lindsay sat as Conservative Party Member of Parliament for Berkshire from 1865 until 1885 and served under Lord Beaconsfield as Financial Secretary to the War Office between 1877 and 1880.

He was appointed a Knight Commander of the Order of the Bath (KCB) in 1881. In 1885, he was elevated to the peerage as Baron Wantage, of Lockinge in the County of Berkshire. He then served as Lord Lieutenant of Berkshire from 1886 until his death. Having been initiated as a Freemason, passed and raised in Malta en route to the Crimea in 1854, he became Provincial Grand Master of Berkshire from 1898 until his death in 1901. He was appointed the first Chairman of the Council of the National Rifle Association on 25 November 1890.

== British Red Cross ==
On 15 July 1870, the Franco-Prussian War began. With the outbreak of the war serving as the immediate catalyst, John Furley met with Loyd-Lindsay to ask him if he would help set up a British Red Cross society in the United Kingdom. Furley had already been in touch with the International Committee of the Red Cross in Geneva over the desirability of founding a British national Red Cross society, and he knew that Lindsay also supported the goals of the new Red Cross movement. A letter from Loyd-Lindsay was published in The Times on 22 July calling for a national society in the United Kingdom, and pledging £1000 of his own money to the new initiative. On 4 August, he chaired a public meeting at Willis's Rooms in London which resolved that "a National Society be formed in this country for aiding sick and wounded soldiers in time of war, and that the said Society be formed upon the Rules laid down by the Geneva Conventions". Loyd-Lindsay continued to serve as chairman of the newly founded National Society for Aid to the Sick and Wounded in War (renamed the British Red Cross in 1905) until his death.

== Benefactions to Wantage ==
Loyd-Lindsay became a notable local and national benefactor, with a number of donations made to the town of Wantage (the nearest town to Loyd-Lindsay's home). In 1877 he paid for a marble statue of King Alfred by Count Gleichen to be erected in Wantage market place, where it still stands today. He also donated the Victoria Cross Gallery to the town. This contained paintings by Louis William Desanges depicting deeds which led to the award of a number of VCs, including his own gained during the Crimean War.

== Abingdon School ==
He had a close relationship with Abingdon School where he was on the governing body until his death in 1901. He donated money to the school in addition to regularly presenting prizes at events. After his death Lady Wantage continued the connection and Lord Wantage still has a room named after him at the school today.

== Personal life ==
Lord and Lady Wantage lived at Lockinge House at East Lockinge in Berkshire (now Oxfordshire), and had a London house at 2 Carlton Gardens. He died on 10 June 1901, aged 69. On his death, Florence Nightingale, a close personal friend since the Crimea, wrote:

Lord Wantage is a great loss but he had been a great gain. And what he has gained for us can never be lost. It is my experience that such men exist only in England. A man who had everything (to use the common phrase) that this world could give him, but who worked as hard, and to the last, as the poorest able man and all for others for the common good. A man whose life makes a great difference for all. All are better than if he had not lived, and this betterment is for always it does not die with him. That is the true estimate of a great life. God bless him and we will bless him. And we will bless God for having made him.

Lady Wantage erected a monument to Lord Wantage on the Ridgeway. There are various inscriptions on the faces of the monument with the one on the North East side, being in Latin and is similar to that inscribed on the Iona Cross on Gibbet Hill, Hindhead, Surrey, namely:

IN OBITU PAX
POST OBITUM SALUS
POST TENEBRAS LUX
IN LUCE SPES

Which translates as: "Peace in passing away. Salvation after death. Light after darkness. Hope in light."

As he had no children the title died with him. In 1908 Lady Wantage officially opened Wantage Hall, the first Hall of Residence in the University of Reading, in honour of Lord Wantage. She died in August 1920.

Parliament of the United Kingdom
Preceded by Philip Pleydell-Bouverie; John Walter; Richard Benyon	Member of Parliament for Berkshire; 1865–1885; With: Richard Benyon 1865–1876; Sir Charles Russell, Bt 1865–1868; John Walter 1868–1885; Philip Wroughton 1876–1885	Constituency abolished
Political offices
Preceded by Hon. Frederick Stanley	Financial Secretary to the War Office; 1877–1880	Succeeded by Henry Campbell-Bannerman
Honorary titles
Preceded by The Marquess of Ailesbury	Lord Lieutenant of Berkshire; 1886–1901	Succeeded by James Herbert Benyon
Peerage of the United Kingdom
New creation	Baron Wantage; 1885–1901	Extinct
