= Samuel Jones-Loyd, 1st Baron Overstone =

British Whig politician and banker

The Right Honourable The Lord Overstone

Member of Parliament for Hythe
- In office 1819–1826

Personal details
- Born: Samuel Jones-Loyd; 25 September 1796
- Died: 17 November 1883 (aged 87)
- Party: Whig
- Spouse: Harriet Wright (m. 1829; died 1864)
- Children: 2, including Harriet
- Education: Trinity College, Cambridge
- Occupation: Banker

Samuel Jones-Loyd, 1st Baron Overstone (25 September 1796 – 17 November 1883) was a British banker and politician.

== Background and education ==
Loyd was the only son of the Rev. Lewis Loyd and Sarah, daughter of John Jones, a Manchester banker. He was educated at Eton and Trinity College, Cambridge.

== Banking ==
Loyd's father had given up the ministry to take a partnership in his father-in-law's bank and became the founder of the London branch of Jones, Loyd & Co. Loyd joined his father's bank, and took control of the bank after his father retired in 1844. On his father's death in 1858 Loyd inherited an estate worth £ 2 million. In 1864 the bank became incorporated with the London and Westminster Bank.

== Political career ==
Loyd sat in parliament as Whig member for Hythe from 1819 to 1826, and unsuccessfully contested Manchester in 1832. As early as 1832 he was recognized as one of the foremost authorities on banking, and he enjoyed much influence with successive ministries and chancellors of the exchequer. Loyd is considered one of the great figures in British monetary history, particularly with respect to the Bank Charter Act 1844. He was also opposed to limited liability and the introduction of a decimal currency. In 1850 he was raised to the peerage as Baron Overstone, of Overstone and of Fotheringhay, both in the County of Northampton. Lord Overstone was a member of The Club (Literary Club) and the Political Economy Club and served as High Sheriff of Warwickshire in 1838 and as President of the Royal Statistical Society from 1851 to 1853. In 1847 and 1848, he served on the committee of the British Relief Association, which raised almost half a million pounds on behalf of the famine victims in Ireland. (see, Christine Kinealy, Charity and the Great Hunger. The Kindness of Strangers'. Bloomsbury, 2013)

== Family ==
Lord Overstone married Harriet, daughter of Ichabod Wright, in 1829. They had one son, who died as an infant, and a daughter. His seat was Overstone House, Overstone, Northamptonshire built in 1862–4 to a design by William Milford Teulon, brother of the more eminent - and notorious 'Rogue' - Victorian architect Samuel Sanders Teulon. Lady Overstone died on 6 November 1864. Overstone remained a widower until his death on 17 November 1883, aged 87. The barony died with him as he had no surviving male issue. His will was proven on 31 December at £2,118,803 17s. 5d. (roughly equivalent to £222,743,896 in 2025).

The majority of Overstone's fortune was passed on to his daughter, Harriet. She was the wife of Robert Lindsay, who assumed the additional surname of Loyd and was created Baron Wantage in 1885. Overstone's relative Lewis Vivian Loyd, the son of his second cousin William Jones Loyd, inherited part of the estate, including the manor of Withybrook, Wolvey, Warwickshire.

Parliament of the United Kingdom
Preceded by John Bladen Taylor; Sir John Perring, Bt	Member of Parliament for Hythe; 1819–1826; With: Sir John Perring 1819–1820; Stewart Marjoribanks 1820–1826	Succeeded by Stewart Marjoribanks; Sir Robert Townsend-Farquhar, Bt
Honorary titles
Preceded by Henry Cadwallader Adams	High Sheriff of Warwickshire; 1838	Succeeded by Sir Francis Lawley, Bt
Peerage of the United Kingdom
New creation	Baron Overstone; 1850–1883	Extinct
