= East Lockinge =

Village in the United Kingdom

Coordinates: 51.584°N 1.388°W

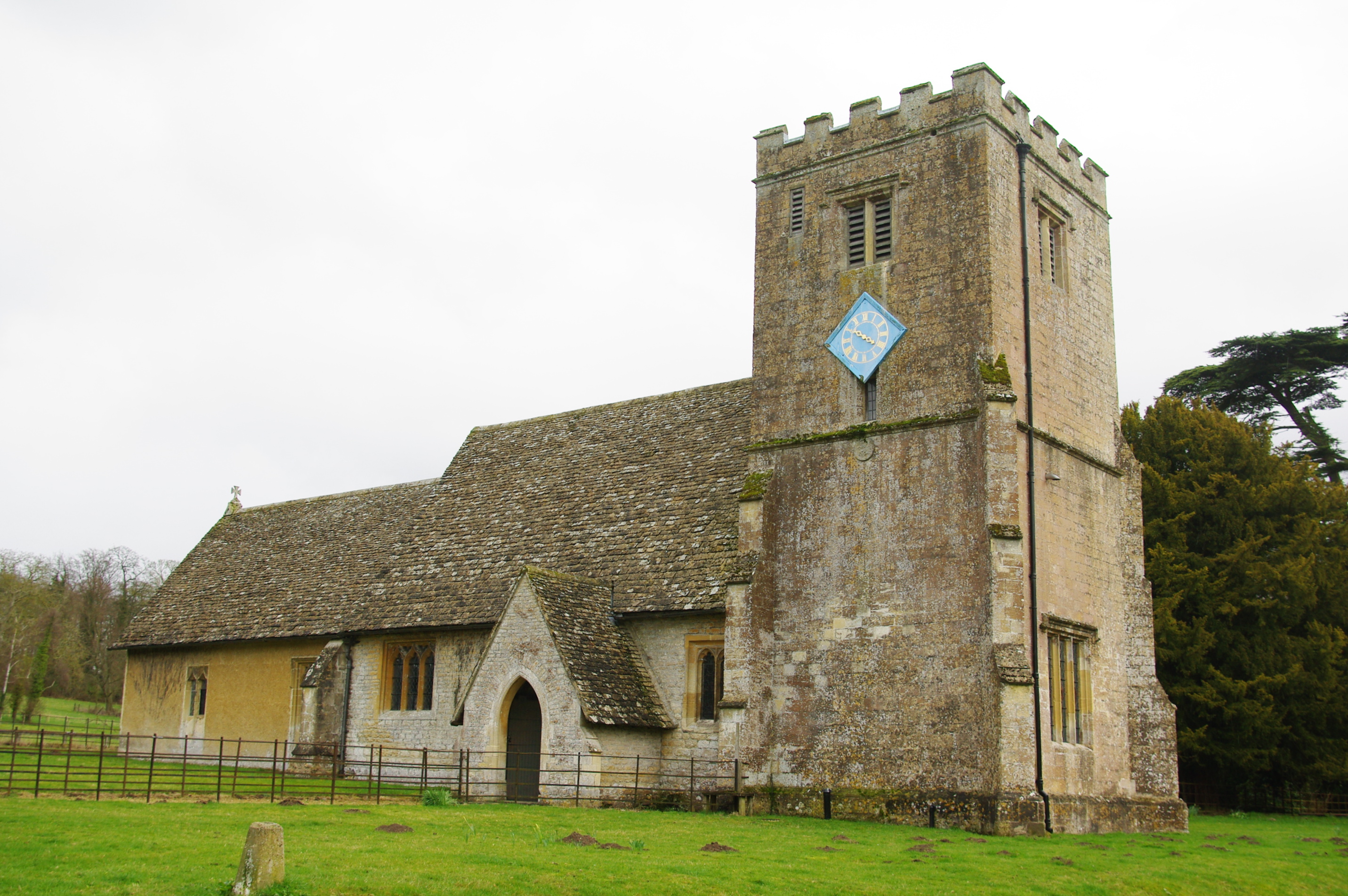
- All Saints' parish church

- Location within Oxfordshire
- OS grid reference: SU4287
- Civil parish: Lockinge
- District: Vale of White Horse
- Shire county: Oxfordshire
- Region: South East
- Country: England
- Sovereign state: United Kingdom
- Post town: Wantage
- Postcode district: OX12
- Dialling code: 01235
- Police: Thames Valley
- Fire: Oxfordshire
- Ambulance: South Central
- UK Parliament: Didcot and Wantage
- Website: Ardington and Lockinge Parish Council

East Lockinge is a village in the civil parish of Lockinge, in the Vale of White Horse district of Oxfordshire, England. It was part of Berkshire until the 1974 local authority boundary changes transferred the Vale of White Horse to Oxfordshire. It is about 1.5 miles (2.4 km) east of Wantage, the village is included within the North Wessex Downs Area of Outstanding Natural Beauty (AONB).

== History ==
=== Manor ===
In 868 Queen Æthelswith of Mercia granted 15 hides of land to her thegn Cuthwulf. This land became the manor of East Lockinge, which during the Anglo-Saxon era came to be held by the Benedictine Abingdon Abbey. After the Norman Conquest of England the manor was granted to the Norman soldier Henry de Ferrers. In the dissolution of the monasteries in the 1530s the Abbey surrendered all its property to the Crown, which sold East Lockinge in 1546.

Matthew Wymondsold (died 1757), a speculator in the South Sea Bubble, bought the manor in 1718 and settled here. In 1750 he had Lockinge House built: a three-storey Georgian country house with two wings that was later enlarged. Matthew was a descendant of Sir Robert Wymondsold (died 1687) of Welbeck Place, Putney, and Deeping St. James, Lincolnshire, whom James II knighted in 1684. Matthew Wymondsold had three sons by his wife Sara who outlived him: Francis, William and Charles, the latter who married and divorced Henrietta Knight, daughter of Robert Knight, 1st Earl of Catherlough, who married secondly Josiah Child, younger son of Richard Child, 1st Earl Tylney. The Wymondsold family retained East Lockinge until 1853, when it was sold to Lord Overstone.

In 1858 Overstone gave East Lockinge as a wedding present to his daughter Harriet Sarah Jones-Loyd upon her marriage to Colonel Loyd-Lindsay VC. East Lockinge is now a village of estate cottages that Colonel Loyd-Lindsay had built in the 1860s. Loyd-Lindsay was ennobled on 23 July 1885 taking the name, style and title of Baron Wantage of Lockinge in the County of Berks. He died at Lockinge House on 10 June 1901. Lockinge House was demolished in 1947. Its early Georgian orangery was still standing in the 1960s.

=== Administrative history ===
East Lockinge was an ancient parish in the Wantage hundred of Berkshire. East Lockinge and neighbouring West Lockinge were merged into a new civil parish called Lockinge in 1934. At the 1931 census (the last before the abolition of the parish), East Lockinge had a population of 227.

== Parish church ==
The Church of England parish church of All Saints was built in about the middle of the 12th century. The Norman north door of the nave survives from this time. The chancel and the south chapel parallel with it were built in the 13th century but the chancel was rebuilt early in the 14th century. A south aisle was added in the 13th or early in the 14th century. A window in the north wall of the nave was added in the 15th century, but was altered to accommodate the west belltower that was added in 1564. In 1886 the south aisle and chapel were demolished, the three-bay arcade between the south aisle and the nave was rebuilt and a new nave and chancel were built in place of the demolished aisle and chapel. This became the main body of the church, leaving the earlier nave and chancel as a north aisle and chapel.

The reredos paintings are by the Arts and Crafts movement artist Kate Bunce and their beaten metal frames are by her sister Myra Bunce. Lady Jane Lindsay, presumably a relative of the Colonel, designed the glass of the east window. The tower has a ring of four bells. The oldest is the treble, cast in 1578 by Joseph Carter of Reading, Berkshire, who later became the master founder of the Whitechapel Bell Foundry in London. The third bell was cast at Reading in about 1599. Robert II Wells of Aldbourne, Wiltshire cast the tenor bell in 1793 and he and James Wells cast the small Sanctus bell in about 1795. William Taylor cast the second bell in 1852, presumably at the foundry that the Taylor family then had in Oxford. Currently for technical reasons the bells are unringable.

== Sources ==
- Crisp, Samuel (1905). Hutton, Very Rev. William Holden (ed.). Burford Papers: Being Letters of Samuel Crisp to His Sister at Burford; And Other Studies of a Century (1745-1845). London: Archibald Constable & Co. p. 165.
- Havinden, Michael (1999). Estate Villages Revisited. Reading: University of Reading. ISBN 070491-05-19.
- Lysons, Rev. Daniel (1792). The Environs of London: Being An Historical Account of the Towns, Villages and Hamlets Within Twelve Miles of That Capital Interspersed with Biographical Anecdotes. Vol. the First, County of Surrey. London. pp. 404–435.
- Page, W.H.; Ditchfield, P.H., eds. (1924). A History of the County of Berkshire, Volume 4. Victoria County History. pp. 307–311.
- Pevsner, Nikolaus (1966). Berkshire. The Buildings of England. Harmondsworth: Penguin Books. pp. 169–170.
