= William Reynolds (VC) =

Recipient of the Victoria Cross

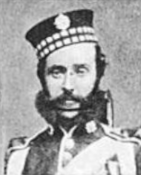
- Born: 1827; Edinburgh, Scotland
- Died: 20 October 1869 (aged 41–42); Strand, London, England
- Burial place: Brookwood Cemetery, London
- Military career
- Allegiance: United Kingdom
- Branch: British Army
- Rank: Corporal
- Units: Scots Fusilier Guards
- Conflicts: Crimean War
- Awards: Victoria Cross

William Reynolds VC (1827 – 20 October 1869) was a Scottish recipient of the Victoria Cross, the highest and most prestigious award for gallantry in the face of the enemy that can be awarded to British and Commonwealth forces. Reynolds was the first private to receive the award.

== Details ==
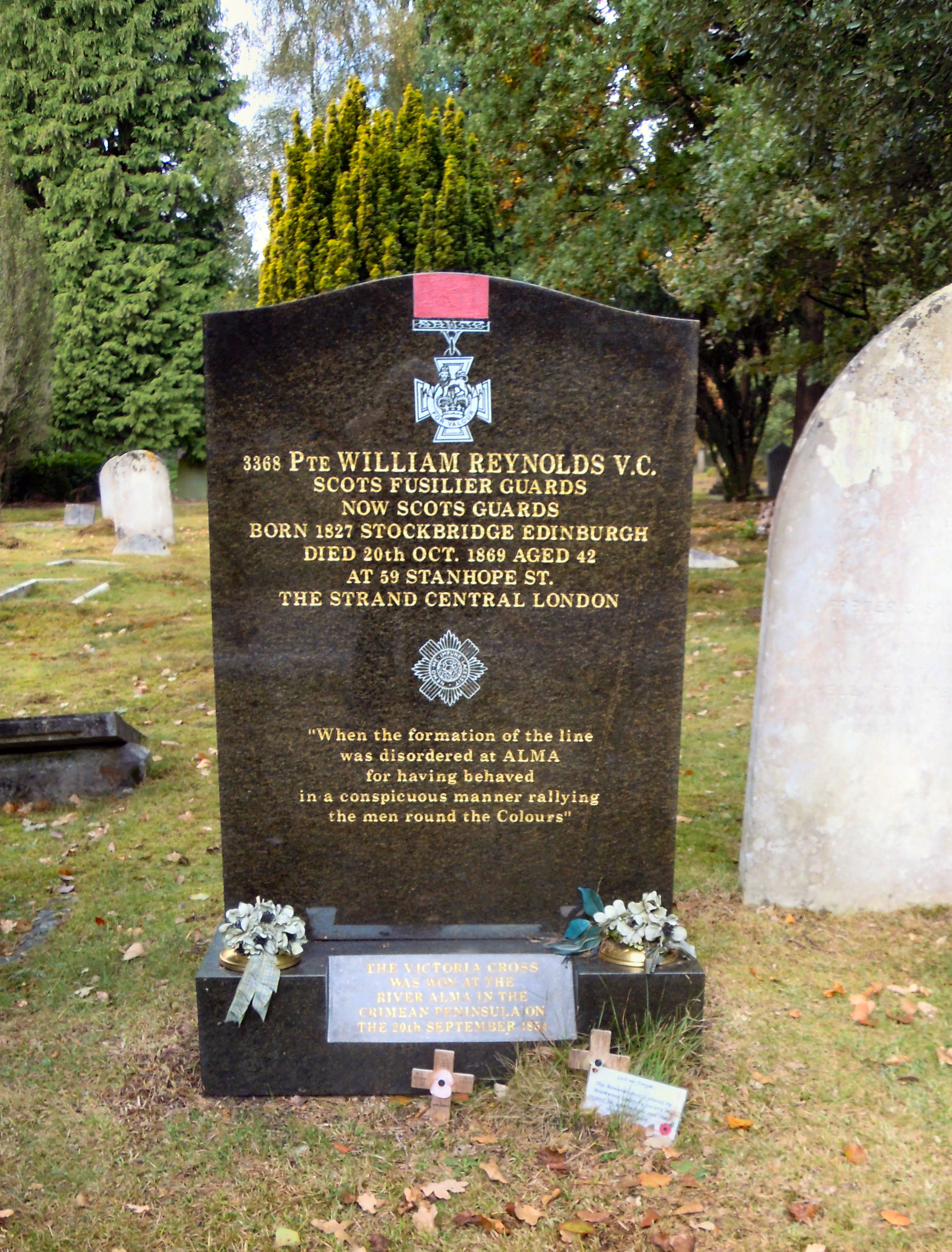
Reynolds' grave in Brookwood Cemetery

He was about 27 years old, and a private in the Scots Fusilier Guards, British Army during the Crimean War when the following deed took place for which he was awarded the VC.

On 20 September 1854 at the Battle of the Alma, Crimean Peninsula, when the formation of the line was disordered, Private Reynolds behaved with conspicuous gallantry, in rallying the men round the Colours.

Reynolds was personally presented with the Victoria Cross by Queen Victoria at the first VC investiture held at Hyde Park, London, on 26 June 1857.

He later achieved the rank of corporal.

== Medal ==
His Victoria Cross is displayed at The Guards Regimental Headquarters (Scots Guards RHQ), Wellington Barracks, Chelsea, London, England.
