= Overstone Park School =

Location
- Overstone Park, Overstone; Northampton, Northamptonshire, NN6 0DT; England; 52.281°N 0.814°W

Information
- Religious affiliation: Christian
- Established: 1983
- Founder: Corville and Marion Brown
- Principal: Marion Brown
- Gender: Mixed
- Age: 3 Months to 18 Years
- Enrolment: 106
- Website: http://www.overstoneparkschool.co.uk

Overstone Park School is a private co-educational day school near Northampton, England, for pupils aged 3 months to 18 years.

== School ==
The school was established in 1983 by husband and wife Corville Oliver Brown and Marion Faith Brown. Mrs. Brown is now the Principal of the school, while Mr. Brown is the Bursar. The school is housed in a purpose-built building on a 12-acre (49,000 m^{2}) site in the 340-acre (1.4 km^{2}) Overstone country park in Northamptonshire. The school comprises four departments: the nursery (3 months – 2 years); pre-preparatory school (2–4 years); preparatory school (4–10 years); high school (10–18 years). The school has a Christian foundation. There are sixty-five boys and forty-one girls enrolled at the school.

== Notable former pupils ==
- VV Brown: singer and daughter of Corville and Marion Brown, bursar and principal of the school.
