= James McKechnie =

Scottish recipient of the Victoria Cross

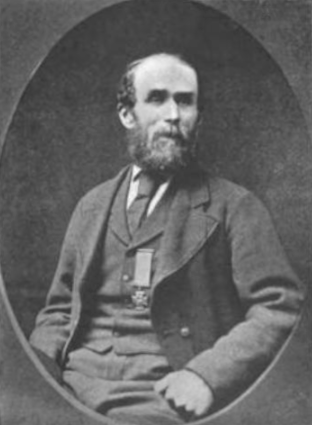
- Born: 30 June 1826; Paisley, Renfrewshire, Scotland
- Died: 5 July 1886 (aged 60); Glasgow, Scotland
- Burial place: Eastern Necropolis, Glasgow
- Military career
- Allegiance: United Kingdom
- Branch: British Army
- Rank: Sergeant
- Units: Scots Fusilier Guards
- Conflicts: Crimean War
- Awards: Victoria Cross

James McKechnie VC (30 June 1826 – 5 July 1886) was a Scottish recipient of the Victoria Cross, the highest and most prestigious award for gallantry in the face of the enemy that can be awarded to British and Commonwealth forces.

== Details ==
He was born to Colin McKechnie and Jane McKechnie (Nee McGregor) and was married to an Elizabeth McLean.

McKechnie was 28 years old, and a sergeant in the Scots Fusilier Guards, British Army during the Crimean War when the following deed took place for which he was awarded the VC.

On 20 September 1854 at the Battle of the Alma, Crimea, when the shot and fire from the batteries just in front of the battalion threw it into momentary disorder, it was forced out of its formation, becoming something of a huge triangle, with one corner pointing towards the enemy. A captain was carrying the Queen's Colour which had the pole smashed and 20 bullet holes through the silk. Sergeant McKechnie held up his revolver and dashed forward, rallying the men round the Colours. He was wounded in the action.

McKechnie was personally presented with the Victoria Cross by Queen Victoria at the first VC investiture held at Hyde Park, London, on 26 June 1857.

In 2015, Kier Homes named a street in their Hawkhead Village development in Paisley, James McKechnie Avenue, in memory of him.

== The medal ==
His Victoria Cross is displayed at The Guards Regimental Headquarters (Scots Guards RHQ) in Wellington Barracks, Chelsea, London.
