= Ardington =

Village in Oxfordshire, England

Coordinates: 51.593°N 1.379°W

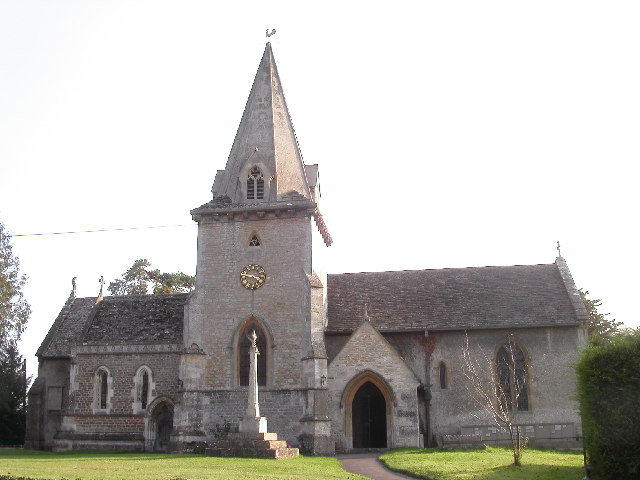
- Holy Trinity parish church

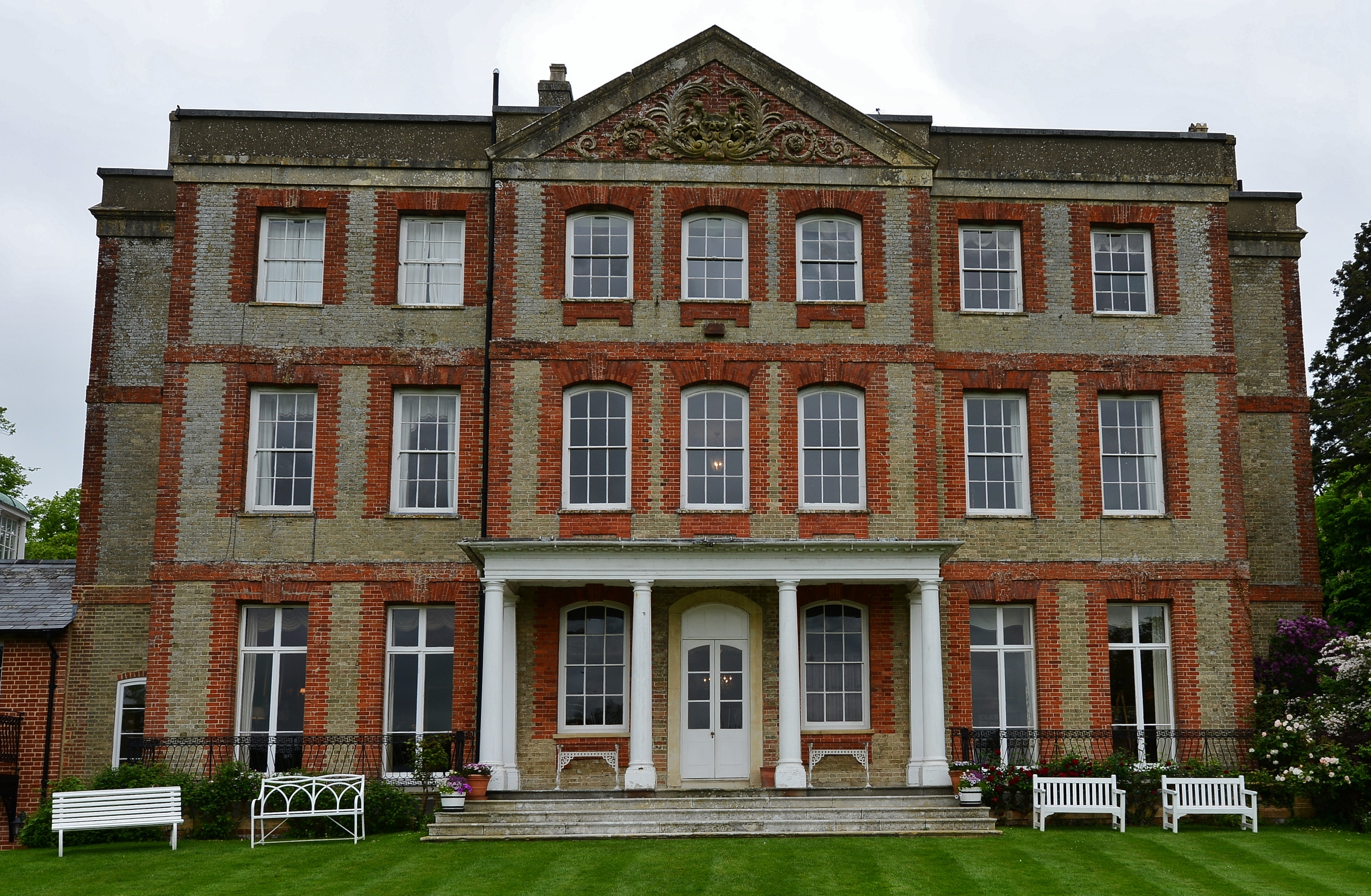
- Ardington House

- Location within Oxfordshire
- Area: 10.89 km^{2} (4.20 sq mi)
- Population: 288 (Parish, 2021)
  - Density: 26/km^{2} (67/sq mi)
- OS grid reference: SU4388
- Civil parish: Ardington
- District: Vale of White Horse
- Shire county: Oxfordshire
- Region: South East
- Country: England
- Sovereign state: United Kingdom
- Post town: Wantage
- Postcode district: OX12
- Dialling code: 01235
- Police: Thames Valley
- Fire: Oxfordshire
- Ambulance: South Central
- UK Parliament: Didcot and Wantage
- Website: Ardington and Lockinge Parish Council

Ardington is a village and civil parish about 2 miles (3 km) east of Wantage in the Vale of White Horse. It was part of Berkshire until the 1974 boundary changes transferred it to Oxfordshire. Since 2000, Ardington has shared a grouped parish council with the neighbouring parish of Lockinge. In 2011 the parish had a population of 288.

== Geography and economy ==
Ardington is a downland village, with its parish stretching from the loam-rich north to the chalk downlands to the south. The ancient path of the Ridgeway runs through the southern part of the parish, along the North Wessex Downs AONB section of the route. Racing stables are beside and around the village most of which use the Downs for gallops. Much of the land in the parishes of Ardington and Lockinge forms part of the Lockinge Estate. Local amenities in Ardington include a public house - The Boar's Head, a sports club, village store, post office and tearoom, and the Loyd-Lindsay Rooms - a set of rooms which are let out to the community and on a commercial basis for weddings, parties and conferences. Local charities can use the rooms to hold events to raise money.

Ardington Wick is a hamlet a short distance north of the village.

== Notable buildings ==
The oldest part of the Church of England parish church of Holy Trinity is the chancel arch, built about 1200. The Gothic Revival architect Joseph Clarke added the tower and spire in 1856. Somers Clarke remodelled the remainder of the church in 1887.

Ardington House was built for Edward Clarke in 1721 and has three tall storeys and seven window bays in breadth, not being deep, almost rectangular. It has small wings without bays to each side (alternatively the entire front range can be described as projecting) topped by a classical triangular pediment framing a weathered mid-19th century coat of arms in stone (cartouche). Its windows and central door are faced in complementary coloured brickwork dressings to its general grey brick façade. It is a Georgian Grade II* listed building and is open to the public in the summer months.

== Governance ==
There are three tiers of local government covering Ardington, at parish, district and county level: Ardington and Lockinge Parish Council, Vale of White Horse District Council, and Oxfordshire County Council. The parish council is a grouped parish council, set up in 2000 to cover the two parishes of Lockinge and Ardington. The parish council generally meets at the Loyd-Lindsay Rooms in Ardington.

=== Administrative history ===
Ardington was an ancient parish in the Wantage hundred of Berkshire. Ardington was transferred from Berkshire to Oxfordshire in 1974 under the Local Government Act 1972.

== Sources ==
- Page, W.H.; Ditchfield, P.H., eds. (1924). A History of the County of Berkshire, Volume 4. Victoria County History. pp. 269–272.
- Pevsner, Nikolaus (1966). Berkshire. The Buildings of England. Harmondsworth: Penguin Books. pp. 66–68.
