= Overstone Hall =

Listed building in Northamptonshire, England

- The Main House
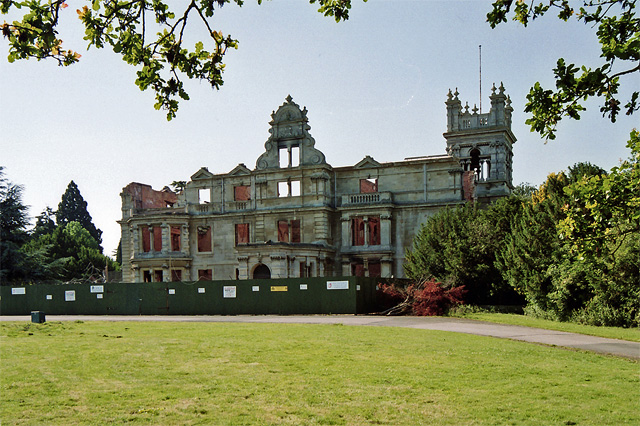
- The burnt out shell of Overstone Hall in 2002.
- Interactive map of Overstone Hall
- 52.28304823415709°N 0.8170926774678292°W
- Location: West Northamptonshire, England

History
- Built: early 1860s
- Built for: Samuel Jones-Loyd, 1st Baron Overstone

Site notes
- Architect: William Milford Teulon
- Architectural style: Revivalist French Renaissance style
- Owner: Barry Howard Homes

Listed Building – Grade II
- Official name: Overstone College
- Designated: 27 April 1981 (Amended on 19 July 1985)
- Reference no.: 1025849

Overstone Hall is a Grade II listed stately home in West Northamptonshire, England.

== History ==
The house was built in the early 1860s for Samuel Jones-Loyd, 1st Baron Overstone and Lady Overstone, designed by architect William Milford Teulon in French Renaissance style. It was used as a girls' boarding school from the 1920s until 1979. Overstone Hall became derelict after being destroyed in a fire in April 2001. Part of the building unaffected by the fire was used for retirement flats from 2008 to 2014. In March 2023, another suspected arson reportedly occurred. In 2019, plans to restore the building into apartments had been rejected by the council. In April 2023 it was reported that the owners of the building were applying for its demolition. West Northamptonshire Council is yet to make a final decision. The Victorian Society opposes the plans. 80 people objected to the plans of the historic site's owners, Barry Howard Homes.
