= Harriet Loyd-Lindsay, Baroness Wantage =

British art collector and benefactor

The Lady Wantage
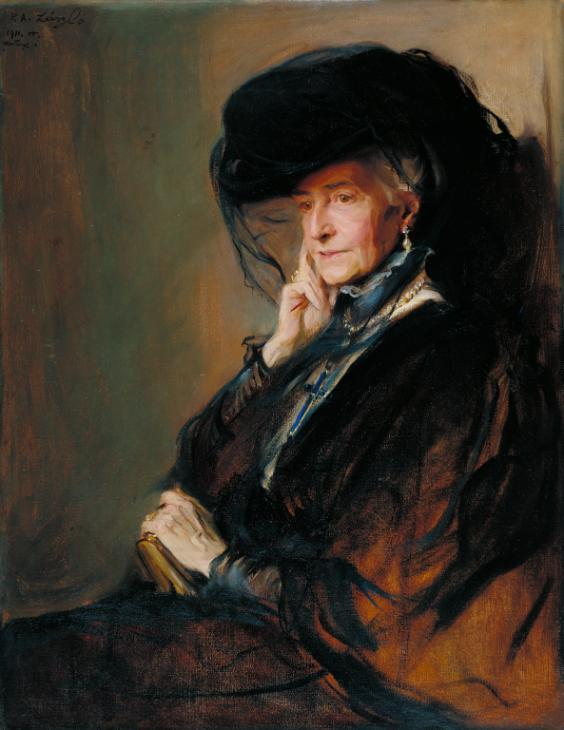
- Lady Wantage, 1911, by Philip Alexius de László
- Born: 30 June 1837
- Died: 9 August 1920 (aged 83)
- Spouse(s): Robert Loyd-Lindsay, 1st Baron Wantage (m. 1858, died 1901)
- Parent(s): Samuel Jones-Loyd, 1st Baron Overstone; Harriet Wright

Harriet Sarah Loyd-Lindsay (née Jones-Loyd), Baroness Wantage (30 June 1837 – 9 August 1920), was a British art collector and benefactor.

She was the sole heiress to the fortune of her parents Harriet Wright and Samuel Jones-Loyd, 1st Baron Overstone, who gave her Lockinge House near Wantage as a wedding present when she married Robert Loyd-Lindsay in 1858. The couple lived at 2 Carlton Gardens, London, Lockinge House, Berkshire, and Overstone Hall and Ardington House.

She was a benefactor to many causes, most notably nursing, for which she founded the National Aid Society (later the British Red Cross Society). For this she was awarded the Royal Red Cross (RRC) by Queen Victoria in 1883. Two years later her husband was made peer of the realm and she wrote a biography of him which was published after his death. She is known for founding Wantage Hall and Abington Park.

Her large art collection at Lockinge House, which included J. M. W. Turner's High Street, Oxford, Claude Lorrain's Landscape with Psyche Outside the Palace of Cupid, and other works by modern artists as well as old masters, was largely dispersed and sold after her death. Her heir A. T. Loyd sold the principal paintings at Sotheby's, London, 28 Nov. 1945. Lockinge House was demolished in 1947, and the remainder of the collection was installed in a smaller house nearby.

Notable paintings in her collection were:

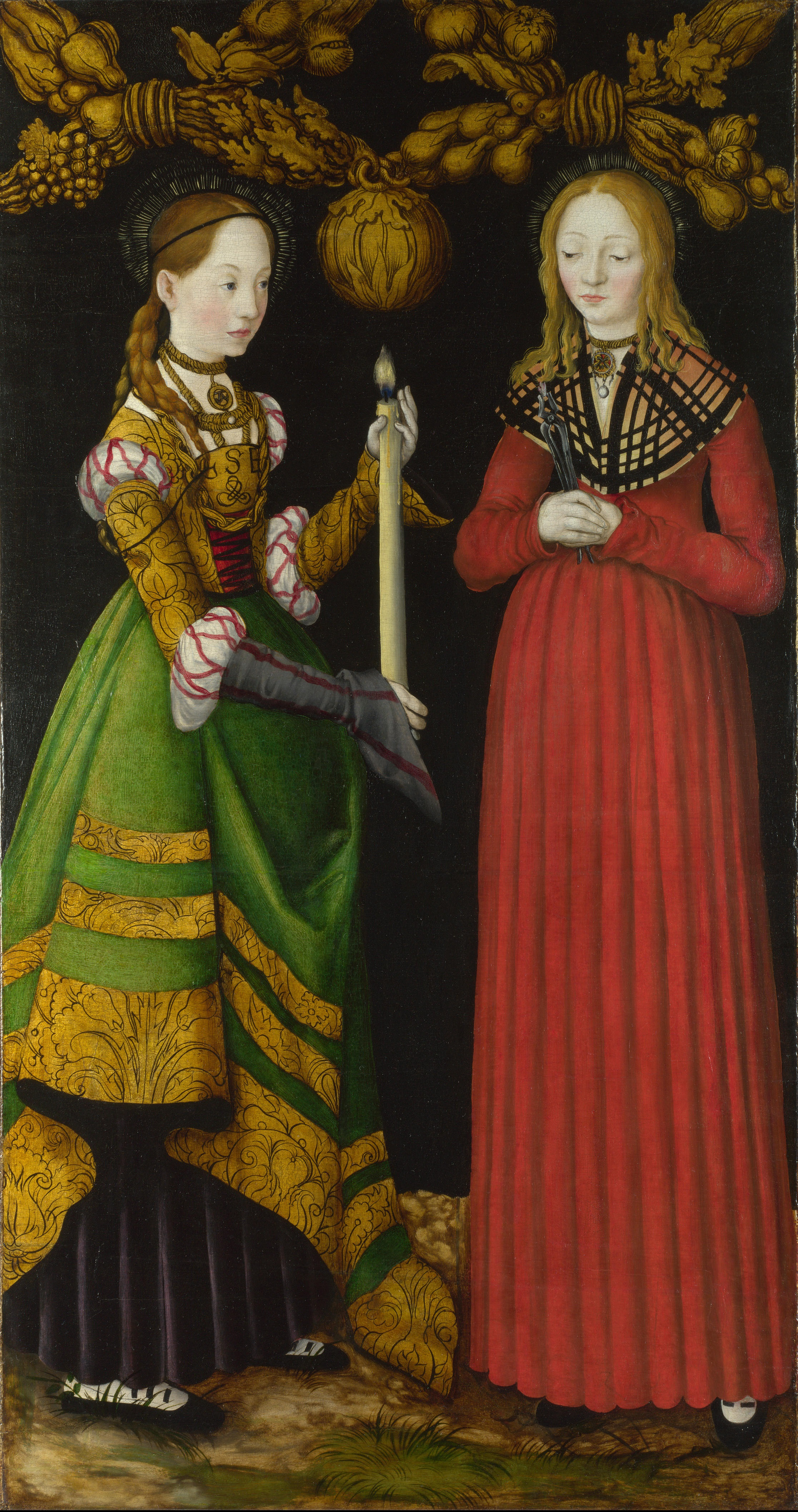
Saints Genevieve and Apollonia by Lucas Cranach the Elder

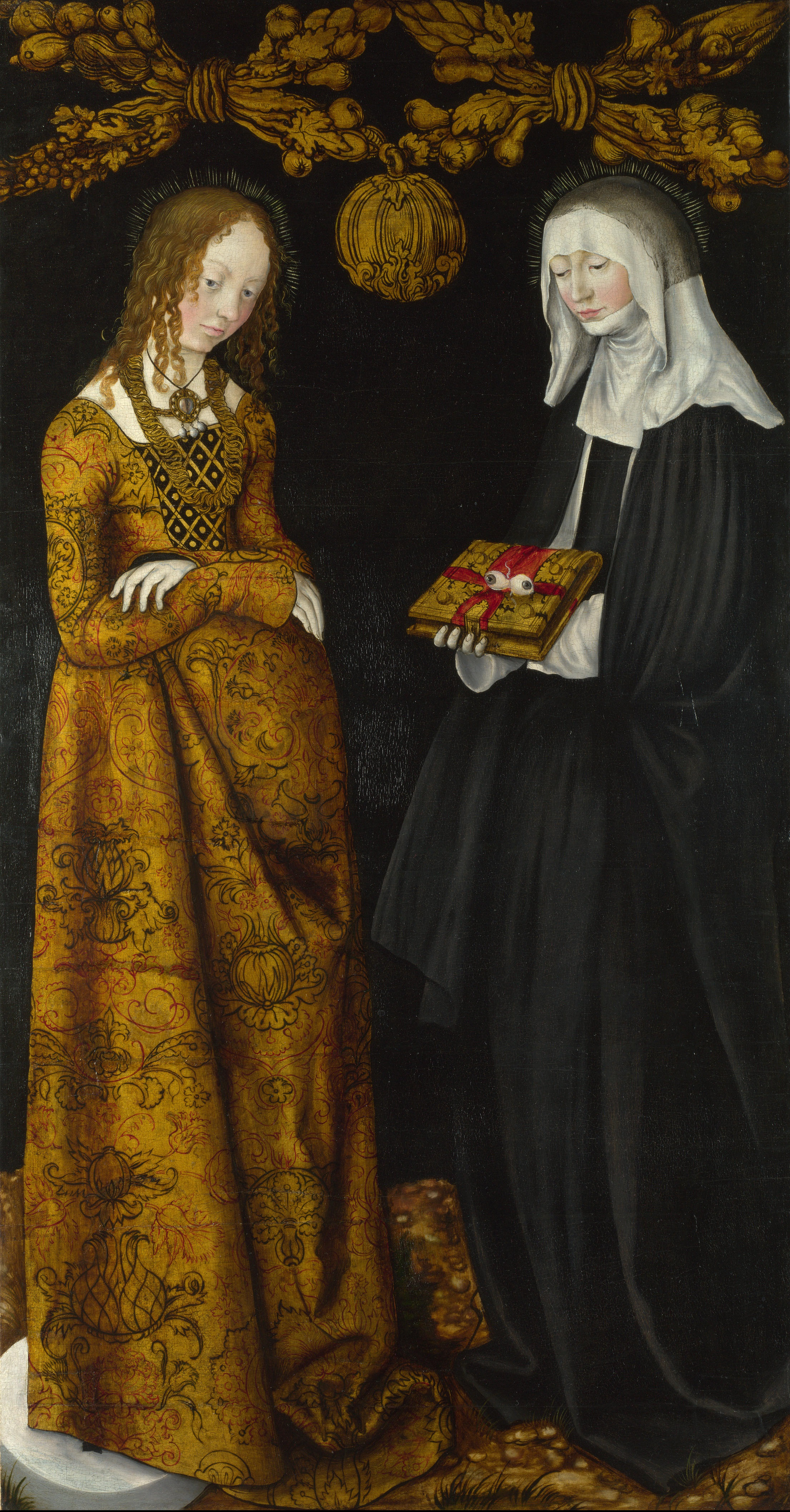
Saints Christina and Ottilia from St. Catherine's altarpiece by Lucas Cranach the Elder

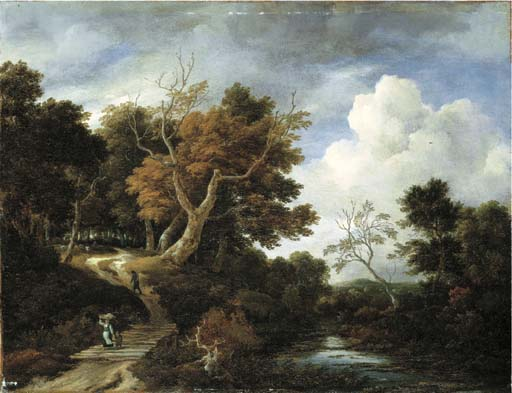
Landscape by Jacob van Ruisdael

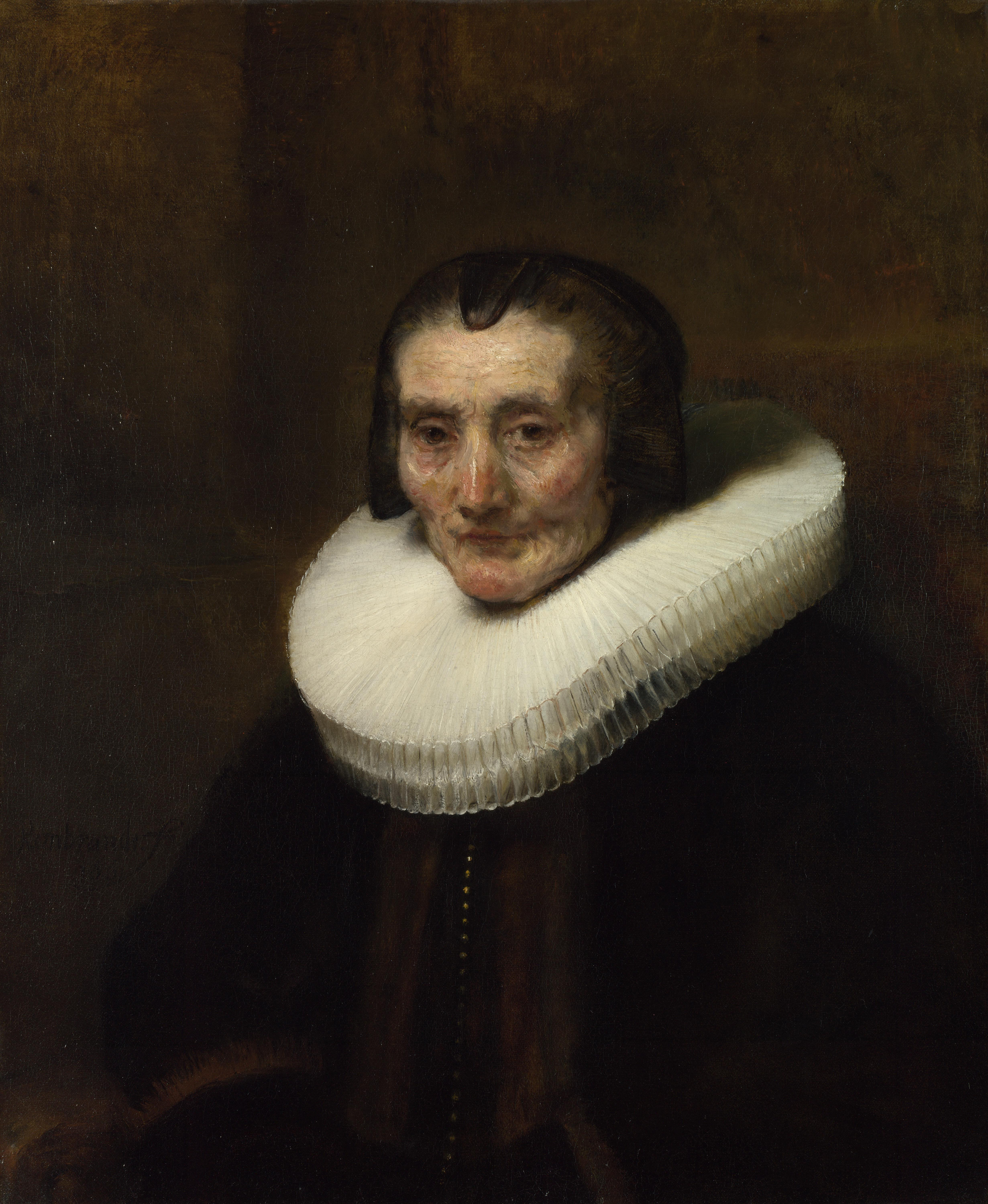
Portrait of Margaretha de Geer, wife of Jacob Trip, by Rembrandt

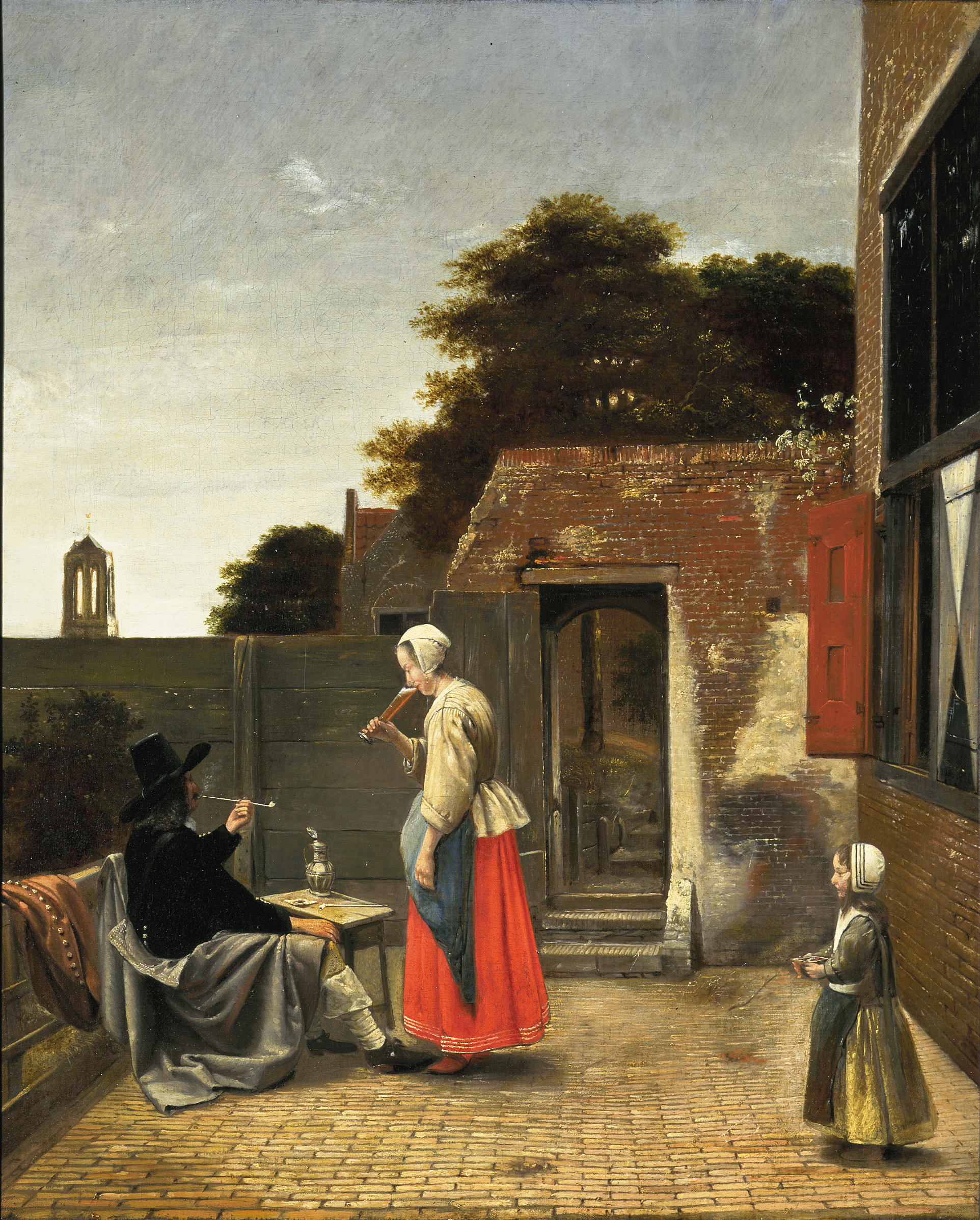
A Man Smoking and a Woman Drinking in a Courtyard, by Pieter de Hooch

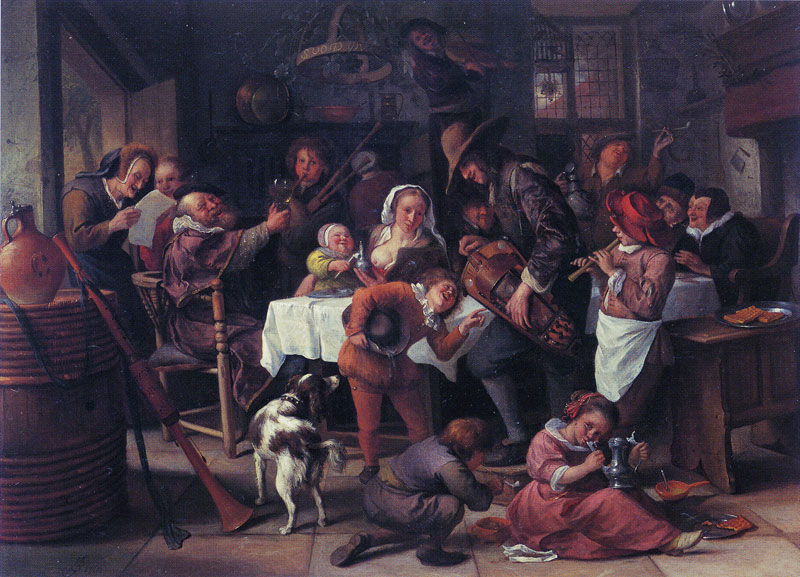
As the Old Sing, So the Young Pipe, y Jan Steen

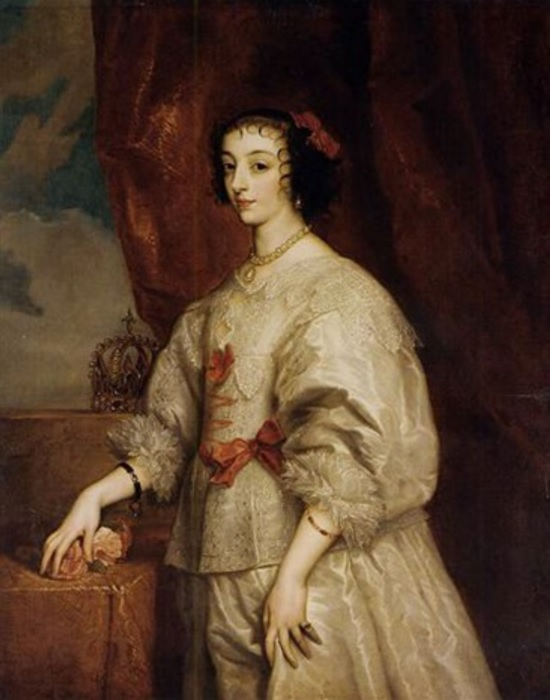
Portrait of Queen Henrietta Maria, by Anthony van Dyck
