= Bruce Lyttelton Richmond =

Sir Bruce Lyttelton Richmond (12 January 1871 – 1 October 1964) was a British editor and journalist who was the editor of the weekly literary review the Times Literary Supplement (TLS) for 35 years from a few months after its founding in 1902, to his retirement in 1937. His period of editorship is the longest to date, and during his time well over 1600 issues were produced with numerous reviews contributed by many literary figures. Richmond's obituary in The Times in 1964 described him as "The Architect of the Times Literary Supplement", while the authors of the introduction to the TLS Centenary Archive stated in 2001 that Richmond had "created and sustained one of the most durable of modern British institutions".

== Early life ==
Richmond was born in Kensington, London on 12 January 1871. His maternal grandfather was Henry Bruce, 1st Baron Aberdare. He was educated at Winchester College and New College, Oxford. While at Oxford, he represented the university in two first-class cricket matches. He graduated from Oxford in 1894, and then studied law, being called to the bar in London (Inner Temple) in 1897.

== Editorial career ==
In 1899, Richmond, at the request of the editor George Earle Buckle, became an assistant editor at The Times newspaper. In 1902, in addition to his existing editorial duties, Buckle appointed Richmond as editor of the Times Literary Supplement (TLS), a weekly literary review which at that time was a supplement to the parent newspaper. Richmond took over the editorship of the TLS from James Thursfield at a time when the TLS was only a few months old and when the publications were still owned by Arthur Fraser Walter. In 1908, ownership changed to Lord Northcliffe, who eventually forced Buckle's resignation in 1911. The new editor was George Geoffrey Dawson, and further change followed three years later in 1914 when the TLS became a separate publication. Richmond remained at the helm of the TLS and steered it through both these changes and later challenges.

Despite being published separately after 1914, close associations with The Times were retained, with Richmond and the TLS operating from the offices of The Times in Printing House Square, in Queen Victoria Street, London. Dawson, a close friend of Richmond, was editor of The Times through most of the remaining years of Richmond's editorship of the TLS, with the exception of the years 1919 to 1922, when the editor was Henry Wickham Steed. Also in this period, ownership of The Times changed in 1922 from Northcliffe to the Astor family.

The TLS Centenary Archive introduction (written in 2001) quotes one of Richmond's successors, John Gross, in describing Richmond's contribution to the success of the TLS as he guided it through its founding and early years:

"a self-effacing man, who was content to work behind the scenes and whose name never meant much to the literary public at large; but he deserves to be remembered as one of the most remarkable editors of his own or indeed of any epoch."

— John Gross, quoted from the TLS Centenary Archive introduction

Among those who reviewed for the TLS during Richmond's tenure as editor was William Francis Casey, later editor of The Times, and World War I poet Richard Aldington. Other contributors included Virginia Woolf, T. S. Eliot, Henry James and the poet laureate Robert Bridges. T. S. Eliot, referring to his founding of The Criterion in 1922, credited Richmond as his "chief editorial influence". During the period Richmond was editor, well over 100,000 books were reviewed by over 1000 reviewers. Those who worked with Richmond included David Leslie Murray, who joined the TLS in 1920 and succeeded Richmond as editor in 1938 following Richmond's retirement "on the last day of 1937".

During his period as TLS editor, Richmond lived in South Kensington, London, and later leased a second home near Robertsbridge, Sussex.

== Honours ==
Richmond's honours included two honorary Doctor of Letters degrees and a knighthood.

- 1922 – honorary D.Litt., University of Leeds
- 1930 – honorary D.Litt., University of Oxford
- 1935 – appointed Knight Bachelor

The speech for the 1930 conferral of Richmond's honorary degree from Oxford was given by A. B. Poynton.

== Later years ==
In 1913, Richmond had married Elena Elizabeth Rathbone (1878–1964), of the Rathbone family of Liverpool merchants and ship owners. They had no children, though Elena Richmond carried on her father's work in the field of nursing and midwifery, including honorary positions with the nursing charity, the Queen's Institute of District Nursing. Richmond and his wife moved in 1936 to Netherhampton, Wiltshire, to a house previously owned by the poet Sir Henry Newbolt, where they spent their retirement. Richmond was made a vice-president of the Royal Literary Fund in 1939. In 1940, during and in response to the Second World War, he published an anthology of verse and prose called The Pattern of Freedom. In 1946, Richmond was photographed by Walter Stoneman for the National Portrait Gallery.

Richmond wrote or contributed to two entries published in 1949 for the Dictionary of National Biography: George Earle Buckle (1854–1935), editor of The Times from 1884 to 1911; and the British music critic and scholar John Fuller-Maitland (1856–1936). Richmond also served for many years on the Council and executive committee of the Royal College of Music. In 1961, a tribute was written in the TLS by T. S. Eliot to mark Richmond's 90th birthday. In his later years, Richmond's mobility was restricted by arthritis, though he still used two walking sticks to attend performances of Shakespeare's plays at Stratford-upon-Avon. Richmond and his wife eventually moved to Islip, Oxfordshire, where he died on 1 October 1964 at the age of 93. He was survived by his wife who died six days later.
