= Logographic printing =

Form of moveable type printing

Logographic printing is a form of moveable type printing where the font comprises words or parts of words rather than single letters.

The system, whilst not widely adopted, was used to produce a number of books in the eighteenth century, as well as The Times or The Daily Universal Register as it was originally known.

The edition of 12 March 1788, for example was "printed Logographically" by "R. Nutkins" at the Logographic Press, Printing House Square, Blackfriars.

The press was owned, though, by John Walter, the founder of The Times who had acquired the printing system from its inventor, Henry Johnson .

Books published by the logographic system include Anderson's History of Commerce in four volumes, 1787–1789.

== History ==
Around the late 18th century, typefounder Henry Johnson had begun experimenting with different ways to increase the accuracy and speed of his work in printing lottery lists. He devised the system of ‘logography’ whereby the types for two or more numerals were joined together permanently. With the great increase to the productivity of printing numbers, Johnson turned to making a similar system utilising words instead.

Johnson employed several readers to study newspapers and standard works, such as The Spectator, to make lists of the words used. Through this study he was able to assemble a list of about 3500 words which would account for any requirement. To these words, he added ‘terminations,’ such as ‘ed,’ ‘ly,’ and ‘ing.’

== See also ==
- Printing House Square
