= T. E. Kebbel =

English journalist

Thomas Edward Kebbel (c. 23 November 1826 – 5 November 1917) was an English journalist.

He was born in Kilby, Leicestershire, the son of Rev. Henry Kebbel, vicar of Wistow and Kilby. He was educated at the Merchant Taylors' School and at Exeter College, Oxford and Lincoln College, Oxford, where he gained a second class BA in the Greats in 1849. He then studied law, being called by the Inner Temple in 1862.

He started his career in journalism in 1856, joining the Conservative-supporting Press newspaper. He would remain a supporter of the Conservative Party for the rest of his life. In 1873 he joined the Standard as a leader writer, where he also contributed articles on politics, sports and rural life. From 1858 he enjoyed a close friendship with Benjamin Disraeli. According to Lord Rowton, Disraeli had wanted Kebbel and Lord Barrington to write his official biography and that he had left written instructions to that effect. However, after Disraeli's death in 1881, Kebbel and Rowton examined Disraeli's papers at Hughenden Manor but no such instructions were found. The biography was then entrusted to William Flavelle Monypenny and completed by George Earle Buckle.

Kebbel's book The Agricultural Labourer was a success and went through four editions. After his death, The Times said that Kebbel was "always a countryman at heart...He was no mean sportsman; his happiest reminiscences were those of hours spent with dog and gun".

In 1873 Kebbel married Evelyn Catherine Clarke, who died in June 1912.

== Works ==
- Essays upon History and Politics (1864).
- English Statesmen Since the Peace of 1815 (1868).
- The Agricultural Labourer (1870; 2nd ed. 1887; 3rd ed. 1893; 4th ed. 1907).
- A History of Toryism: from the Accession of Mr. Pitt to Power in 1783 to the Death of Lord Beaconsfield in 1881 (1886; 1972 ed. with introduction by Edgar Feuchtwanger) ISBN 0855461683
- Life of George Crabbe (1888)
- The Old and the New English Country Life (1891).
- Lord Beaconsfield and Other Tory Memories (1907).
- The Battle of Life: A Retrospect of Sixty Years (1912).
