= Kebbel =

Kebbel is a surname. Notable people with the surname include:

- Arielle Kebbel (born 1985), American actress and model
- T. E. Kebbel (1826–1917), English journalist
