= Enid Moberly-Bell =

English writer and headmistress (1881–1967)

Enid Hester Chataway Moberly Bell (1881–1967) was an English writer of biographies and history who was founding headmistress of Lady Margaret School and vice-chairman of the first Lyceum Club.

== Life ==
Bell was born in 1881 in Alexandria, Egypt to Charles Moberly Bell, managing director of The Times, and Ethel Chataway. She was educated at Francis Holland School and gained an MA from Newnham College, Cambridge.

She became vice-chairman of the first Lyceum Club in 1904.

She worked at Auckland House School from 1905–8 and as a grammar school mistress in London in 1911–17.

In 1917, Whitelands College School was in danger of closing. Bell held a meeting with Bishop John Maud to argue that the school should survive. The school was moved to Parsons Green and became Lady Margaret School, and Bell served as its first headmistress for thirty years from 1917–47.

Bell wrote several books of history and biography, including the first biography of Octavia Hill and of her fellow Lyceum Club member Flora Shaw.

== Works ==
- Octavia Hill: A Biography (1942)
- Flora Shaw (Lady Lugard DBE) (1947)
- Storming the Citadel: The Rise of the Woman Doctor (1953)
- A History of the Church Schools Company, 1883–1958 (1958)
- The Story of Hospital Almoners: The Birth of a Profession (1961)
- Josephine Bell, Flame of Fire (1963)
