= The Egyptian Gazette =

- Type: Daily newspaper
- Format: Broadsheet
- Owner(s): El Tahrir Printing and Publishing House
- Editor: Mohamed Fahmy
- Founded: 26 January 1880; 146 years ago
- Political alignment: Nationalism, Secularism
- Headquarters: Cairo, Egypt
- Website: egyptian-gazette.com

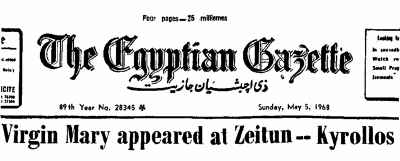
The Egyptian Gazette daily newspaper, issue 28345 (Vol. 89) of Sunday, May 5, 1968.

The Egyptian Gazette, first published on 26 January 1880, is the oldest English-language newspaper in the Middle East.

Today, the Egyptian daily is part of El Tahrir Printing and Publishing House. Eyad Abu El Haggag is chairman of the Gazette's board and Mohamed Fahmy has been the editor-in-chief since Sept. 27, 2020.

== History ==
The Egyptian Gazette was founded in 1880 as a four-page weekly tabloid in Alexandria by five Britons, including Andrew Philip, as editor, and Moberly Bell, later managing editor of The Times in London.

The newspaper's offices were moved to Cairo on 20 February 1938.

Shortly before World War II, ownership of The Egyptian Gazette passed to the Société Orientale de Publicité (SOP) (English: Eastern Publishing Company), in which Oswald J. Finney, a wealthy British businessman, was the major shareholder. The Egyptian Gazette found itself associated with The Egyptian Mail, another English-language Egyptian newspaper, founded in 1914, and also owned by the SOP. The market was split between the two dailies, with the Mail appearing in the morning, and the Gazette in the evening.

At the end of the war and with the departure of most of the British Army stationed in Egypt, the market for English-language newspapers shrank dramatically. As a result, and as continues to the present day, The Egyptian Gazette is published every day except Tuesdays, when the now-weekly The Egyptian Mail appears.

In May 1954, following the Egyptian Revolution of 1952 and the nationalization program of President Nasser, El Tahrir Printing and Publishing House took over ownership of the newspaper from the SOP. Amin Abul Enein was appointed managing editor, bringing the newspaper under the editorial authority of an Egyptian for the first time.

== Editorship ==
Year	Editor
1880 - 1899	Andrew V. Philip
1899 - 1922	Rowland Snelling
1952 - 1978	Amin Aboul-Enein
1978 - 1980	Ramez El Halawani
1980 - 1989	Sami el-Shahed
1989 - 1991	Mohamed el-Ezabi
1991 - 2005	Mohamed Ali Ibrahim
2005 - 2011	Ramadan Abdel Kader
2014 - 2020	Mohamed Kassem
2020 - now	Mohamed Fahmy
