= William Flavelle Monypenny =

Irish-born journalist and editor (1866–1912)

- Born: William Flavelle Monypeny; 7 August 1866; Portadown, Armagh, Ireland
- Died: 23 November 1912 (aged 46); New Forest, Hampshire, England
- Education: Trinity College Dublin Balliol College, Oxford
- Occupations: Journalist, editor and biographer

William Flavelle Monypenny (7 August 1866 – 23 November 1912) was an Irish-born journalist and editor whose career was split between London and South Africa. He was also the first biographer of Benjamin Disraeli.

Monypenny was the second son of an Ulster family of Scottish descent, born in Ballyworkan, south of Portadown, County Armagh, to William Monypeny, linen manufacturer and small landowner, and Mary Ann Flavell. William spelled his surname Monypeny until 1898. He attended the Royal School Dungannon and Trinity College Dublin, where he distinguished himself in mathematics, earning his BA in 1888. From there he attended Balliol College, Oxford, but left after a year due to ill health.

Monypenny received his start in journalism in London as a contributor to The Spectator. He joined the staff of The Times in 1893, where he was an assistant to the editor, George Earle Buckle. In early 1899, he accepted an offer to edit the Johannesburg Star, then an Uitlander publication in the Transvaal Republic. Monypenny was at the forefront in the subsequent political disputes leading up to the Second Boer War, and was forced to flee to Cape Colony prior to the outbreak of hostilities when a warrant of high treason was taken out against him. During the war, he served in the Imperial Light Horse and saw combat in Natal. He was also a member of the force trapped in Ladysmith during its besiegement by the Boers, which adversely affected his health. Monypenny subsequently served in Lord Milner's administration, where he was the director of civil supplies and participated in the rehabilitation of refugees after the annexation of the Transvaal. He was a member of Milner's Kindergarten.

After the war, Monypenny resumed the editorship of the Star, using it to support Milner's policies. He was unable to accept the emerging practice of importing Chinese labor, however, and resigned from the editorship in 1903. Upon his return to London, he resumed working for The Times, and was appointed a director of the Times Publishing Company in 1908. It was his work with The Times which led the directors to offer to him the opportunity to write the definitive biography of the former prime minister Benjamin Disraeli, using the papers Disraeli had bequeathed to his former secretary Lord Rowton. Though Monypenny's relative obscurity led some to question his selection, the first volume was critically praised upon his publication in October 1910. Monypenny only completed one more volume before dying of heart failure in 1912; the project was completed by George Earle Buckle, who wrote an additional four volumes. His work The Two Irish Nations; an Essay on Home Rule was published posthumously in 1913.
