= The Times Science Review =

The Times Science Review, founded in 1951 and discontinued in 1966, was The Times quarterly science review. The magazine started as The Times Review of the Progress of Science, but became better known as The Times Science Review.

In October 2009 The Times started Eureka, a monthly science magazine, and includes the 60-page magazine with The Times on the first Thursday of each month.

The Times Science Review is not on line. It can be accessed in print at the Newspaper Library at Colindale, London under System number: 013904756, starting with The Times Review of the Progress of Science no.'s 1-3 (Aug.1951 - Spring 1952), followed by no.4-60 Summer 1952 - Summer 1966 under Shelfmark: 1952-1966 LON LD2 NPL.

== DNA discovery unreported ==
In 1953 both The Times and its new Science Review supplement failed to report on James D. Watson's and Francis Crick's discovery of the structure of DNA. The discovery was made on 28 February 1953 and was announced by Sir Lawrence Bragg, the director of the Cavendish Laboratory where Watson and Crick worked, at the Solvay conference on proteins in Belgium on 8 April 1953. Bragg's announcement went unreported on by the press. Watson and Crick's paper then appeared in Nature magazine on 25 April 1953.

Bragg then discussed the discovery during a talk at Guy's Hospital Medical School in London on Thursday 14 May 1953. This resulted in an article by Ritchie Calder in the News Chronicle of London, on Friday 15 May 1953, entitled "Why You Are You. Nearer Secret of Life." The New York Times reported on it the next day in an article entitled "Form of 'Life Unit' in Cell Is Scanned". The article ran in the Times's early edition, but was pulled to make space for news deemed more important. (The New York Times subsequently ran a longer article on the discovery on 12 June 1953). The Cambridge University undergraduate newspaper Varsity ran a short article on the discovery on 30 May 1953.
