= Thomas Chenery =

English scholar and editor (1826–1884)

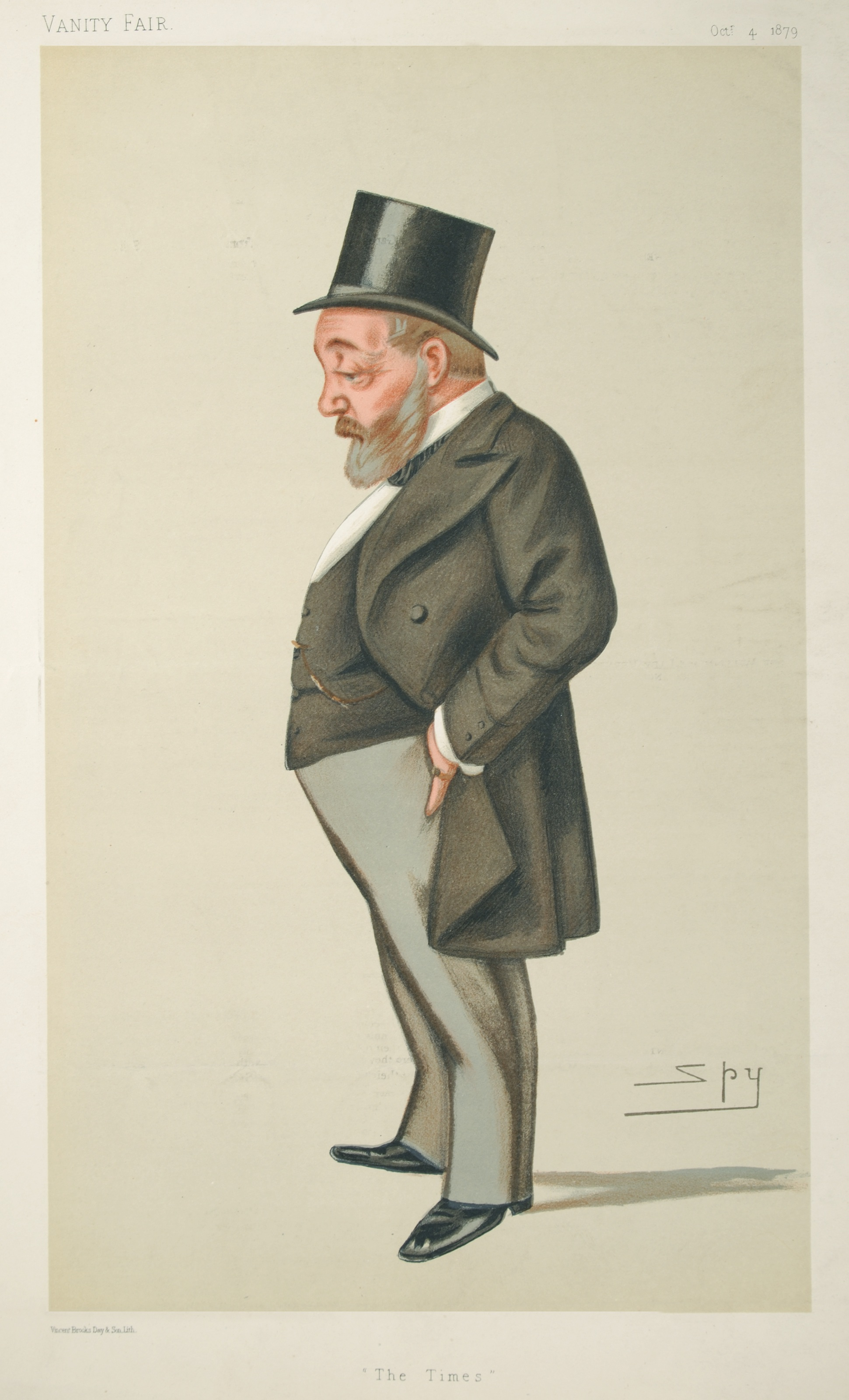
- Caricature by Spy published in Vanity Fair in 1879
- Born: 1826; Barbados
- Died: 11 February 1884 (aged 57–58); London, England
- Education: Gonville and Caius College, Cambridge
- Occupation: Editor of The Times
- Spouse: None

Thomas William Chenery (1826 – 11 February 1884) was an English scholar and editor of The Times. His diplomatic background and choice of capable reporters helped to revive the paper's reputation for international news.

== Biography ==
Chenery was born in Barbados in 1826 to John Chenery, a West Indies merchant. He was educated at Eton and Gonville and Caius College, Cambridge. Immediately after taking an ordinary degree in 1854, he was recruited by Mowbray Morris to work for The Times, and was sent to Istanbul. On arrival in March 1854, he soon proved himself an excellent diplomatic correspondent, covering the Crimean War, mainly from Istanbul, but occasionally from the front, where he relieved William Howard Russell. It was while he was in Istanbul that Chenery met Percy Smythe, who sparked his interest in philological studies, a field in which he would later gain prominence.

After the war, Chenery returned to London, as a leader writer for The Times for many years, while continuing his Oriental studies. Among the languages he spoke were Arabic, Hebrew, Greek, and Turkish. He was one of the panelists involved in preparing the Old Testament portion of the Revised Version of the Bible. Chenery's translation of the first 26 chapters of the Arabic classic The Assemblies of Al-Hariri led to an appointment as Lord Almoner's Professor of Arabic at the University of Oxford, where he also served as secretary of the Royal Asiatic Society.

In 1877, John Walker selected Chenery as John Thadeus Delane's successor as editor of The Times. He was then an experienced publicist, particularly well versed in Oriental affairs, and an indefatigable worker with a rapid and comprehensive judgement, although he lacked Delane's sociability and intuition for public opinion. Nonetheless, he introduced a number of innovations, bringing in more writers with scholarly backgrounds to employ their respective expertise. His background as a diplomatic correspondent and his choice of capable reporters for foreign postings revived the paper's reputation for international news coverage.

Despite his position as editor, Chenery was unable to prevent the increasingly partisan slant of the paper imposed by Walter, a member of the Conservative Party. This shift was furthered in 1880 by the appointment of George Earle Buckle, Walter's hand-picked candidate, as assistant editor. Buckle assumed more duties in 1883 as ill health reduced Chenery's ability to play an active role as editor, though he continued in the post until his death on 11 February 1884.

He is buried in Brompton Cemetery.

== Notes ==
Media offices
Preceded by John Thadeus Delane	Editor of The Times; 1877–1884	Succeeded by George Earle Buckle
