= Charles Frederic Moberly Bell =

British journalist and editor (1847–1911)

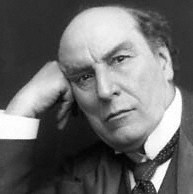
- Bell in 1907
- Born: 2 April 1847; Alexandria, Egypt
- Died: 5 April 1911 (aged 64); London, England
- Occupations: Journalist, editor and author
- Employer: The Times
- Notable credit(s): Khedives and Pashas (1884); Egyptian Finance (1887); From Pharaoh to Fellah (1889)
- Children: Enid Moberly Bell

Charles Frederic Moberly Bell (2 April 1847, Alexandria – 5 April 1911, London) was a British journalist and newspaper editor. He was the managing director of The Times during the late 19th and early 20th centuries, where his innovations included founding the forerunners of the Times Literary Supplement and the Times Educational Supplement and co-sponsoring the Encyclopedia Britannica.

== Early life ==
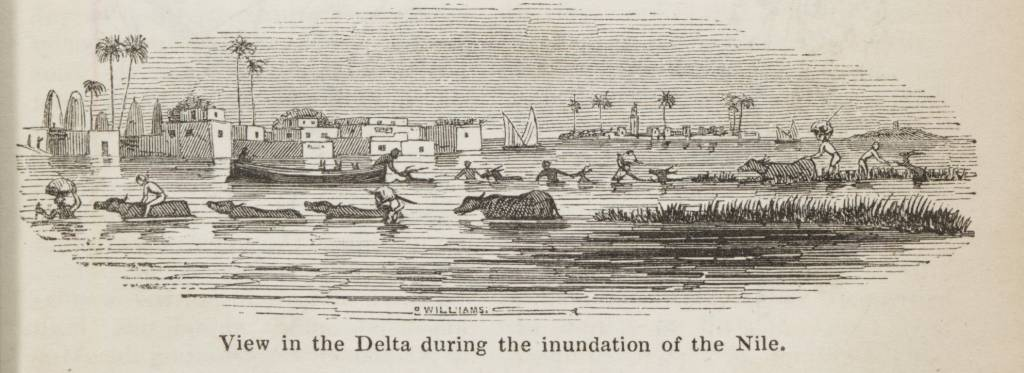
An Egyptian scene in the year of his birth

Charles Frederic Moberly Bell was born in Alexandria, Egypt, on 2 April 1847. His mother, Hester Louisa, née David, and his father, a merchant, both died when he was a child. Moberly Bell was sent to England to be raised by relatives and to receive his education. He returned to Alexandria in 1865 and briefly worked for Peel & Co., the same company his father had worked for.

== Journalism and The Times ==
Moberly Bell began his career in journalism with freelance work for The Times. In 1875, he became the official correspondent of The Times in Egypt and reported on the Urabi Revolt in 1882. Two years before the revolt, Moberly Bell founded The Egyptian Gazette.

During the bombardment of Alexandria in July 1882, Moberly Bell was aboard HMS Condor with fellow journalist Frederic Villiers. The ship's commander, Lord Charles Beresford, led an attack on Fort Marabut during the conflict.

In 1890, Bell was invited by The Times owner, Arthur Fraser Walter, to assist running the newspaper, which was facing financial difficulties despite its respected status. As managing director, Bell reorganized the newspaper, increasing its staff of foreign correspondents and revitalizing its operations. In 1902, Bell created Literature, a forerunner of The Times Literary Supplement, and in 1910, followed that supplement, or spin-off with The Times Educational Supplement. In 1908, Bell helped to engineer its sale to Alfred Harmsworth, later Lord Northcliffe. Bell remained with the paper until his death in 1911.

== Encyclopædia Britannica ==
Moberly Bell is also known for his involvement with the Encyclopædia Britannica. In 1898, he brokered a deal with Horace Everett Hooper to reprint and sell the 9th edition of the encyclopaedia under The Times's sponsorship. Hooper's marketing strategy helped to sell over 20,000 sets of the 9th edition, and the subsequent 10th edition saw even greater success, with more than 70,000 sets sold. The profit on the 10th edition was more than £600,000, and the royalties paid to the paper made it profitable for the first time in years. In 1908, The Times discontinued its sponsorship of the Encyclopædia Britannica due to a legal dispute between Hooper and his business partner Walter Montgomery Jackson.

== Writing ==
Bell wrote three books: Khedives and Pashas (1884), Egyptian Finance (1887), and From Pharaoh to Fellah (1888), illustrated by George Montbard and engraved by Charles Brabant.

== Personal life and family ==
In 1875, Moberly Bell married Ethel Chataway, a sister of Gertrude Chataway and Australian politicians James and Thomas Chataway. The couple had six children, two sons and four daughters.

One of their daughters, Enid (1881-1967), later became the founding headmistress of Lady Margaret School. Enid's published books included Storming The Citadel: The Rise of the Woman Doctor in 1953 which focussed on Elizabeth Garrett Anderson and a biography of her father, titled The Life and Letters of C. F. Moberly Bell, in 1927, sixteen years after his death. Committed to social justice, in 1930 Enid and Anne Lupton were the committee member and hon-secretary respectively of the Fulham Housing Improvement Society. Concerned with establishing homes and "shelters", the association "issued shares and loan stock at a low rate of interest and with the income built new housing and re-conditioned old property which was then let at affordable rents. Properties were administered by lady managers on the principles laid down by Octavia Hill". In 1946, Enid wrote Hill's biography.
