= John Walter (publisher) =

Englist newspaper publisher (1738–1812)

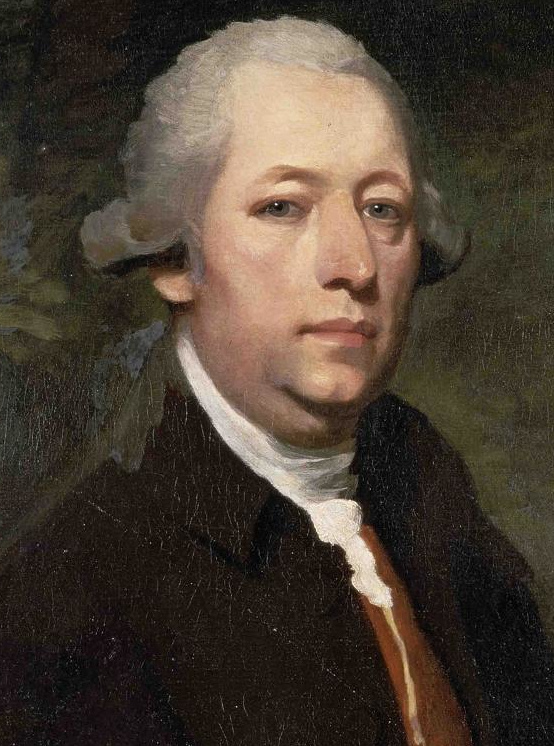
- Born: 1 January 1738; London, England
- Died: 16 November 1812 (aged 74); Teddington, Middlesex, England
- Education: Merchant Taylors' School
- Spouse: Frances Landen (m. 1759)
- Children: 6, including John
- Relatives: Margot Asquith (great-great-granddaughter); Harriet Walter (great-great-great-great-granddaughter)

John Walter (1 January 1738 – 16 November 1812) was an English newspaper publisher and founder of The Times newspaper, which he launched on 1 January 1785 as The Daily Universal Register. He was born in London and educated at Merchant Taylors' School, then located in London.

== Biography ==
Walter was engaged in a prosperous business as a coal merchant from the death of his father Richard Walter (about 1755/6) until 1781. Walter played a leading part in establishing the Coal Exchange in London; but shortly after 1781, when he began to occupy himself solely as an underwriter and became a member of Lloyd's, he over-speculated and failed.

In 1782, he bought from one Henry Johnson a patent for a new method of printing from logotypes (i.e. founts of words or portions of words, instead of letters), and made some improvements to it. In 1784, he acquired an old printing office in Blackfriars, which formed the nucleus of the Printing-house Square of a later date, and established there his Logographic Office.

At first Walter only undertook the printing of books, but on 1 January 1785 he started a small newspaper called The Daily Universal Register, which on reaching its 940th number on 1 January 1788 was renamed The Times.

The printing business developed and prospered, but the newspaper at first had a somewhat chequered career. On 11 July 1789, Walter was convicted of libel on the Duke of York and was sentenced to a fine of £50 (equivalent to £7,000 in 2025), a year's imprisonment in Newgate, to stand in the pillory for an hour and to give surety for good behaviour for seven years; for further libels the fine was increased by £100 and the imprisonment by a second year. On 9 March 1791, however, he was freed and pardoned on the request of the Prince of Wales.

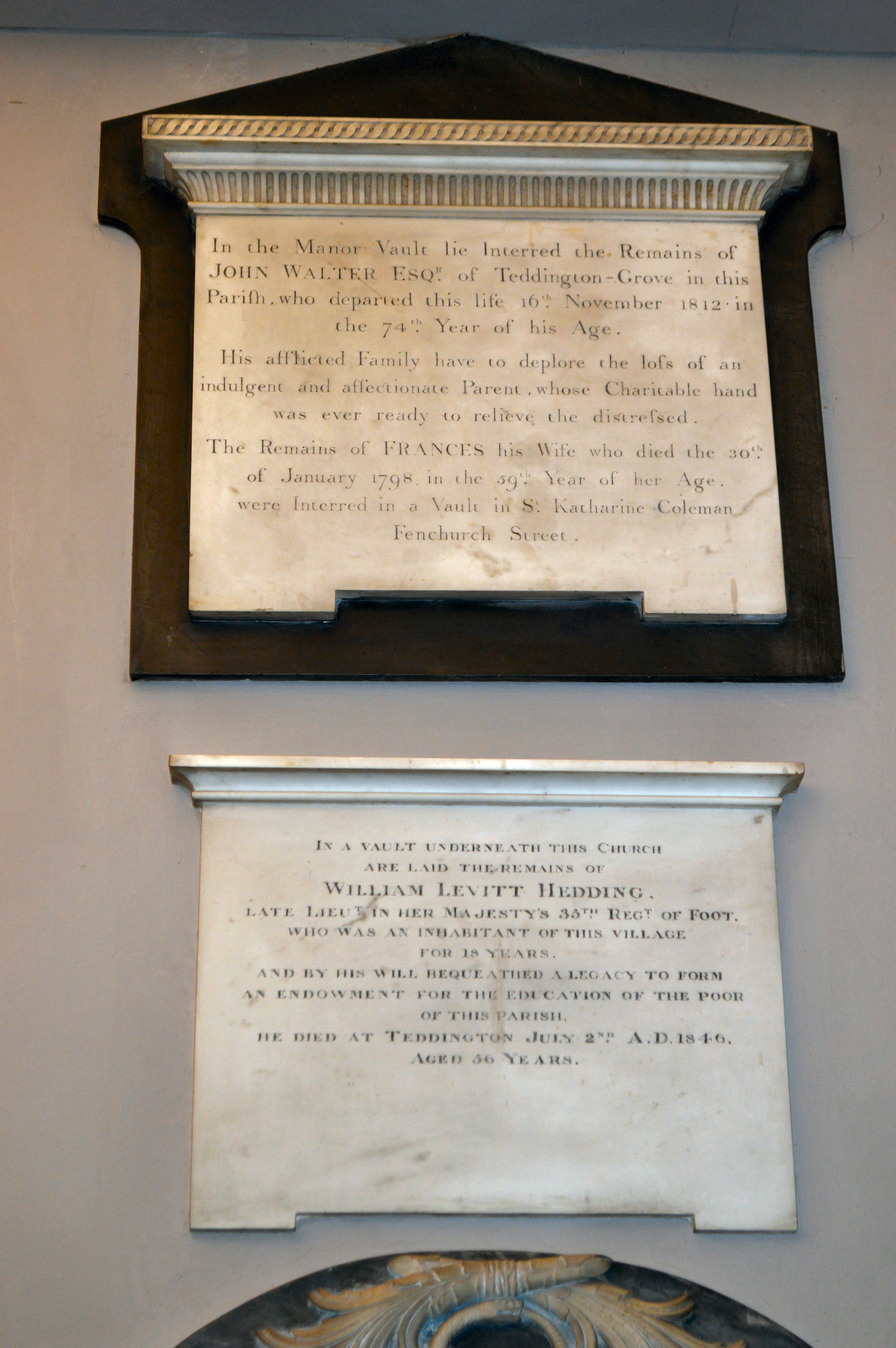
Memorial at St Mary's Church

In 1799, Walter was again convicted for a technical libel, this time on Lord Cowper. He had then given up the management of the business to his eldest son, William, and had (1795) retired to The Grove,Teddington, where he lived until his death, aged 74. He is buried at St Mary with St Alban where there is a memorial.

In 1759, he married Frances Landen (died 1798), by whom he had six children. He very soon gave up the duties he undertook in 1795, and in 1803 transferred the sole management of the business to his son John Walter (editor, born 1776).

He had a natural son, Walter Wilson.
