= George Earle Buckle =

English editor and biographer

- Born: 10 June 1854; Twerton, Somerset, England
- Died: 13 March 1935 (aged 80); Chelsea, London, England
- Education: Winchester College; New College, Oxford
- Occupation(s): Editor and author
- Spouses: Alicia Isobel Payn (m. 1885; died 1898) Beatrice Anne Earle (m. 1905)
- Children: 2
- Relatives: James Payn (father-in-law)

George Earle Buckle (10 June 1854 – 13 March 1935) was an English editor and biographer.

== Early life ==
Buckle was the son of George Buckle, canon of Wells Cathedral, and Mary Hamlyn Earle, the sister of the philologist John Earle. He attended Honiton grammar school and Winchester College before beginning studies at New College, Oxford in 1873. There he won the Newdigate Prize in 1875 and received a first class in both literae humaniores and modern history. From 1877 until 1885, he was a Fellow of All Souls College.

While reading in the chambers of John Rigby, Buckle began receiving offers from the world of journalism. Though he declined the assistant editorship of the Manchester Guardian, a few months before being called to the bar by Lincoln's Inn in 1880 he accepted John Walter's offer to join the editorial staff of The Times. When the editor, Thomas Chenery died in 1884, Buckle, then only 29, was named as his successor, having already assumed most of the position's duties during Chenery's final illness.

== Editor of The Times ==
As editor, Buckle did little to alter either the appearance or the policies of the paper. No longer "the Thunderer" of old, its employees endeavoured to present the news irrespective of bias or interest. By now the staff saw themselves as a collective body serving the public interest, a sense preserved by its ongoing editorial practice of supporting whichever government was in power at the time. The paper's purchase and publication of Richard Piggott's forged letters purportedly showing a connection between Irish Parliamentary Party leader Charles Stewart Parnell and the Phoenix Park murders was primarily motivated by the desire for a scoop rather than because of politics, and Buckle's subsequent offer of his resignation was rejected by Walter.

In the years that followed, Buckle's control over the day-to-day operations of The Times declined due to administrative reorganisation, as authority was gradually decentralised within the paper. Buckle's own duties were reduced slowly to matters of editorial control and the writing of the leading article. When Lord Northcliffe purchased the paper in 1908, he pressed forward with modernisation measures which Buckle had long resisted. The death of the managing director, Charles Frederic Moberly Bell, three years later eliminated the last check on the owner, and Northcliffe forced Buckle's resignation on 31 July 1911.

== Literary career ==
A few months after his departure from The Times, Buckle was approached by the trustees of the estate of Benjamin Disraeli about continuing work on a multi-volume biography of the former prime minister, work on which had been halted by the death of the initial author, William Flavelle Monypenny. Buckle accepted, spending the next eight years writing the final four volumes (of six) of the Life of Benjamin Disraeli. After its completion in 1920, he was asked to take on another ongoing project, the editing of Queen Victoria's letters. Accepting after some hesitation, he performed the task with discretion, ultimately editing six volumes covering Victoria's letters from 1861 until her death. Buckle's final project was organising a multi-volume history of The Times, the first volume of which was published before he died in 1935.

== Personal life ==
Buckle married twice. His first marriage, in 1885, was to Alicia Isobel, the third daughter of the novelist James Payn; their union produced two children. After Alicia's death, Buckle married his first cousin Beatrice Anne, the second daughter of John Earle, in 1905.

Media offices
Preceded by Thomas Chenery	Editor of The Times; 1884–1911	Succeeded by Geoffrey Dawson
