= Arthur Fraser Walter =

English newspaper proprietor

Arthur Fraser Walter (12 September 1846 – 10 August 1910) was an English newspaper owner and publisher, chief proprietor of The Times from 1894 until 1908.

== Early life ==
Born on 12 September 1846, Walter was the second son of John Walter, the third of the name to edit The Times since it was established in 1785. He was educated at Eton and Christ Church, Oxford (1866–1869), where he played for the Oxford University Cricket Club. In 1870 he entered Lincoln's Inn to study law, and in 1874 was called to the bar as a barrister, but never practised. On 28 July 1847, the second John Walter, Arthur's grandfather, died, and his father the third John Walter succeeded to the management of The Times.

== Career ==
Arthur Walter made agreements with American firms to sell the Encyclopædia Britannica and was also responsible for establishing the Times Book Club.

Walter's father died on 3 November 1894 and he became the new chief proprietor of The Times. He remained so until 1908, when the newspaper was converted into a company, and he was the first chairman of the board of directors of the company that bought the newspaper.

Walter was also a Lieutenant Colonel of Volunteers, a Director of the London & Southwestern Railway, High Steward of Wokingham, and a member of the Travellers' and Union Clubs.

== Private life ==
On 15 October 1872, Walter married Henrietta Maria Anson, eldest daughter of Rev. Thomas Anchitel Anson.

Walter died on 10 August 1910.

He was succeeded as chairman of the board of directors of The Times by his son, John Walter V.

His great-granddaughter is the actress Harriet Walter.
