= Printing House Square =

Former square in the City of London

Coordinates: 51°30′45″N 0°06′09″W

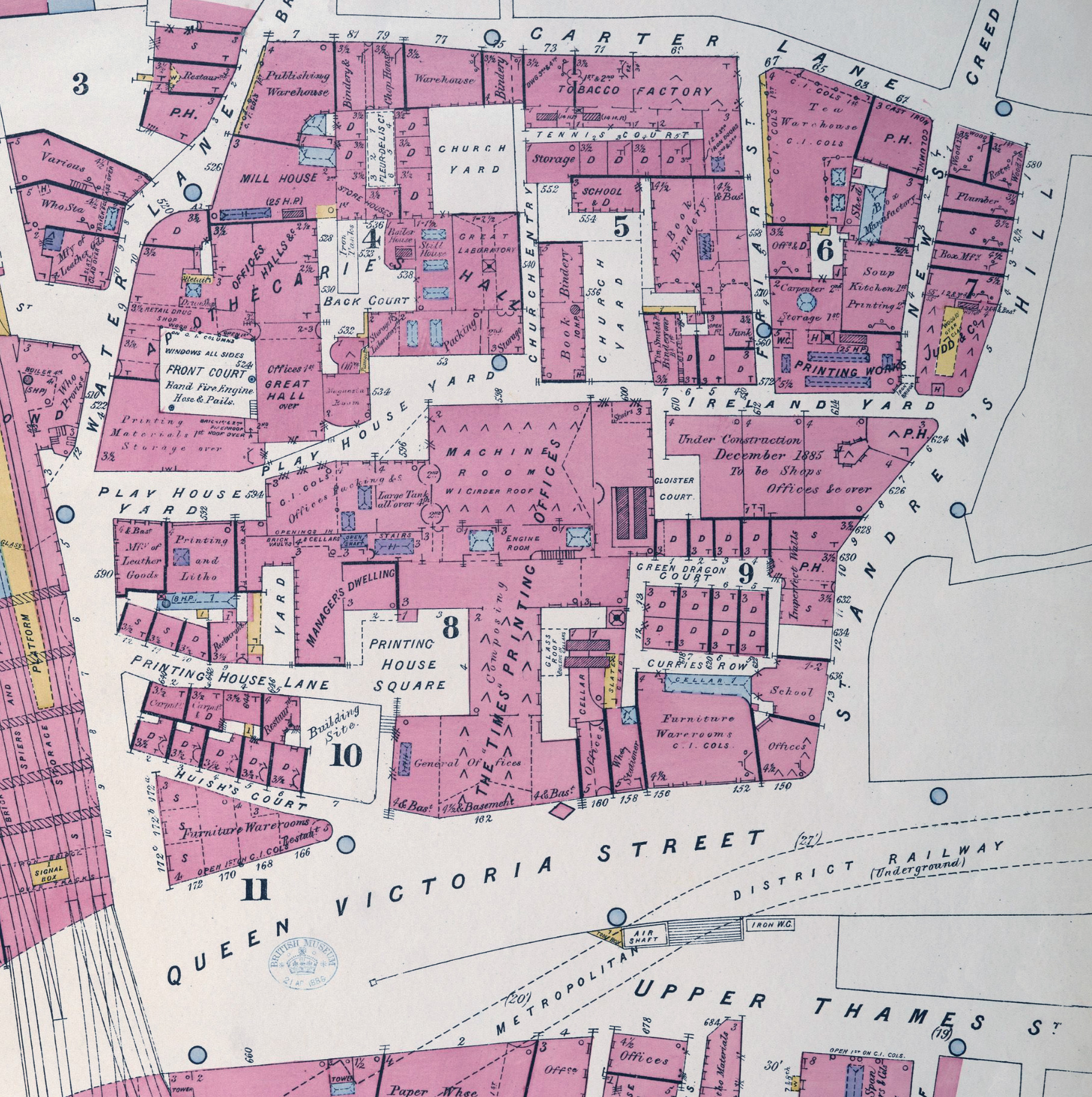
Printing House Square in 1886

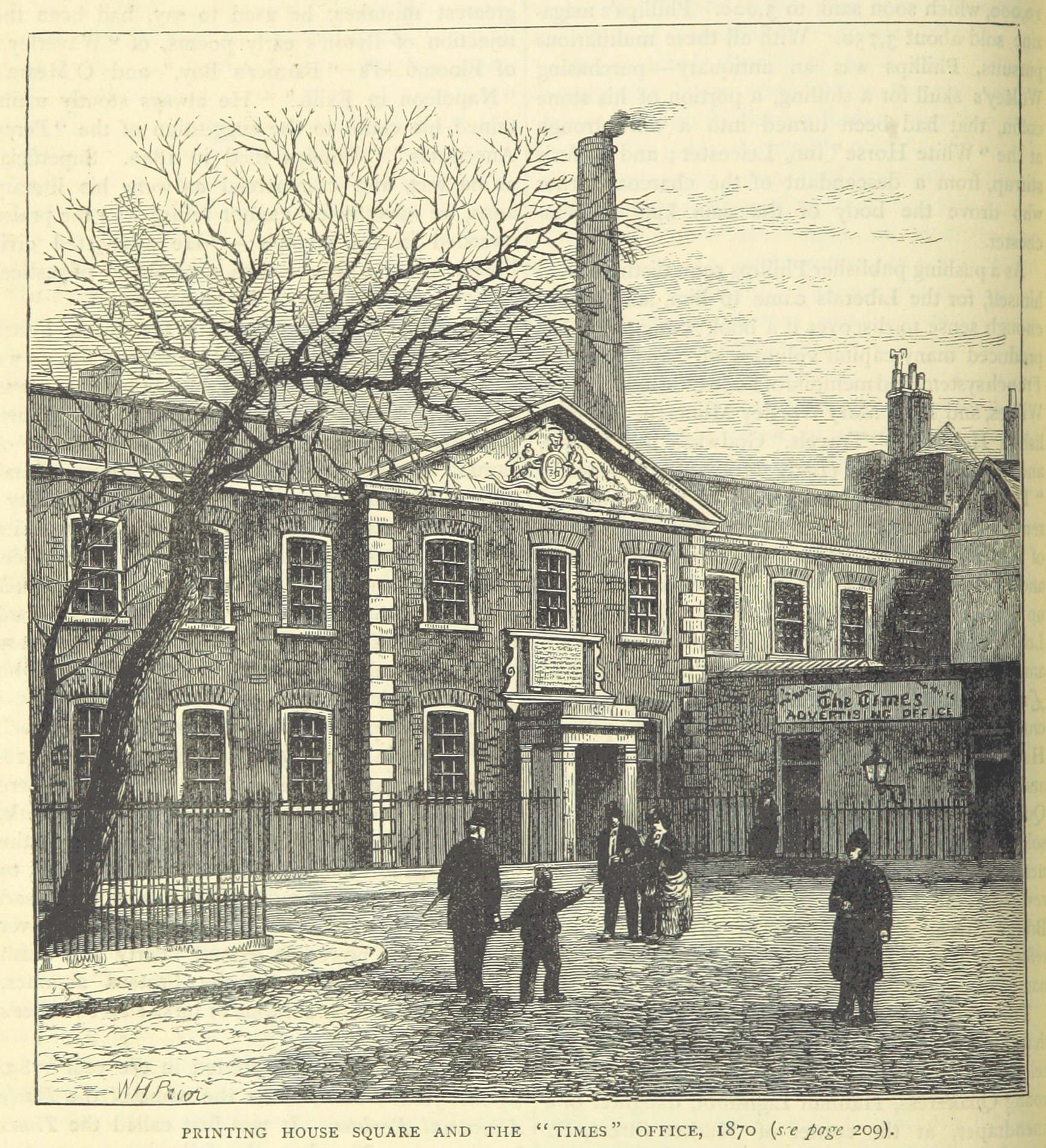
Printing House Square and the Times Office, 1870

Printing House Square was a London court in the City of London, so called from the former office of the King's Printer which occupied the site. For many years, the office of The Times stood on the site, until it relocated to Gray's Inn Road and later to Wapping. The site has been completely redeveloped.
