= The Times =

British daily national newspaper

- Front page, 19 October 2015
- Type: Daily newspaper
- Format: Compact
- Owner: News UK
- Editor: Tony Gallagher
- Founded: 1 January 1785; 241 years ago (as The Daily Universal Register)
- Headquarters: The News Building, 1 London Bridge Place, London
- Country: United Kingdom
- Circulation: 365,880 (as of March 2020)
- Readership: 740,000 (digital and physical subscribers)
- Sister newspapers: The Sunday Times
- ISSN: 0140-0460
- OCLC number: 61565875
- Website: thetimes.com

The Times is a British daily national newspaper based in London. It began in 1785 under the title The Daily Universal Register, adopting its modern name on 1 January 1788. The Times and its sister paper, The Sunday Times (founded in 1821), are published by Times Media, since 1981 a subsidiary of News UK, in turn wholly owned by News Corp. The Times and The Sunday Times were founded independently and have had common ownership since 1966. It is considered a newspaper of record in the UK.

The Times was the first newspaper to bear that name, inspiring numerous other papers around the world. In countries where these other titles are popular, it has been referred to as The London Times or The Times of London, although the newspaper is of national scope and distribution.

The Times had an average daily circulation of 365,880 in March 2020; in the same period, The Sunday Times had an average weekly circulation of 647,622. They also have 640,000 digital-only paid subscribers as of June 2025, with the number rising to 740,000 when including physical circulation paid subscribers. In the year June 2024 to June 2025, Times Media, the parent company of The Times and Sunday Times newspapers saw pre-tax profits rise +13% to £69.2 million ($92.7 million), operating profits of £73.3 million ($102.2 million) and revenues rising +2% to £390.7 million ($523.5 million). An American edition of The Times has been published since 6 June 2006 with it mainly being circulated in the New York City and Washington, D.C. metro areas. A complete historical file of the digitised paper, up to 2024, is available online from Gale Cengage Learning. The Times and The Sunday Times launched their own radio station, Times Radio, in 2020; its shows cover news and politics, both nationally and internationally, and had an average weekly reach of 604,000 listeners at the end of 2024.

== History ==
=== 1785 to 1890 ===
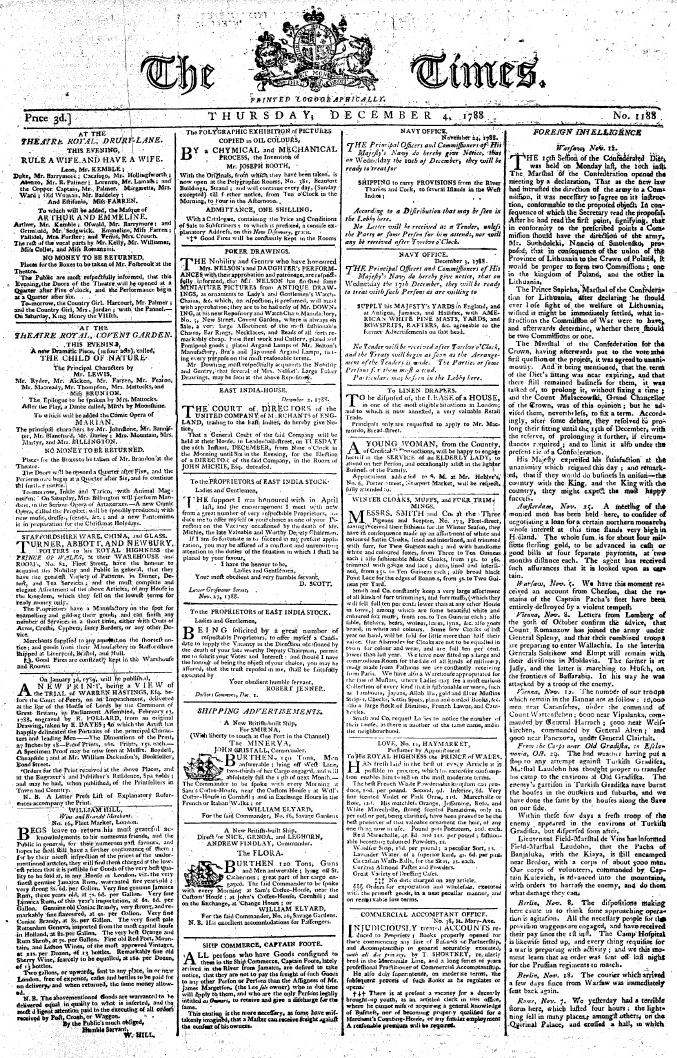
Front page of The Times from 4 December 1788

The Times was founded by John Walter (1738–1812) on 1 January 1785 as The Daily Universal Register, with Walter in the role of editor. Walter had lost his job by the end of 1784 after the insurance company for which he worked went bankrupt due to losses from a Jamaican hurricane. Unemployed, Walter began a new business venture. At that time, Henry Johnson invented logography, a typesetting system that promised to be faster and more accurate by including sorts for common words and groups of letters (although three years later, it was proved less efficient than advertised); Walter bought the patent and opened a printing house to produce books by this method. The first publication of The Daily Universal Register was on 1 January 1785. Walter changed the title after 940 editions on 1 January 1788 to The Times. In 1803 Walter handed ownership and editorship to his son John. The senior Walter's pioneering efforts to obtain continental news, especially from France, helped to build the paper's reputation among policymakers and financiers, in spite of a sixteen-month incarceration in Newgate Prison for libels printed in The Times.

The Times used contributions from significant figures in the fields of politics, science, literature, and the arts to build its reputation. For much of its early life, the profits of The Times were very large and the competition minimal, so it could pay far better than its rivals for information or writers. Beginning in 1814, the paper was printed on the new steam-driven cylinder press developed by Friedrich Koenig (1774–1833). In 1815, The Times had a circulation of 5,000. It had grown to 9,800 by 1837 and was 51,200 in 1854.

Thomas Barnes was appointed general editor in 1817. In the same year, the paper's printer, James Lawson, died and passed the business onto his son, John Joseph Lawson (1802–1852). Under the editorship of Barnes and his successor in 1841, John Thadeus Delane, the influence of The Times rose to great heights, especially in politics and amongst the City of London. Peter Fraser and Edward Sterling were two noted journalists, and gained for The Times the pompous/satirical nickname 'The Thunderer' (from "We thundered out the other day an article on social and political reform"). The increased circulation and influence of the paper were based in part to its early adoption of the steam-driven rotary printing press. Distribution via steam trains to rapidly growing concentrations of urban populations helped ensure the profitability of the paper and its growing influence.

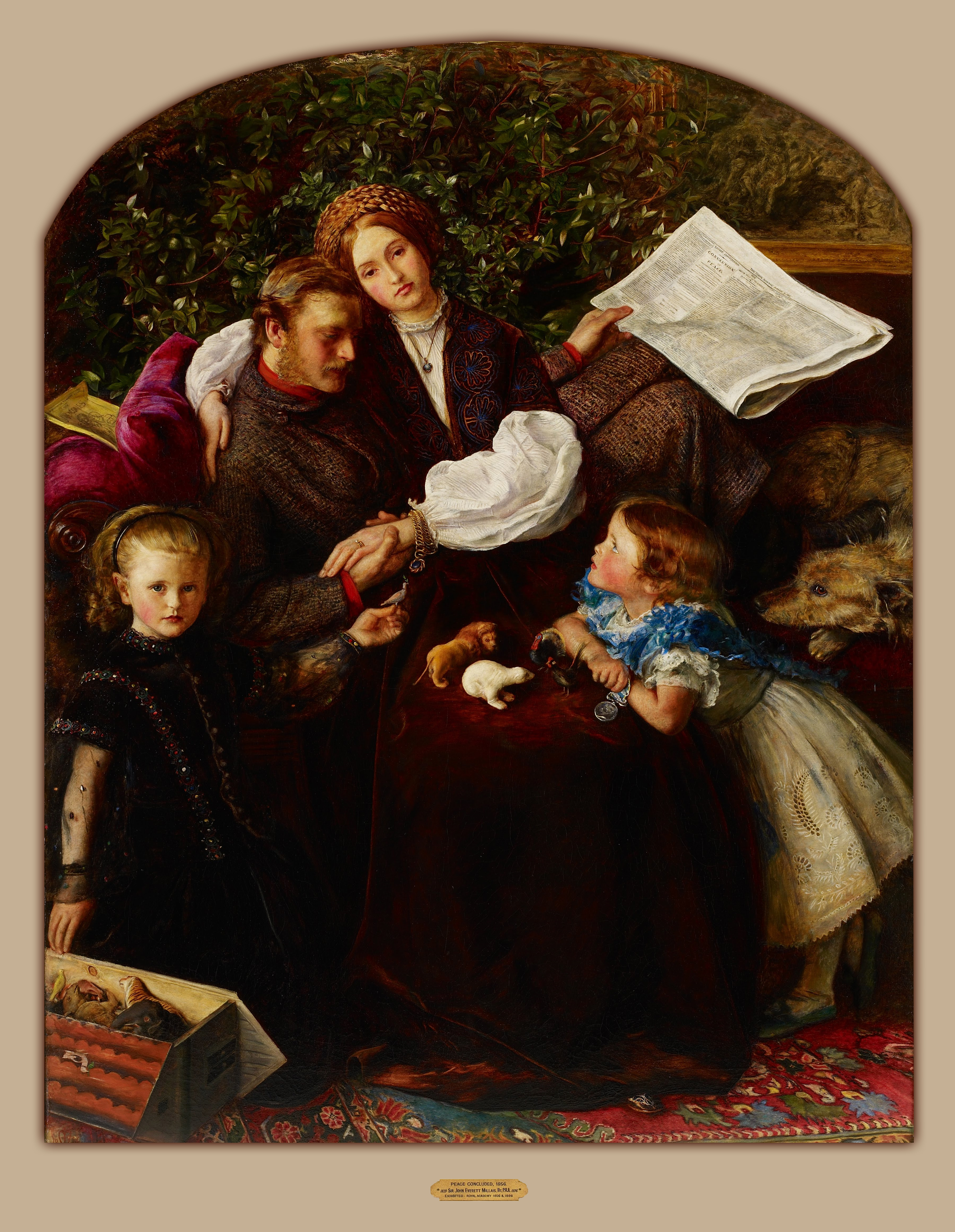
A wounded British officer reading The Times's report of the end of the Crimean War, in John Everett Millais' painting Peace Concluded

The Times was one of the first newspapers to send war correspondents to cover particular conflicts. William Howard Russell, the paper's correspondent with the army in the Crimean War, was immensely influential with his dispatches back to England.

=== 1890 to 1981 ===
The Times faced financial failure in 1890 under Arthur Fraser Walter, but it was rescued by an energetic editor, Charles Frederic Moberly Bell. During his tenure (1890–1911), The Times became associated with selling the Encyclopædia Britannica using aggressive American marketing methods introduced by Horace Everett Hooper and his advertising executive, Henry Haxton. Due to legal fights between the Britannica's two owners, Hooper and Walter Montgomery Jackson, The Times severed its connection in 1908 and was bought by the pioneering newspaper magnate Alfred Harmsworth (later Lord Northcliffe).

In editorials published on 29 and 31 July 1914, Wickham Steed, the Times's Chief Editor, argued that the British Empire should enter the Great War. On 8 May 1920, also under the editorship of Steed, The Times, in an editorial, endorsed the antisemitic fabrication The Protocols of the Learned Elders of Zion as a genuine document, and called Jews the world's greatest danger. In the leader entitled "The Jewish Peril, a Disturbing Pamphlet: Call for Inquiry", Steed wrote about The Protocols of the Elders of Zion:

"What are these 'Protocols'? Are they authentic? If so, what malevolent assembly concocted these plans and gloated over their exposition? Are they forgery? If so, whence comes the uncanny note of prophecy, prophecy in part fulfilled, in part so far gone in the way of fulfillment?"

The following year, when Philip Graves, The Times' correspondent for Constantinople (modern Istanbul), exposed The Protocols as a forgery, The Times retracted the editorial of the previous year.

In 1922 John Jacob Astor, son of the 1st Viscount Astor, bought The Times from the Northcliffe estate. The paper gained a measure of notoriety in the 1930s with its advocacy of German appeasement; the editor Geoffrey Dawson was closely allied with government supporters of appeasement, most notably Neville Chamberlain. Candid news reports by Norman Ebbut from Berlin that warned of Nazi warmongering were rewritten in London to support the appeasement policy.

Kim Philby, a double agent with primary allegiance to the Soviet Union, was a correspondent for the newspaper in Spain during the Spanish Civil War of the late 1930s. Philby was admired for his courage in obtaining high-quality reporting from the front lines of the bloody conflict. He later joined British Military Intelligence (MI6) during the Second World War, was promoted into senior positions after the war ended, and defected to the Soviet Union when discovery was inevitable in 1963.

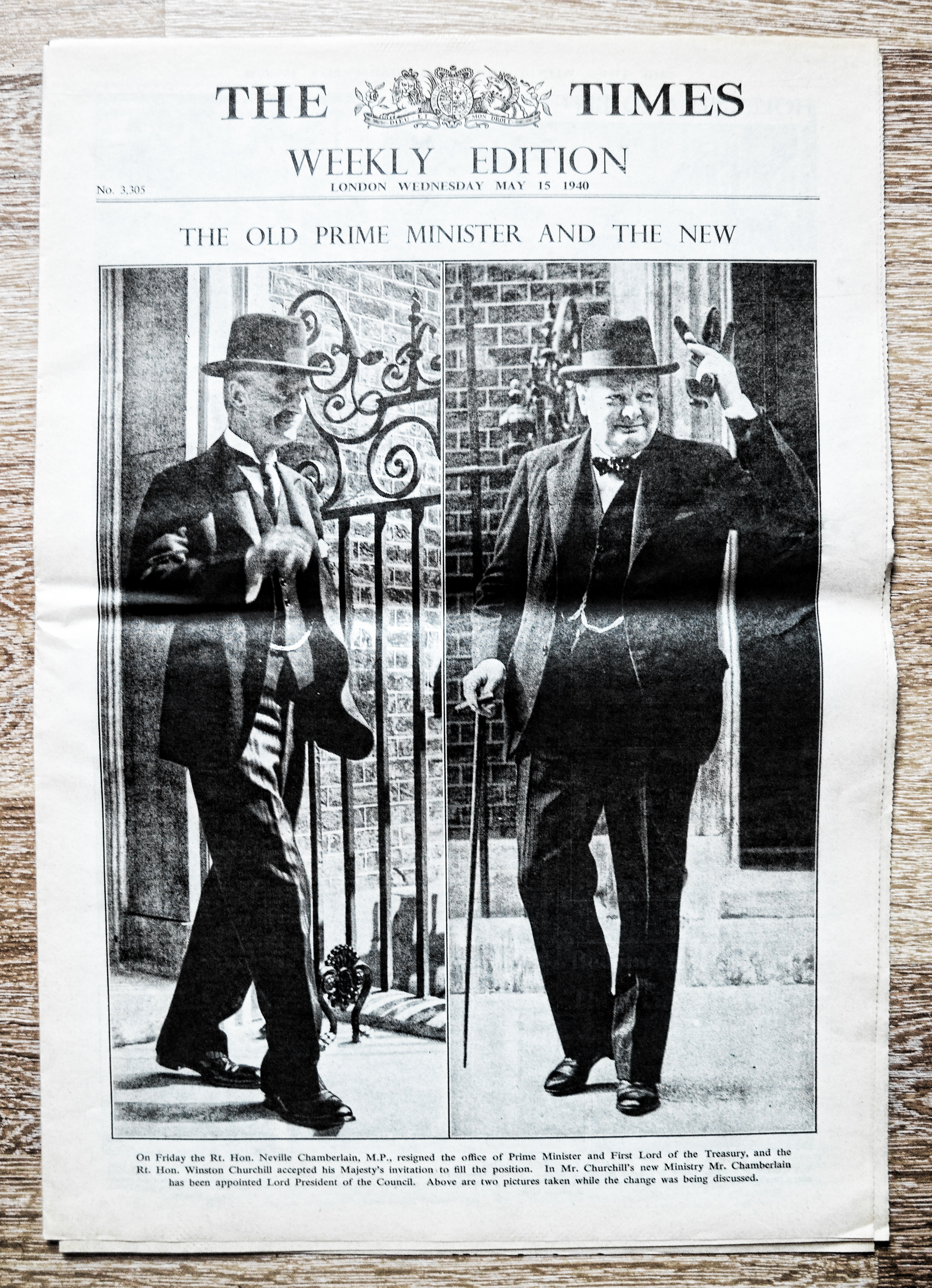
Frontpage weekly magazine The Times, 15 May 1940, with headline: "The old prime minister and the new".

Between 1941 and 1946, the left-wing British historian E. H. Carr was assistant editor. Carr was well known for the strongly pro-Soviet tone of his editorials. In December 1944, when fighting broke out in Athens between the Greek Communist ELAS and the British Army, Carr in a Times leader sided with the Communists, leading Winston Churchill to condemn him and the article in a speech to the House of Commons. As a result of Carr's editorial, The Times became popularly known during that stage of the Second World War as "the threepenny Daily Worker" (the price of the Communist Party's Daily Worker being one penny).

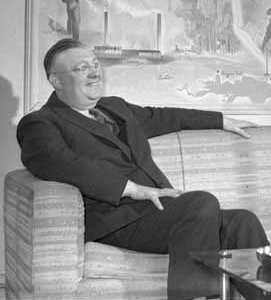
Roy Thomson

On 3 May 1966 it resumed printing news on the front page; previously, the front page had been given over to small advertisements, usually of interest to the moneyed classes in British society. Also in 1966, the Royal Arms, which had been a feature of the newspaper's masthead since its inception, was abandoned. In the same year, members of the Astor family sold the paper to the Canadian publishing magnate Roy Thomson. His Thomson Corporation brought it under the same ownership as The Sunday Times to form Times Newspapers Limited.

An industrial dispute prompted the management to shut down the paper for nearly a year, from 1 December 1978 to 12 November 1979.

The Thomson Corporation management was struggling to run the business due to the 1979 energy crisis and union demands. Management sought a buyer who was in a position to guarantee the survival of both titles, had the resources, and was committed to funding the introduction of modern printing methods.

Several suitors appeared, including Robert Maxwell, Tiny Rowland and Lord Rothermere; however, only one buyer was in a position to meet the full Thomson remit: the Australian business magnate Rupert Murdoch. Robert Holmes à Court, another Australian magnate, had previously tried to buy The Times in 1980.

=== From 1981 ===
In 1981 The Times and The Sunday Times were bought from Thomson by Murdoch's News International. The acquisition followed three weeks of intensive bargaining with the unions by the company negotiators John Collier and Bill O'Neill. Murdoch gave legal undertakings to maintain separate journalism resources for the two titles. The Royal Arms were reintroduced to the masthead at about this time, but whereas previously it had been that of the reigning monarch, it would now be that of the House of Hanover, who were on the throne when the newspaper was founded.

After 14 years as editor, William Rees-Mogg resigned upon completion of the change of ownership. Murdoch began to make his mark on the paper by appointing Harold Evans as his replacement. One of his most important changes was the introduction of new technology and efficiency measures. Between March 1981 and May 1982, following agreement with print unions, the hot-metal Linotype printing process used to print The Times since the 19th century was phased out and replaced by computer input and photocomposition. The Times and the Sunday Times were able to reduce their print room staff by half as a result. However, direct input of text by journalists ("single-stroke" input) was still not achieved, and this was to remain an interim measure until the Wapping dispute of 1986, when The Times moved from New Printing House Square in Gray's Inn Road (near Fleet Street) to new offices in Wapping.

Robert Fisk, seven times British International Journalist of the Year, resigned as foreign correspondent in 1988 over what he saw as "political censorship" of his article on the shooting down of Iran Air Flight 655 in July 1988. He wrote in detail about his reasons for resigning from the paper due to meddling with his stories, and the paper's pro-Israel stance.

In June 1990 The Times ceased its policy of using courtesy titles ("Mr", "Mrs" or "Miss" prefixes) for living persons before full names on the first reference, but it continues to use them before surnames on subsequent references. In 1992 it accepted the use of "Ms" for unmarried women "if they express a preference."

In November 2003 News International began producing the newspaper in both broadsheet and tabloid sizes. Over the next year, the broadsheet edition was withdrawn from Northern Ireland, Scotland and the English West Country. Since 1 November 2004 the paper has been printed solely in tabloid format.

On 6 June 2005 The Times redesigned its Letters page, dropping the practice of printing correspondents' full postal addresses. Published letters were long regarded as one of the paper's key constituents. According to its leading article "From Our Own Correspondents", the reason for the removal of full postal addresses was to fit more letters onto the page.

In a 2007 meeting with the House of Lords Select Committee on Communications, which was investigating media ownership and the news, Murdoch stated that the law and the independent board prevented him from exercising editorial control.

In May 2008 printing of The Times switched from Wapping to new plants at Waltham Cross in Hertfordshire, and Merseyside and Glasgow, enabling the paper to be produced with full colour on every page for the first time.

On 26 July 2012, to coincide with the official start of the London 2012 Olympics and the issuing of a series of souvenir front covers, The Times added the suffix "of London" to its masthead.

In March 2016 the paper dropped its rolling digital coverage for a series of "editions" of the paper at 9am, midday, and 5pm on weekdays. The change also saw a redesign of the paper's app for smartphones and tablets.

In April 2018 the Independent Press Standards Organisation (IPSO) upheld a complaint against The Times for its report of a court hearing in a Tower Hamlets fostering case.

In April 2019 culture secretary Jeremy Wright said he was minded to allow a request by News UK to relax the legal undertakings given in 1981 to maintain separate journalism resources for The Times and The Sunday Times.

In 2019 IPSO upheld complaints against The Times over their article "GPS data shows container visited trafficking hotspot", and for three articles as part of a series on pollution in Britain's waterways: "No river safe for bathing", "Filthy Business" and "Behind the story". IPSO also upheld complaints in 2019 against articles headlined "Funding secret of scientists against hunt trophy ban," and "Britons lose out to rush of foreign medical students."

In 2019 The Times published an article about Imam Abdullah Patel that wrongly claimed Patel had blamed Israel for the 2003 murder of a British police officer by a terror suspect in Manchester. The story also wrongly claimed that Patel ran a primary school that had been criticised by Ofsted for segregating parents at events, which Ofsted said was contrary to "British democratic principles". The Times settled Patel's defamation claim by issuing an apology and offering to pay damages and legal costs. Patel's solicitor, Zillur Rahman, said the case "highlights the shocking level of journalism to which the Muslim community are often subject".

In 2019 The Times published an article titled "Female Circumcision is like clipping a nail, claimed speaker". The article featured a photo of Sultan Choudhury beside the headline, leading some readers to incorrectly infer that Choudhury had made the comment. Choudhury lodged a complaint with IPSO and sued The Times for libel. In 2020 The Times issued an apology, amended its article, and agreed to pay Choudhury damages and legal costs. Choudhury's solicitor, Nishtar Saleem, said, "This is another example of irresponsible journalism. Publishing sensational excerpts on a 'free site' while concealing the full article behind a paywall is a dangerous game".

In December 2020 the human rights advocacy group Cage and Moazzam Begg, a former prisoner at Guantanamo Bay detention camp, received damages of £30,000 plus costs in a libel case they had brought against The Times. In June 2020 a report in The Times suggested that Cage and Begg were supporting a man who had been arrested in relation to a knife attack in Reading, Berkshire, in which three men were murdered. The Times report also suggested that Cage and Begg were excusing the actions of the accused man by mentioning mistakes made by the police and others. In addition to paying damages, The Times printed an apology. Cage stated that the damages amount would be used to "expose state-sponsored Islamophobia and those complicit with it in the press. ... The Murdoch press empire has actively supported xenophobic elements and undermined principles of open society and accountability. ... We will continue to shine a light on war criminals and torture apologists and press barons who fan the flames of hate".

The Times was forced to correct a false article in January 2025 about electric vehicle (EV) sales, following successful complaint to IPSO.

On 28 October 2025 The Times published an article falsely claiming to feature quotes from the former mayor of New York City Bill de Blasio regarding the mayoral candidate Zohran Mamdani; the article was deleted two hours after publication. The actual interviewee was later revealed to be Bill DeBlasio, a wine importer living in Huntington Station, New York. DeBlasio used ChatGPT to generate a response to the reporter's initial email, and received an interview through his home's Ring doorbell. On 30 October The Nation magazine published an article by the former mayor de Blasio about the incident, stating that he gave the reporter some credit for apologising to him directly, but expressing concern about the state of journalism "in a hyper-partisan era when standards of objectivity and decency are decaying week by week".

==== Amnesty International report ====
In May 2026, a report by Amnesty International found that The Times – along with other major dailies, The Daily Telegraph, The Guardian, and The Sun – had significantly amplified the British anti-transgender movement. Coverage from late-2010s onwards became increasingly negative, depicting transgender people as "involved in controversy, demanding or aggressive and with a propensity to be offended", their analysis found. According to Amnesty's research, transgender voices were largely absent from the reporting, while the impact of anti-trans figures and groups was magnified. The report concludes that a concerted, years-long campaign was waged to influence the media, in order to manufacture anti-transgender sentiment.

== Content ==
The Times features news for the first half of the paper; the Opinion/Comment section begins after the first news section, with world news normally following this. The Register, which contains obituaries, a Court & Social section, and related material, follows the business pages on the centre spread. The sports section is at the end of the main paper.

=== Times2 ===
The Times' main supplement, every day, is times2, featuring various columns. It was discontinued in early March 2010, but reintroduced on 12 October 2010 after the discontinuation was poorly received. Its regular features include a puzzles section called Mind Games. Its previous incarnation began on 5 September 2005, before which it was called T2 and previously Times 2. The supplement contains arts and lifestyle features, television and radio listings, and theatre reviews. The Times employs Richard Morrison as its classical music critic.

=== The Game ===
The Game is included in the newspaper on Mondays, and details all the weekend's football activity (Premier League and Football League Championship, League One and League Two.) The Scottish edition of The Game also includes results and analysis from Scottish Premier League games. During the FIFA World Cup and UEFA European Championship, there is a daily supplement of The Game.

=== Saturday supplements ===
The Saturday edition of The Times contains a variety of supplements.

Beginning on 5 July 2003 (issue 67807) and ending after 17 January 2009 (issue 69535), Saturday issues of The Times came with a weekly magazine called TheKnowledge containing listings for the upcoming week, from that Saturday to the next Friday, compiled by PA Arts & Leisure (part of Press Association Ltd). Its taglines/coverlines include: "Your pocket guide to what's on in London", "The World's Greatest City, Cut Down To Size", and "Your critical guide to the cultural week". It has been described as "a weekly entertainment guide to what to see and what to miss".

These supplements were relaunched on 24 January 2009 as: Sport, Saturday Review (arts, books, TV listings and ideas), Weekend (including travel and lifestyle features), Playlist (an entertainment listings guide), and The Times Magazine (columns on various topics).

==== The Times Magazine ====
The Times Magazine features columns touching on various subjects such as celebrities, fashion and beauty, food and drink, homes and gardens, or simply writers' anecdotes. Notable contributors include Giles Coren, Food and Drink Writer of the Year in 2005 and Nadiya Hussain, winner of The Great British Bake Off.

=== Online presence ===
The Times and The Sunday Times have had an online presence since 1996, originally at the-times.co.uk and sunday-times.co.uk, and later at timesonline.co.uk and thetimes.co.uk. Both papers are now hosted on thetimes.com. There are also iOS and Android editions of both newspapers available in the same app, The Times: UK & World News. Both papers are also hosted in the Classic app, a purpose-built tablet-only application. Since July 2010 News UK has required readers who do not subscribe to the print edition to pay £2 per week to read The Times and The Sunday Times online.

Visits to the websites decreased by 87% after the paywall was introduced in October 2010, from 21 million unique users per month to 2.7 million one month later. In November 2024, thetimes.com site had a readership of 103 million. In October 2011, there were around 111,000 subscribers to The Times' digital products, which increased to 600,000 digital subscribers by September 2024. A Reuters Institute survey in 2024 ranked The Times as having the ninth highest trust rating out of 15 different outlets polled.

The Times Digital Archive is available by subscription.

The Wikipedia community considers The Times and The Sunday Times to be generally reliable sources.

== Ownership ==
The Times has had the following eight owners since its foundation in 1785:

- 1785 to 1803: John Walter
- 1803 to 1847: John Walter, 2nd
- 1847 to 1894: John Walter III
- 1894 to 1908: Arthur Fraser Walter
- 1908 to 1922: Lord Northcliffe
- 1922 to 1966: Astor family
- 1966 to 1981: Roy Thomson and the International Thomson Organization
- 1981 to present: News UK (formerly News International, a wholly owned subsidiary of News Corp, run by Rupert Murdoch)
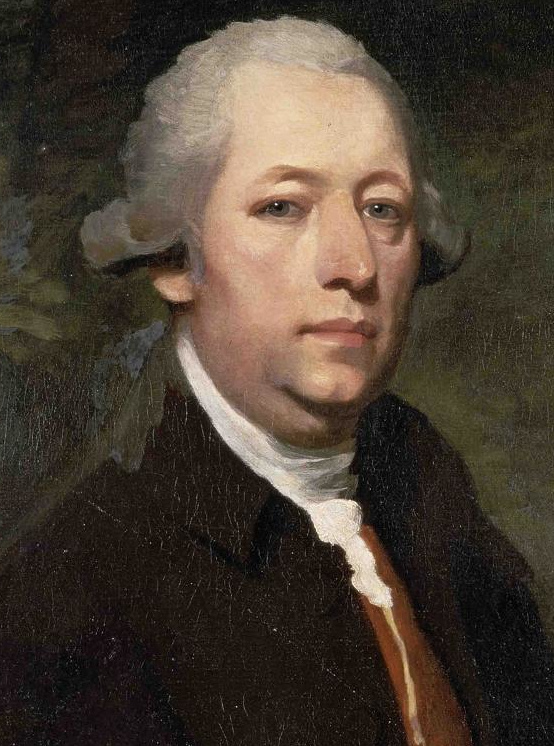
John Walter, the founder of The Times

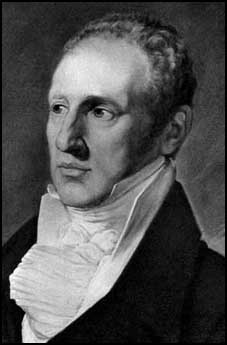
John Walter II

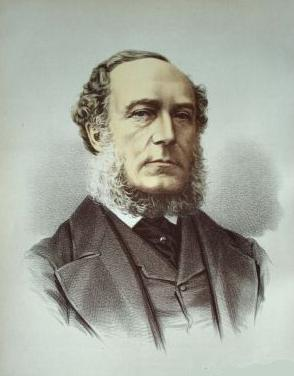
John Walter III

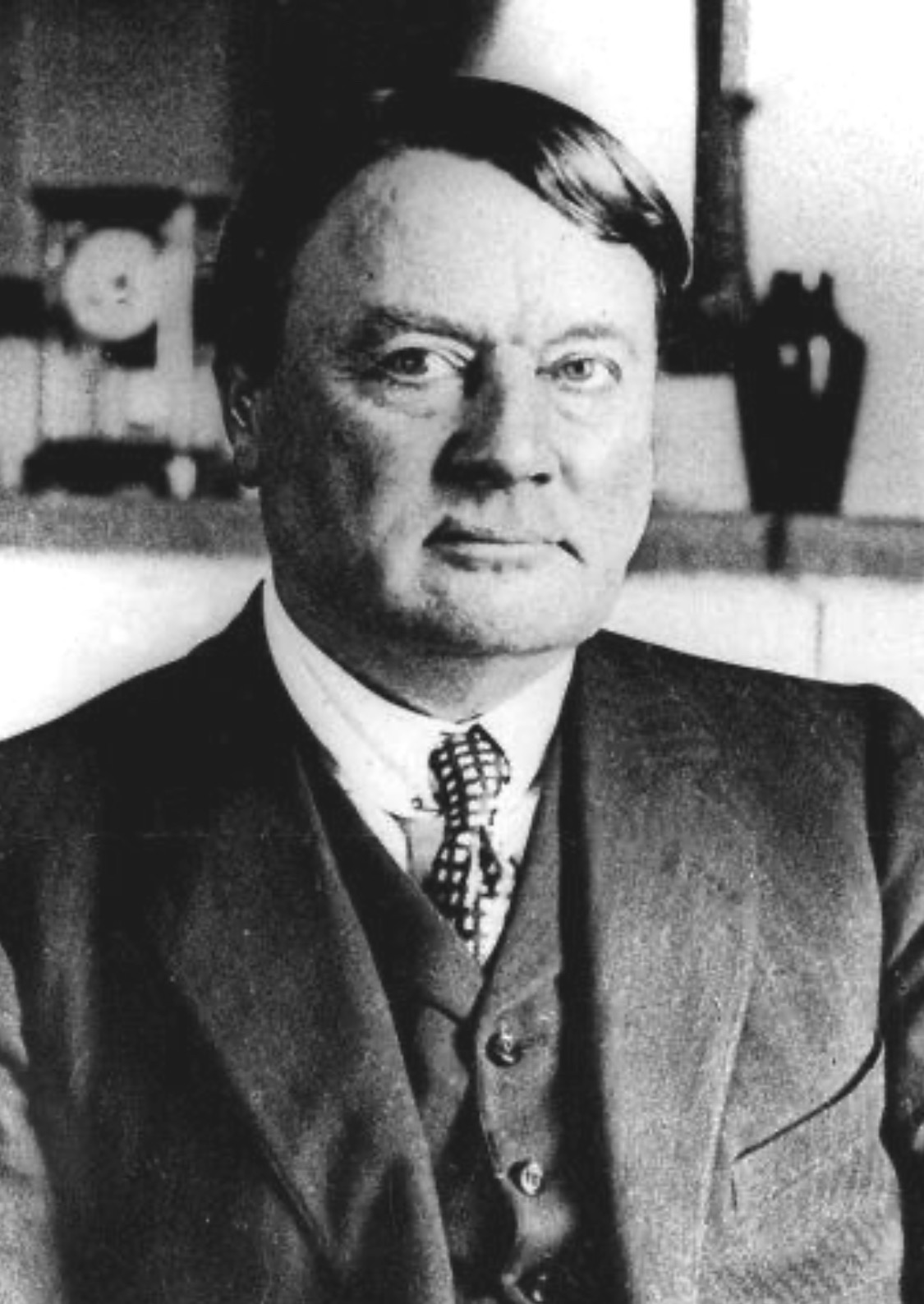
Lord Northcliffe

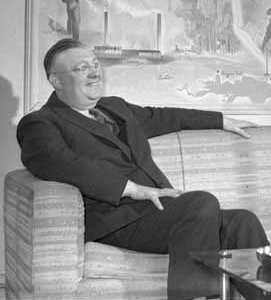
Roy Thomson

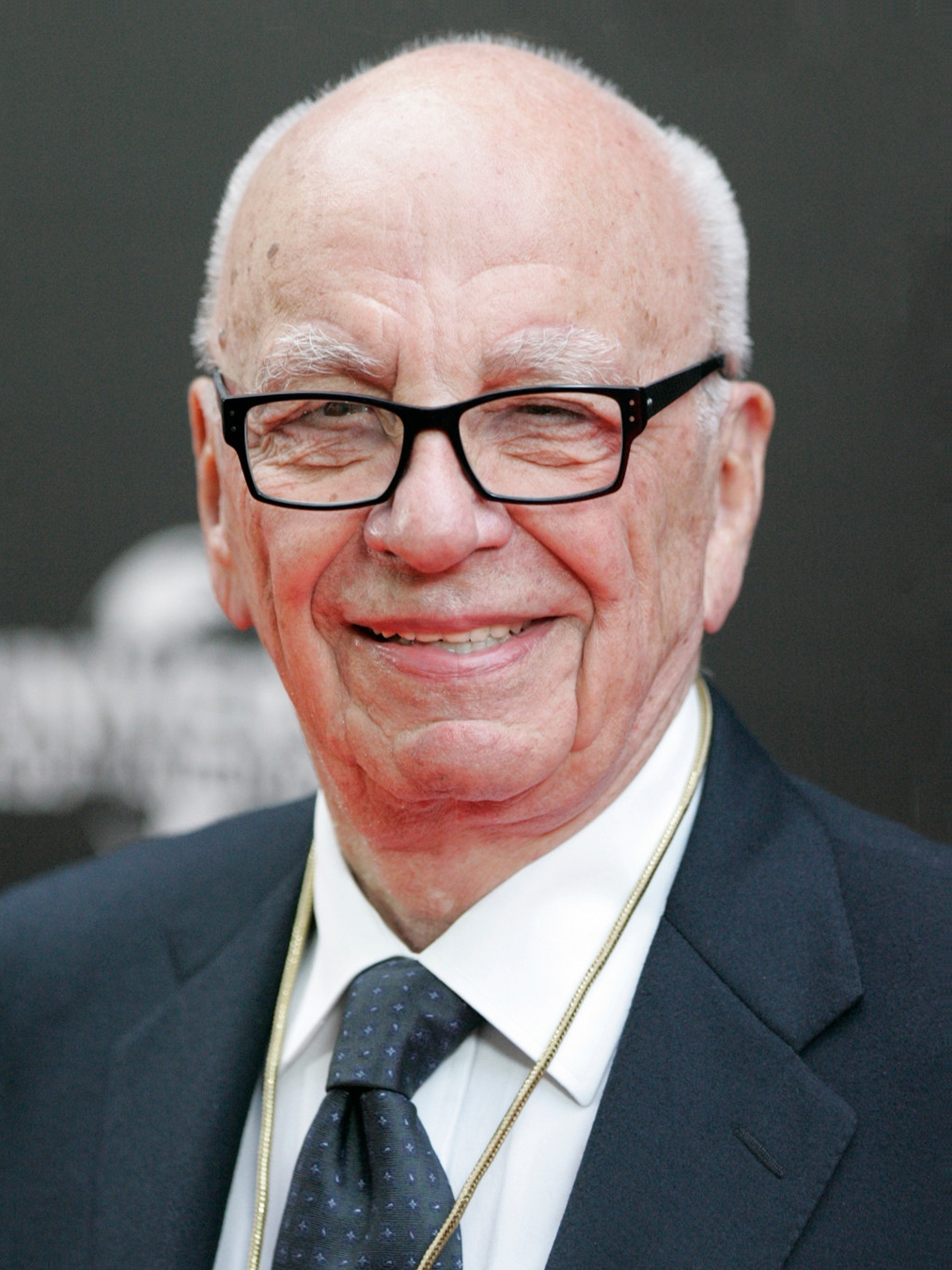
Rupert Murdoch

== Readership ==
The Times had a circulation of 70,405 on 5 September 1870, due to a reduction in price and the Franco-Prussian War. The Times had a circulation of 150,000 in March 1914, due to a reduction in price. The Times had a circulation of 248,338 in 1958, a circulation of 408,300 in 1968, and a circulation of 295,863 in 1978. At the time of Harold Evans' appointment as editor in 1981, The Times had an average daily sale of 282,000 copies in comparison to the 1.4 million daily sales of its traditional rival, The Daily Telegraph. By 1988, The Times had a circulation of 443,462. By November 2005 The Times sold an average of 691,283 copies per day, the second-highest of any British "quality" newspaper (after The Daily Telegraph, which had a circulation of 903,405 copies in the period), and the highest in terms of full-rate sales. By March 2014 average daily circulation of The Times had fallen to 394,448 copies, compared to The Daily Telegraph's 523,048, with the two retaining respectively the second-highest and highest circulations among British "quality" newspapers. In contrast, The Sun, the highest-selling "tabloid" daily newspaper in the United Kingdom, sold an average of 2,069,809 copies in March 2014, and the Daily Mail, the highest-selling "middle market" British daily newspaper, sold an average of 1,708,006 copies in the same period.

The Sunday Times has significantly higher circulation than The Times, and sometimes outsells The Sunday Telegraph. In January 2019, The Times had a circulation of 417,298 and The Sunday Times 712,291.

In a 2009 national readership survey, The Times was found to have the highest number of ABC1 25–44 readers and the largest number of readers in London of any of the "quality" papers.

== Typeface ==
The Times is the originator of the widely used Times New Roman typeface, originally developed by Stanley Morison of The Times in collaboration with Monotype Imaging for its legibility in low-tech printing. In November 2006, The Times began printing headlines in a new typeface, Times Modern. The Times was printed in broadsheet format for 219 years, but switched to compact size in 2004 in an attempt to appeal more to younger readers and commuters using public transport. The Sunday Times remains a broadsheet.

The... typeface – The Times New Roman – debuted on October 3, 1932... The design was exclusively available to The Times for one year, and then made available to other customers on October 3, 1933. (Documented in a few places, but the reference I have in front of me is The Monotype Recorder vol. XXXI, no. 247, from September–October 1932. Complicating matters, this was misprinted as being vol. XXI, no. 246.)

This is the big one: the previous face was not known as Times Old Roman. Jeez. Just think about it: why would something be known as "old" whatever before there was a new version? In fact – and this is documented in Printing in the Twentieth Century (published by The Times), The Monotype Recorder, and elsewhere – the various typefaces used before the introduction (The) Times New Roman [sic] didn't really have a formal name.

They were a suite of types originally made by Miller and Co. (later Miller & Richards) in Edinburgh around 1813, generally referred to as "modern". When The Times began using Monotype (and other hot-metal machines) in 1908, this design was remade by Monotype for its equipment. As near as I can tell, it looks like Monotype Series no. 1 – Modern (which was based on a Miller & Richards typeface) – was what was used up until 1932.

— Dan Rhatigan, type director

An example of the Times New Roman typeface

The Times started using the Monotype Modern typeface in 1908.

The Times commissioned the serif typeface Times New Roman, created by Victor Lardent at the English branch of Monotype, in 1931. It was commissioned after Stanley Morison had written an article criticising The Times for being badly printed and typographically antiquated. Victor Lardent, an artist from The Times' advertising department, created the typeface under Morison's supervision. Morison used an older typeface named Plantin as the basis for his design but made revisions for legibility and economy of space. Times New Roman made its debut in the issue of 3 October 1932. After one year, the design was released for commercial sale. The Times stayed with Times New Roman for 40 years, but new production techniques and the format change from broadsheet to tabloid in 2004 have caused the newspaper to switch typeface five times since 1972. However, all the new typeface have been variants of the original New Roman type:

- Times Europa was designed by Walter Tracy in 1972 for The Times, as a sturdier alternative to the Times font family, designed for the demands of faster printing presses and cheaper paper. The typeface features more open counter spaces.
- Times Roman replaced Times Europa on 30 August 1982.
- Times Millennium was made in 1991, drawn by Gunnlaugur Briem on the instructions of Aurobind Patel, composing manager of News International.
- Times Classic first appeared in 2001. Designed as an economical face by the British type team of Dave Farey and Richard Dawson, it took advantage of the new PC-based publishing system at the newspaper while obviating the production shortcomings of its predecessor, Times Millennium. The new typeface included 120 letters per font. Initially, the family comprised ten fonts, but a condensed version was added in 2004.
- Times Modern was unveiled on 20 November 2006, as the successor of Times Classic. Designed for improving legibility in smaller font sizes, it uses 45-degree angled bracket serifs. Ben Preston, the deputy editor of The Times, and the designer Neville Brody led Research Studios in creating the custom typeface, which remains wholly owned by The Times.

== Political alignment ==
Historically, the paper was not overtly pro-Tory or Whig, but has been a bastion of the British Establishment and the British Empire. In 1959 the historian of journalism Allan Nevins analysed the importance of The Times in shaping the views of events of London's elite, writing:

"For much more than a century The Times has been an integral and important part of the political structure of Great Britain. Its news and its editorial comment have in general been carefully coordinated, and have at most times been handled with an earnest sense of responsibility. While the paper has admitted some trivia to its columns, its whole emphasis has been on important public affairs treated with an eye to the best interests of Britain. To guide this treatment, the editors have for long periods been in close touch with 10 Downing Street."

The Times adopted a stance described as "peculiarly detached" at the 1945 UK general election; although it was increasingly critical of the Conservative Party's campaign, it did not advocate a vote for any one party. However, the newspaper reverted to the Conservatives at the next election, in 1950. It supported the Conservatives for the subsequent three elections, followed by support for both the Conservatives and the Liberal Party for the next five elections, expressly supporting a Conservative–Liberal coalition in 1974. It then backed the Conservatives solidly until 1997, when it declined to make any party endorsement but supported individual (primarily Eurosceptic) candidates.

For the 2001 general election, The Times declared its support for Tony Blair's Labour government, which was returned to government in a landslide (although not as large as in 1997). It supported Labour again in 2005, when Labour achieved a third successive win, albeit with a reduced majority. In 2004, according to MORI, the voting intentions of The Times' readership were 40% for the Conservatives, 29% for the Liberal Democrats, and 26% for the Labour Party. For the 2010 general election, The Times declared its support for the Conservatives once again; the election ended with the Conservatives taking the most votes and seats but having to form a coalition with the Liberal Democrats in order to form a government as they had failed to gain an overall majority.

Its changes in political alignment make The Times the most varied newspaper in terms of political support in British history. Some columnists in The Times are connected to the Conservative Party, such as Daniel Finkelstein, Tim Montgomerie, Matthew Parris and Matt Ridley, but there are also columnists connected to the Labour Party, such as David Aaronovitch and Jenni Russell.

The Times occasionally makes endorsements of foreign political candidates. In November 2012 it endorsed a second term for Barack Obama as President of the United States in the 2012 US presidential election, although it also expressed reservations about his foreign policy.

During the 2019 Conservative leadership election, The Times endorsed Boris Johnson and subsequently endorsed the Conservatives in the general election of that year.

In 2022 Tony Gallagher was appointed to replace John Witherow, who had served nine years as editor. A former editor of The Sun, Gallagher enthusiastically backed Brexit during the 2016 EU referendum. According to The Guardian, "The Times' readership is split politically, with journalists at the outlet speculating on how Gallagher will shape the paper's editorial line as the prospect of a Labour government became more likely (in 2024)."

The Times did not endorse any political party at the 2024 general election. In its leader article, it stated that Labour "cannot expect an endorsement" as it had "yet to earn the trust of the British people" and had been "sparing with the truth about what it will do in office".

== Sponsorships ==
The Times, along with the British Film Institute, sponsored the BFI London Film Festival from 2003 to 2009. It also sponsors the Cheltenham Literature Festival and the Asia House Festival of Asian Literature at Asia House, London.

== Editors ==
- John Walter 1785 to 1803
- John Walter, Jnr 1803 to 1812
- Sir John Stoddart 1812 to 1816
- Thomas Barnes 1817 to 1841
- John Thadeus Delane 1841 to 1877
- Thomas Chenery 1877 to 1884
- George Earle Buckle 1884 to 1912
- George Geoffrey Dawson 1912 to 1919
- George Sydney Freeman 1919 (two-month 'inter-regnum')
- Henry Wickham Steed 1919 to 1922
- George Geoffrey Dawson1923 to 1941
- Robert McGowan Barrington-Ward 1941 to 1948
- William Francis Casey 1948 to 1952
- Sir William John Haley 1952 to 1966
- William Rees-Mogg 1967 to 1981
- Harold Evans 1981 to 1982
- Charles Douglas-Home 1982 to 1985
- Charles Wilson 1985 to 1990
- Simon Jenkins 1990 to 1992
- Peter Stothard 1992 to 2002
- Robert Thomson 2002 to 2007
- James Harding 2007 to 2012
- John Witherow 2013 to 2022
- Tony Gallagher 2022 to date

== Related publications ==
An Irish digital edition of the paper was launched in September 2015 at TheTimes.ie. A print edition was launched in June 2017, replacing the international edition previously distributed in Ireland. The Irish edition was set to close in June 2019 with the loss of 20 jobs.

The Times Literary Supplement (TLS) first appeared in 1902 as a supplement to The Times, becoming a separately paid-for weekly literature and society magazine in 1914. The TLS is owned and published by News International and co-operates closely with The Times, with its online version hosted on The Times website, and its editorial offices based in 1 London Bridge Street, London.

Between 1951 and 1966, The Times published a separately paid-for quarterly science review, The Times Science Review. The Times started a new, free, monthly science magazine, Eureka, in October 2009. The magazine closed in October 2012.

The Times Review of Industry (began in 1947) and Technology (began in 1957) merged in March 1963 to become The Times Review of Industry & Technology. From 1952 The Times Review of Industry included the London and Cambridge Economic Bulletin.

Times Atlases have been produced since 1895. The Collins Bartholomew imprint of HarperCollins Publishers is currently responsible for producing them. The flagship product is The Times Comprehensive Atlas of the World.

In 1971 The Times began publishing the Times Higher Education Supplement (now known as the Times Higher Education) which focuses its coverage on tertiary education.

The Times launched Stories of Our Times, a flagship daily narrative news podcast, in March 2020 to broaden its digital audio portfolio. The show, which offers in-depth investigative reporting on current affairs, politics, and world events, is hosted alternately by journalists Manveen Rana and David Aaronovitch. A new episode is released every weekday.

The newspaper produces a number of specialized audio series in addition to its main current affairs program. These include weekly briefings on business, culture, and politics, as well as The Game, a football-focused podcast that provides sports journalism and match analysis.

== Historical value ==
In 1915, R. P. Farley said "the files of The Times must be constantly studied" as an authority for the political and social history of the English people during the period from the Reform Bill 1832 to the Elementary Education Act 1870 (1832–1870). From 1971 to 1973, John Joseph Bagley said The Times is "valuable" as a source of nineteenth-century English history and that the annual index to The Times is useful for the twentieth century. In 2003 Richard Krzys said The Times is very reliable as a source of history. In 2016 Denise Bates said The Times is "indispensable" as a source for historical events of national importance.

In 2019 James Oldham said The Times is an important source for nisi prius trials. In 2015 Johnston and Plummer said that The Times is an important source for music reviews.

== In popular culture ==
In the dystopian future world of George Orwell's Nineteen Eighty-Four, The Times has been transformed into an organ of the totalitarian ruling party. The book's lead character, Winston Smith, is employed to rewrite past issues for the Ministry of Truth.

Rex Stout's fictional detective Nero Wolfe is described as fond of solving The Times' crossword puzzle at his New York home, in preference to those of American papers.

In the James Bond series by Ian Fleming, James Bond reads The Times. As described by Fleming in From Russia, with Love, The Times was "the only paper that Bond ever read."

== See also ==
- History of journalism in the United Kingdom
- List of the oldest newspapers
