= Cressy =

Cressy can refer to:

== Places ==
- Cressy, Tasmania, Australia, a town
  - Electoral district of Cressy, a former electoral district of the Tasmanian House of Assembly
- Cressy, Victoria, Australia, a town
- Cressy, Seine-Maritime, a commune in France
- Cressy, Switzerland, a village in the municipality of Bernex, Switzerland
- Cressy, California, former name of Cressey, California, United States, a census-designated place

== Ships ==
- HMS Cressy, the name of four Royal Navy ships
- Cressy class cruiser, a class of Royal Navy armoured cruisers
- Cressy (ship), a passenger ship to New Zealand in 1850
- Cressy, a narrowboat belonging to L. T. C. Rolt, credited with starting the restoration movement for English canals with the publication of Narrow Boat (1944)

== People ==
- Cressy (surname)

== Events ==
- Battle of Cressy, alternative rendering of the Battle of Crécy, one of the most significant battles of the Hundred Years' War

== See also ==
- Cressey (disambiguation)
- Crecy (disambiguation)
- Cressy by Bret Harte
