= Thomas D'Oylie =

English physician and spanish scholar

Thomas D'Oylie, or D'Oyly (c. 1548 – 1603), was a leading English physician and Spanish scholar of the Elizabethan era.

== Background ==
He was the third son of John D'Oylie of Greenlands House, Hambleden, Buckinghamshire and Chislehampton, Oxfordshire, and his wife Frances Edmondes, daughter of Andrew Edmondes of Cressing Temple, Essex. Her mother was Elizabeth Bledlow (died 1556), who after Andrew's death remarried the Welsh statesman John Williams, 1st Baron Williams of Thame. Frances was a former maid of honour to Elizabeth I, and was frequently at Court in her later years. The D'Oylies were an ancient Oxfordshire family who claimed to be descended indirectly from the Norman knight Robert D'Oyly (died 1091), who came to England with William the Conqueror.

John D'Oylie died in 1569. His widow remarried Richard Danvers of Calthorpe, Oxfordshire, a cousin of her first husband, and died at a great age in 1601. She was the principal heiress of her brother Sir Christopher Edmondes MP of Lewknor, who died in 1595/6. Described as "the Queen's servant", he was a courtier in good standing.

Thomas's eldest brother Sir Robert D'Oylie, a former High Sheriff of Oxfordshire, was a victim of the still-mysterious mass death called the Black Assize of Oxford 1577, in which at least 300 people died from unknown causes (possibly bubonic plague or gaol fever) in the city of Oxford while the assizes were being held there in July–August 1577. He married Elizabeth Bacon (died 1621), half-sister of Francis Bacon and Anthony Bacon. Elizabeth, who made two further marriages, lived after Robert's death mainly at Greenlands, where she "kept bountiful state".

Robert and Thomas were the uncles of Sir Cope D'Oylie (died 1633), the son of their brother John. Cope's impressive tomb, with its memorials to himself, his wife Martha Quarles and their children, can still be seen in the Church of St. Mary the Virgin, Hambleden.

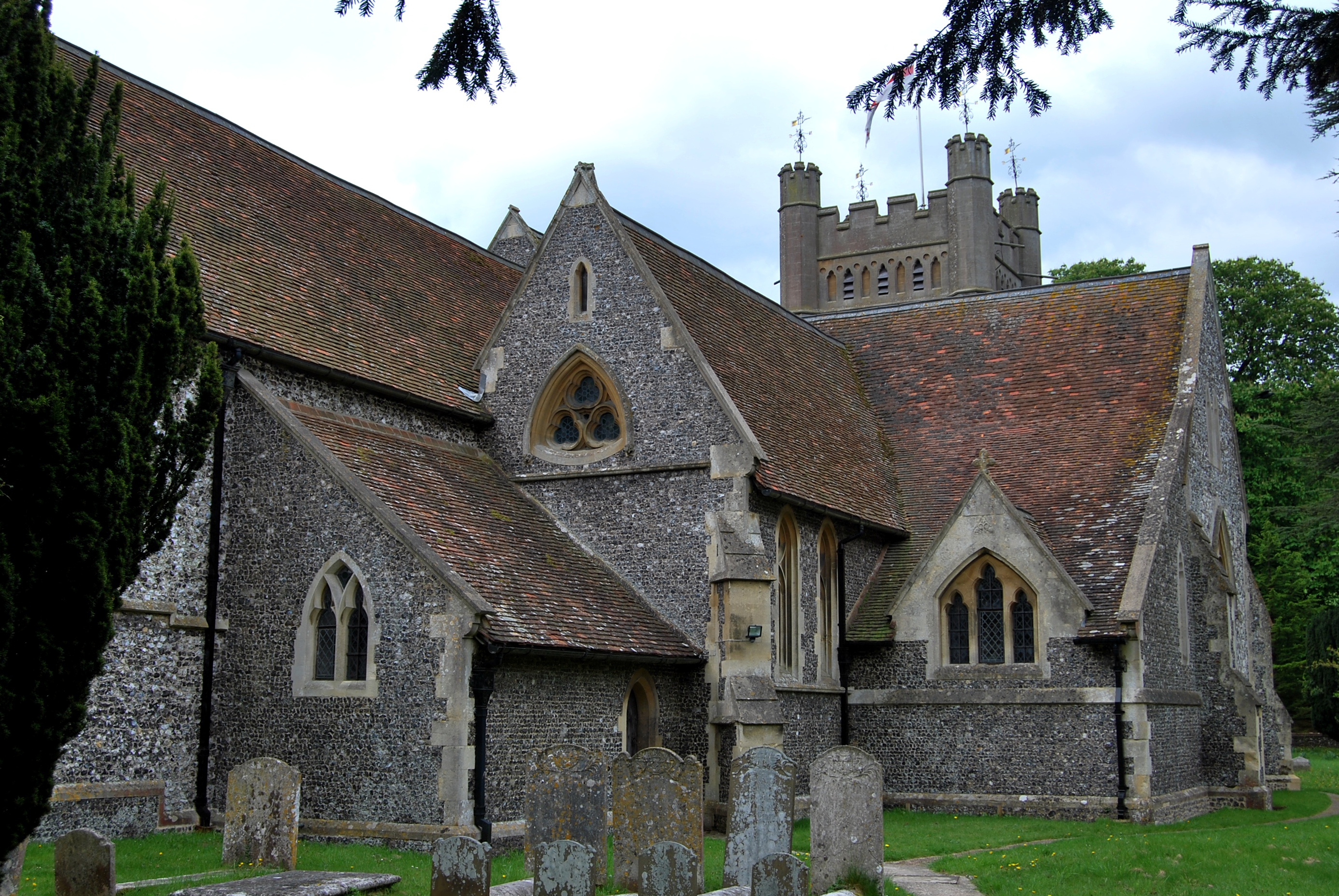
St Mary's Church, Hambleden, where there is a D'Oylie family tomb

== Student ==
He entered Magdalen College, Oxford by 1563, and was awarded his BA degree in 1564, becoming MA in 1569. He failed to gain the degree of Bachelor of Medicine from Oxford in 1571, and resolved to qualify as a physician in a foreign University. He immediately became attached to the entourage of Robert Dudley, 1st Earl of Leicester. A warm friendship sprang up between Thomas and the Bacon brothers, his in-laws. He spent some time in Paris in 1580. He received his medical degree from the University of Basel in 1581 or 1582, served as an army doctor at Antwerp, and was present at the Siege of Oudenaarde in 1582.

== Career ==
He was a spy for Leicester, who was appointed Lord Regent of the Netherlands during the Dutch Revolt. In a humorous letter to Leicester from Calais in 1585, he described having set out by ship from Gravelines, only to be seized and searched at dagger point by "the hell-hounds of Dunkirk", sent by the Governor of Dunkirk to apprehend him (the "Dunkirkers" were pro-Spanish and notorious pirates). However, the "hell-hounds" failed to find the incriminating letters they were looking for, which Thomas had prudently thrown out the porthole. It appears that in 1597, in an ironic twist, his old enemy the Governor of Dunkirk was lodged in his house as a prisoner. In the same year, Thomas accompanied Sir Robert Cecil on a diplomatic mission to Paris.

=== Physician ===
On his return to England from the Netherlands, he settled in London and became a fellow of the Royal College of Physicians in 1588, having been a licentiate since 1585. He received a doctorate from the University of Oxford in 1592, and served as Censor of the College of Physicians three times (his office had nothing to do with censorship: he had the task of upholding academic standards, in particular by means of a notoriously gruelling oral examination). He became a physician at St. Bartholomew's Hospital, and was considered to be an outstanding doctor.

=== Death ===
He died about 16 March 1603 and was buried in the Hospital church, St Bartholomew-the-Less, Smithfield.

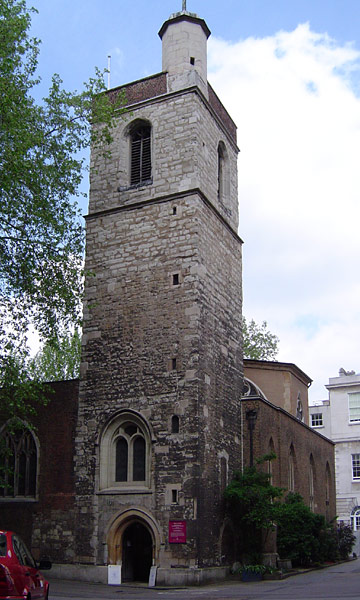
Church of St Bartholomew-the-Less, where D'Oylie is buried

=== Dictionary ===
He was a fine linguist, who was especially fluent in Spanish, and played a large part in the composition of Bibliotheca Hispanica, a Spanish–English–Latin dictionary and grammar. It was first published in 1591, under the sole name of his co-author and fellow Spanish scholar Sir Richard Percivale (also spelt Perceval or Percyvall), and reprinted with additional material in 1599.

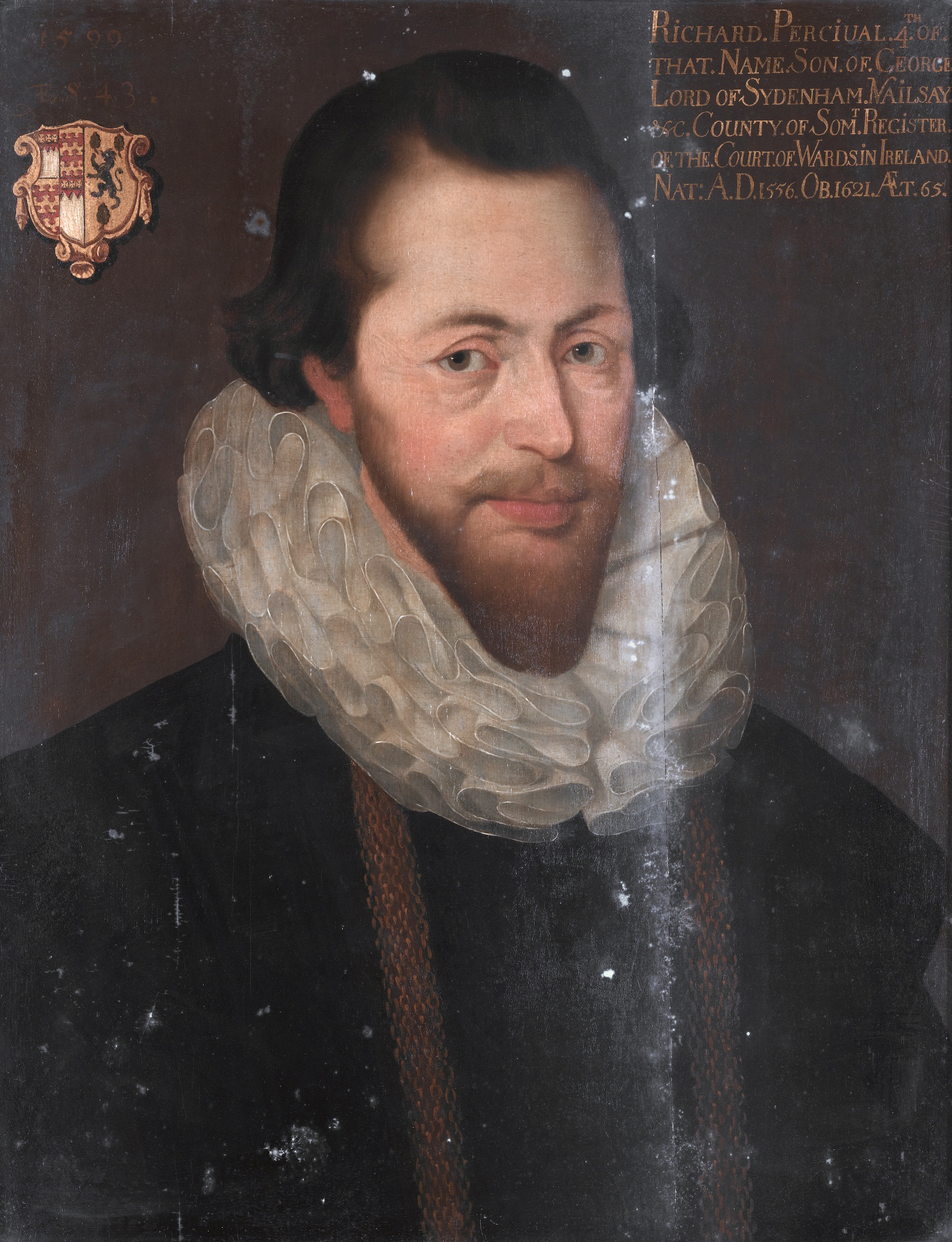
Sir Richard Perceval or Percivale, with whom D'Oylie collaborated on their dictionary "Bibliotheca Hispanica"

== Family ==
Thomas married in 1570 Anne Perrott, daughter of Simon Perott of North Leigh, Oxfordshire (died 1584), fellow of Magdalen College and Proctor of the University of Oxford, and his first wife Elizabeth Love (died 1572), daughter of Edward Love of Aynho, Northamptonshire. Elizabeth was a close relative by marriage of the prominent public servant Sir Thomas Pope, whose sister Alice was her stepmother.

Anne seems to have died between 1598 and 1602. They had three sons, Norris, Michael and Francis (a late child, born in 1597, when his parents had been married almost 30 years), and three daughters, Frances, Katherine and Margery. Margery married the barrister Hugh de Cressy, later a judge in Ireland, and was the mother of the noted Benedictine scholar Serenus de Cressy.

== Sources ==
- Ball, F. Elrington. The Judges in Ireland 1221–1921. John Murray, London (1926, 2 volumes)
- Birch, Thomas and Williams, Robert Folkestone. The Court and times of James I. London, Henry Colburn (1848)
- Stephen, Leslie, ed. (1888). "D'Oylie, Thomas" . Dictionary of National Biography. Vol. 15. London: Smith, Elder & Co.
- MacNamara, F. N. Memorials of the Danvers Family (of Dauntsey and Culworth). London, Hardy and Page (1895)
- Munck, William. "D'Oylie, Thomas". Royal College of Physicians Museum
- Anthony à Wood, Athenae Oxonienses: An Exact History of all the Writers and Bishops who have had their Education in the University of Oxford from 1500 to 1690. Rivington, London (1813)
