= Hugh Cressy =

Hugh Cressy may refer to:

- Serenus de Cressy (c. 1605–1674), English monk
- Hugh Cressy (MP), Member of Parliament (MP) for Nottinghamshire
- Hugh de Cressy (died 1189), Anglo-Norman administrator and nobleman
- Hugh de Cressy (judge) (c. 1570–1643), English-born judge in Ireland
