= Hugh de Cressy (judge) =

Justice of the Irish King's Bench

- Born: c. 1570; Wakefield, West Yorkshire, England, UK
- Died: 1643 (aged 72–73)
- Occupation: Judge
- Spouse: Margery D'Oylie
- Children: Serenus de Cressy

Hugh Cressy, or de Cressy (c. 1570–1643) was an English-born judge in seventeenth-century Ireland. He is best remembered as the father of Serenus de Cressy (born Hugh Paulinus de Cressy), the noted Benedictine scholar and royal chaplain. In his last years, the judge was threatened with impeachment, on the grounds of his supposed leniency towards Irish Catholics.

He came from an old Nottinghamshire family which settled in Yorkshire. He was probably born in Wakefield, and later lived in Thorpe Salvin, where his son was born.

He entered Furnivall's Inn in 1590, proceeded to Lincoln's Inn, and was called to the Bar in 1598. In 1605 he was appointed Reader of Furnivall's Inn, but his first performance as Reader was a disastrous failure "to the great discredit of Lincoln's Inn". The Benchers of Lincoln's Inn were so angry at the humiliation (Furnivall's being affiliated to Lincoln's) that they fined him £10 and expelled him. However, after a number of years, his fault was forgiven: he was readmitted to the Inn, became a Bencher of Lincoln's Inn in 1614, and Treasurer in 1629.

== A Judge in Ireland ==
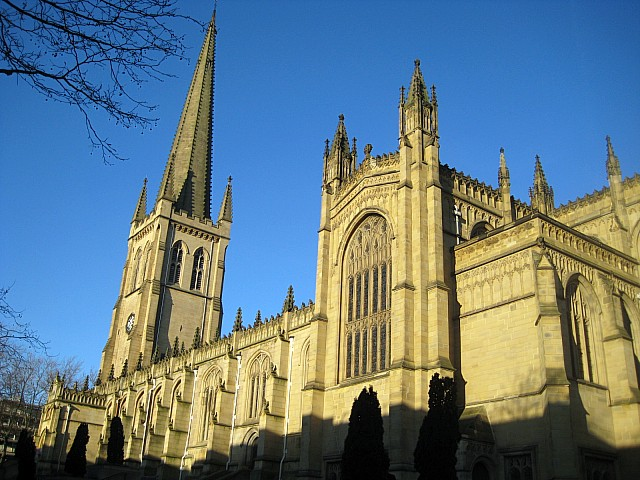
The Cathedral Church, Wakefield

In 1633 he was sent to Ireland as second justice of the Court of King's Bench (Ireland). This was probably at the request of the new Lord Lieutenant of Ireland, Thomas Wentworth, 1st Earl of Strafford, a fellow Yorkshireman and a friend of Cressy. He became Treasurer of the King's Inns in 1634, and may also have served as a preacher there. As a judge in his early years he was very active in suppressing recusancy, although he was later accused of excessive leniency to Catholics.

In 1637 the English Crown brought a test case, generally known as "The Case of Tenures", asking the High Court judges to rule on whether all land tenure in Ireland was void unless the title to the land was hereditary. This was an attempt to provide a legal basis for the policy of widespread confiscation of land held by Roman Catholic landowners, especially in Connacht. The judges ruled by five votes to two in the Crown's favour; Cressy was one of the two who dissented (Sir Samuel Mayart was the other). This may have damaged his previously friendly relations with the formidable Strafford, who had instigated the case as a prelude to widespread seizure of land in Connacht, and resented any questioning of his policies, even by a High Court judge.

== Last years ==
After the downfall and execution for treason of Strafford in 1641, Cressy, though by then he was an old man, continued with his judicial duties, attending the Irish House of Lords to give legal advice, and going regularly as the judge of assize to County Wexford. Despite his previous zeal in suppressing recusancy, he now found himself accused of undue leniency to the Catholic Irish. In the fraught political atmosphere of the early 1640s, the accusations were taken seriously, and he was threatened with impeachment. The matter seems to have been unresolved at his death in 1643. He was replaced on the Court of King's Bench by another Englishman, the leading barrister Thomas Bavand of Chester, who died almost at once.

== Family ==
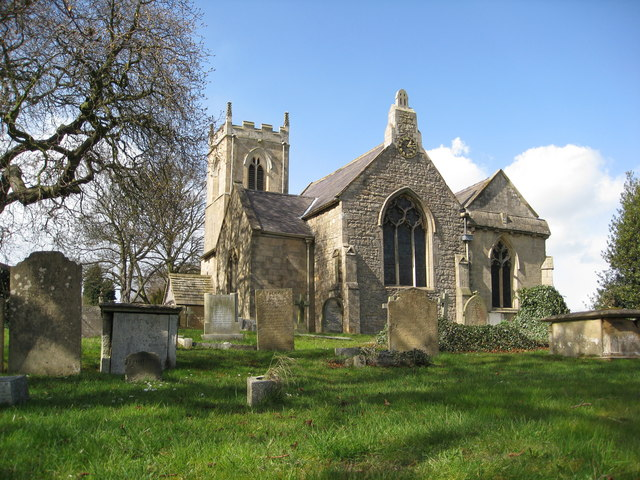
Thorpe Salvin, where de Cressy lived for many years

He married, before 1605, Margery D'Oylie, daughter of Thomas D'Oylie of Hambleden, Buckinghamshire (died 1603), a highly respected physician and Spanish scholar, and his wife Anne Perrot, daughter of Simon Perrot of North Leigh, Oxfordshire, Proctor of Oxford University. The marriage had some political significance, as Margery's uncle Sir Robert D'Oylie of Greenlands, Buckinghamshire, had married Elizabeth Bacon, a half-sister of Francis Bacon, and Bacon and Thomas D'Oylie were good friends.

Their son Hugh Paulinus de Cressy, known to history as Serenus de Cressy (c.1605-1674), the name he was given at his conversion, was ordained a minister of the Church of England, then converted to the Roman Catholic faith, and became a Benedictine monk, a noted Church historian, and chaplain to Queen Catherine of Braganza.

== Sources ==
- Ball, F. Elrington The Judges in Ireland 1221-1921 John Murray London 1926 Vol.1
- Barry, James The Case of Tenures on the Commission of Defective Titles Argued by all the Judges of Ireland, with their Resolution, and the Reasons for their Resolution (1637)
- Stephen, Leslie, ed. (1888). "D'Oylie, Thomas" . Dictionary of National Biography. Vol. 15. London: Smith, Elder & Co.
- Kenny, Colum King's Inns and the Kingdom of Ireland Dublin Irish Academic Press 1992
- Anthony à Wood Athenae Oxonienses: an Exact History of all the Writers and Bishops who have had their Education in the University of Oxford from 1500 to 1690 Rivington London 1813
