= Elizabeth Bacon (died 1621) =

English aristocrat (c. 1541–1621)

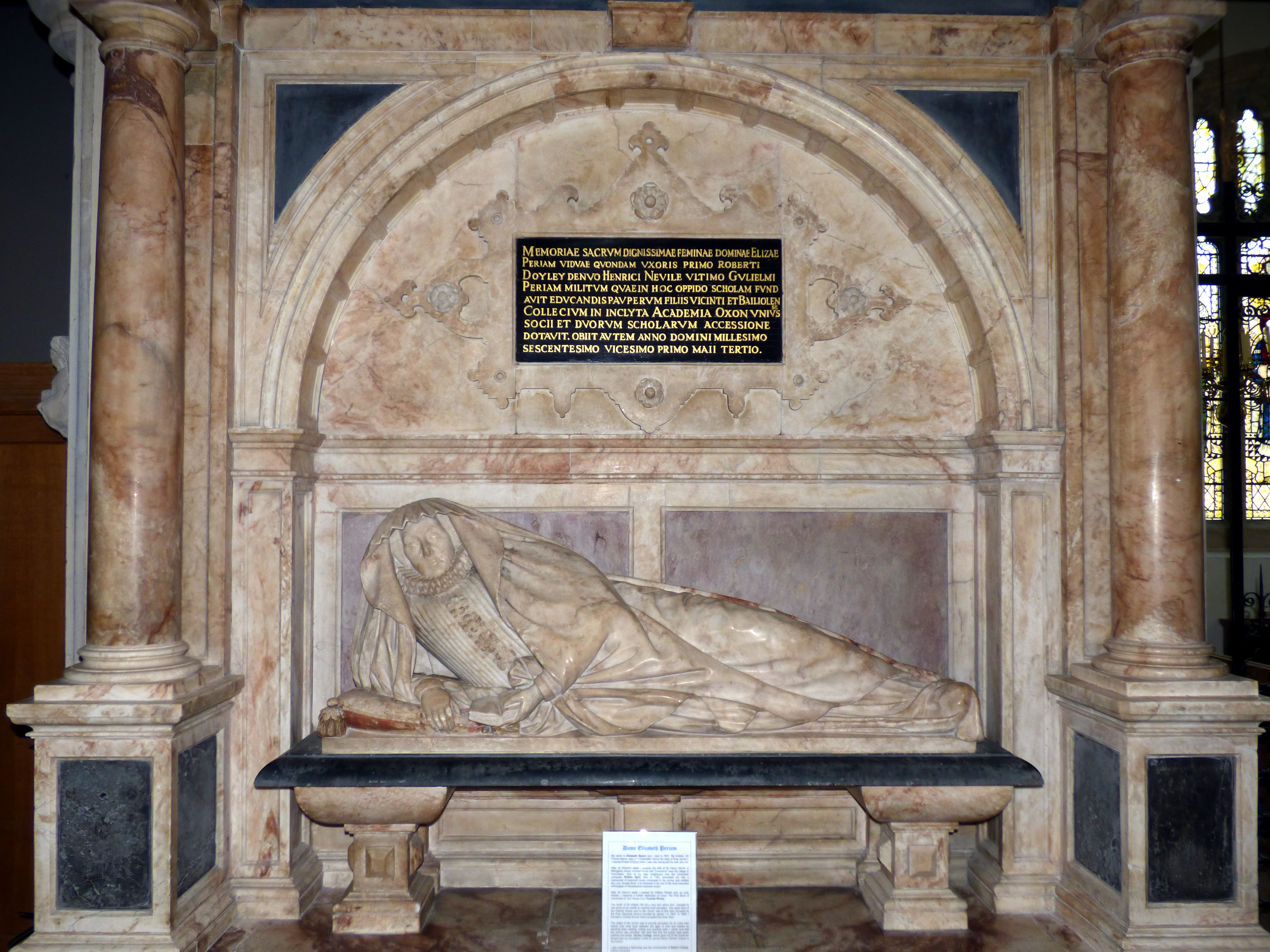
- Interior of St Mary's Church, Henley-on-Thames, where Elizabeth Bacon is buried
- Born: c. 1541
- Died: 3 May 1621 (aged 79–80)
- Spouses: Sir Robert Doyley; Sir Henry Neville; Sir William Peryam
- Parent(s): Sir Nicholas Bacon, Jane Ferneley

Elizabeth Bacon (c. 1541 – 3 May 1621) was an English aristocrat. She is presumed to have been the Lady Neville of My Ladye Nevells Booke, an important manuscript of keyboard music by William Byrd, which was compiled in 1591. She was the daughter of Queen Elizabeth's Lord Keeper of the Great Seal, Sir Nicholas Bacon, by his first wife, Jane Ferneley (d. 1552). She was, successively, the wife of Sir Robert D'Oylie, the courtier Sir Henry Neville, and the judge Sir William Peryam.

== Family ==
Born about 1541, she was the eldest daughter of Sir Nicholas Bacon, Queen Elizabeth's Lord Keeper of the Great Seal, by his first wife, Jane Ferneley (d. 1552). By her father's first marriage, she had three brothers, Sir Nicholas Bacon, 1st Baronet, of Redgrave; Sir Edward Bacon; and Sir Nathaniel Bacon; and two sisters, Anne, who married Sir Henry Woodhouse, and Elizabeth, who married Francis Wyndham. By her father's second marriage, to Anne Cooke, she was the half-sister of Anthony Bacon and Sir Francis Bacon.

== Career ==
Elizabeth Bacon first married Sir Robert Doyley of Chiselhampton, Oxfordshire, 'a member of a prominent land-owning family' and a member of parliament for Bossiney, Cornwall, in 1572. He was knighted in 1576. While serving as a Justice of the Peace at the Oxford assizes of 4–7 July 1577, Doyley and others were, according to John Stowe, infected with a 'strange sickness', whereof the jurors, including 'Sir Robert de Olie', died. Doyley made his last will on 21 July, and was buried on 29 July at Hambleden. In his will, he left several properties to his widow, Elizabeth, according to Harley likely making her 'an independently wealthy woman'. There were no children of the marriage.

Soon after her first husband's death, in about May 1578, Elizabeth Bacon married, as his third wife, Sir Henry Neville, of Billingbear House, Berkshire. As Sir Henry's wife, she became the Lady Nevell of My Ladye Nevells Booke, a manuscript of keyboard music by William Byrd. However, over time her link to the book was forgotten, and it was firmly established only recently by John Harley, following earlier suggestions by Thurston Dart and Alan Brown. Some people have assumed she must have been a keyboard player, but not much is known of her musical activities. Her interest in music is also implied by the dedication to her of a second music book, discussed below.

Letters written by Neville and his third wife during their marriage indicate that they lived at both Billingbear House and at Sir Robert Doyley's former house at Greenlands, and that they also had a home in London. A contemporary inventory of Billingbear survives, mentioning a long gallery, great hall, armoury, and other rooms, including 'Lady Gresham's Chamber', a chamber likely occupied by Frances Gresham, the mother of Neville's second wife, Elizabeth Gresham. According to Harley, in a letter to his brother-in-law, Sir Nathaniel Bacon, in early 1590 Neville referred to his third wife as 'Betty', and stated that she wore 'the bryches' in the household. Neville made his will on 20 April 1592, and died on 13 January 1593. He was buried in the church of Waltham St Lawrence, where there is a monument to his memory. There were no children of the marriage, and Neville's third wife is not mentioned in his will.

Before the end of September 1595, Elizabeth Bacon married, as her third husband and as his third wife, Sir William Peryam, Chief Baron of the Exchequer. Also in 1595, a published music book was dedicated to her as 'Lady Periam': Thomas Morley's The First Booke of Canzonets to Two Voyces. In his dedication, Morley stated that his wife had been in her service. Sir William died at Little Fulford, Devonshire, on 9 October 1604, and Elizabeth was granted administration of his will. There were no children of the marriage.

In 1609 Elizabeth Bacon founded a charity school at Henley-on-Thames.

Elizabeth Bacon made her last will on 12 November 1618, terming herself 'Dame Elizabeth Periam of Greenland', and providing for scholarships or fellowships at Oxford. She died 3 May 1621. There is a monument to her in the church of St Mary's, Henley-on-Thames.

A number of Elizabeth Bacon's letters survive, including both family correspondence and business letters dealing with the administration of her properties.

== Marriages ==
Elizabeth Bacon married, firstly, Sir Robert D'Oylie (d. July 1577) of Chislehampton, Oxfordshire, and Greenlands in Hambleden, Buckinghamshire. He was a victim of that still-unexplained mass death called the Black Assize of Oxford 1577. He was the eldest brother of the noted physician Thomas D'Oylie.

She married, secondly, about May 1578, as his third wife, Sir Henry Neville of Billingbear House, Berkshire. Neville had been married, firstly, to Winifred Losse (d. in or before 1561), daughter of Hugh Losse (d. 1555) of Whitchurch, London, by whom he had no issue, and, secondly, by 1561, to Elizabeth Gresham (d. 6 or 7 November 1573), granddaughter of Sir Richard Gresham, Lord Mayor of London, and only daughter and heir of the latter's elder son, John Gresham (d. 1560), by Frances Thwaytes, the daughter and coheir of Sir Henry Thwaytes of Lund, Yorkshire. In the will of their grandmother, Frances (née Thwaytes) Gresham, dated 20 October 1580 and proved 9 November 1580, Neville's children by his second marriage are named as Henry, Edward, Francis, William and Katherine. Katherine married Edmund Doyley of Shottisham, Norfolk.

After Neville's death, she married, before the end of September 1595, Sir William Peryam (d. 9 October 1604). Elizabeth Bacon had no issue by any of her marriages.
