= Thomas Dongan (judge) =

Irish judge

Thomas Dongan (c.1590–1663) was an Irish judge of the seventeenth century. His career was dogged by accusations of recusancy and of disloyalty to the English Crown. He is chiefly remembered as the father of Margaret Dongan, wife of the Dutch scholar Arnold Boate, who commemorated her lovingly in his book The Character of a Truly Virtuous and Pious Woman, and also wrote with affection and respect about her father.

== Background ==
He was the fourth and youngest son of John Dongan of Castletown, County Kildare (died 1592), second Remembrancer of the Exchequer of Ireland, and his wife Margaret Forster, daughter of Walter Forster, a wine merchant of Winetavern Street, Dublin. His parents died when Thomas was still an infant, and he and his brothers were fostered with relatives. His eldest brother Sir Walter Dongan (1579–1626) was created the first of the Dongan Baronets, and was the ancestor of the Earls of Limerick. His father John Dongan, son of Thady Dongan of Fishamble Street, Dublin and his wife Joan Donlan, was a wealthy man, and left him substantial lands, mainly in County Kildare.

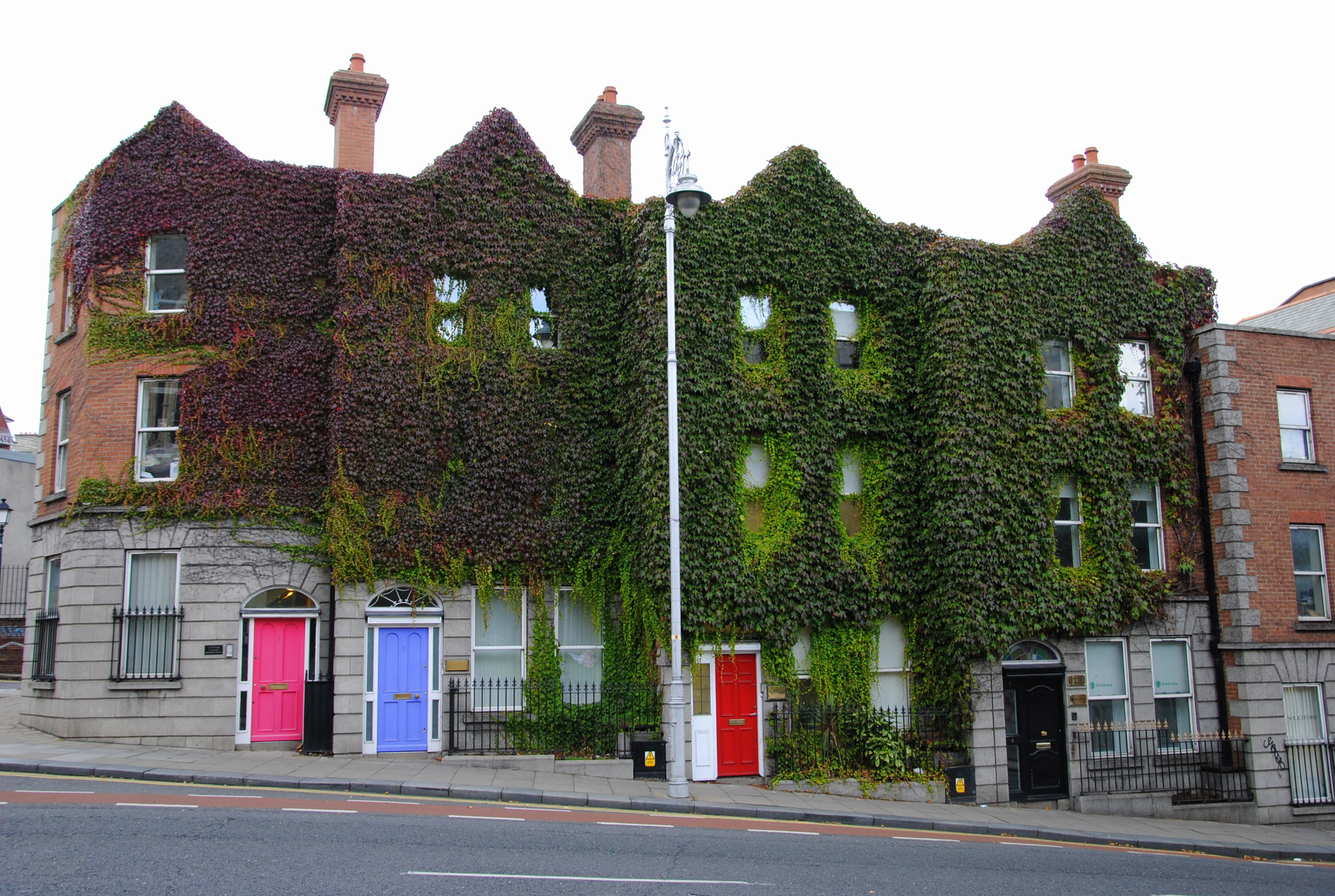
Winetavern Street, Dublin-Dongan had family here

== Early career ==
Thomas entered Lincoln's Inn in 1615 but was expelled for recusancy. It is likely that he remained a convinced Roman Catholic all his life (although his son-in-law records that he raised his children as Protestants, and his first wife Grace was a Protestant), but by 1627 he had outwardly conformed to the Church of England, and was readmitted to Lincoln's Inn and called to the English Bar. His clients included the Lord High Treasurer, Lionel Cranfield, 1st Earl of Middlesex. He married an English wife, Grace Palmer of Nottinghamshire, and practised law in England for some years. He returned to Ireland, where he was admitted to the King's Inn and called to the Irish Bar in 1640. He lived near Castletown, in a house which his father had left him.

== Civil War and Interregnum ==
He amassed considerable wealth, in addition to the lands he had inherited from his father, although he was to lose virtually all of his property and money during the Irish Rebellion of 1641. He acquired as his patron James Butler, 1st Duke of Ormonde. Ormonde sent him to the English Court with a recommendation as to his loyalty, and he was appointed a justice of the Court of King's Bench (Ireland) in 1644. His appointment was probably something of a last minute choice, as he replaced Thomas Bavand of Chester, who had died suddenly in England before he could travel to Ireland to take up office. By 1648, when the Royalist cause had been utterly defeated in Ireland, he was said to be the only High Court judge still sitting in Dublin. He was also in financial distress, which may explain his decision, which greatly harmed his reputation, to accept office under the new government of Oliver Cromwell. He acted as a High Court judge in Leinster and Ulster and sat on the High Court of Justice which tried, convicted and condemned Sir Felim O'Neill and other rebels to death for treason in 1652-3. He gained no permanent benefit from his support for the Cromwellian regime, which regarded him with a good deal of suspicion, due to his Anglo-Irish background and his numerous Catholic relatives. He was passed over for a permanent position on the Bench in 1655, and by 1659 he was reduced to such a state of poverty that the King's Inn excused the payment of his fees and let him live free of rent in his chamber at the Inn.

His family life was marked by tragedy: his eldest son William was killed in 1645 at the storming of Leicester on the eve of the Battle of Naseby, and his first wife Grace died soon afterwards. He remarried but lost his second wife in 1653. His daughter Margaret died in 1651 and her husband Arnold Boate in 1653. He may have married for a third time.

He was a man with a strong sense of family loyalty, and during his brief period of influence during Oliver Cromwell's regime, he is said to have used his position to assist his Royalist relatives, who were threatened with forfeiture of their estates. In particular, he protected Mary Talbot, Lady Dongan, the widow of his nephew Sir John Dongan, 2nd Baronet (who had died in 1650), and her numerous children, two of whom later held the title Earl of Limerick. With Dongan's help, this branch of the family were able to retain much of their property.

== Restoration ==
After the Restoration of Charles II, Dongan, who was living in a state of dire poverty, begged to be reappointed to the Bench, despite his age, ill health, Catholic sympathies and dubious political loyalties. Probably Ormonde, who was soon to become Lord Lieutenant of Ireland, and who never forgot a friend, recommended him for preferment, and he was appointed third Baron of the Court of Exchequer (Ireland). Ball notes that his appointment came at the last possible moment (January 1661), on the grounds that he was unfit for office and, it was reckoned, would be unlikely to serve for long. This assumption was justified: by 1663 he was pleading to be allowed to retire on account of his age and ill health, and he died in late June of that year. He was survived by his youngest son and heir John, of Possickstown, County Kildare, and his granddaughter Mariana Boate.

== Character ==
Elrington Ball's unflattering portrait of Dongan in The Judges in Ireland is balanced by the kindly and respectful portrayal of the judge by his son-in-law Arnold Boate,which emphasizes his family virtues. While his service under Cromwell led to understandable accusations of treachery to the Stuart dynasty, or at least time-serving, it should also be remembered that he used his position to assist relatives in distress.
