= Samuel Mayart =

Justice of the Irish Common Pleas

Sir Samuel Mayart (1587–c.1646) was an English-born judge in seventeenth-century Ireland, who also had some reputation as a political theorist.

== Early career ==
He was born in Ipswich, Suffolk, in 1587, the son of Gilbert Mayart, who was of Flemish origin. Samuel went to Merton College, Oxford, and matriculated in 1604. He was admitted to the Middle Temple in 1607 and was called to the Bar in 1614.

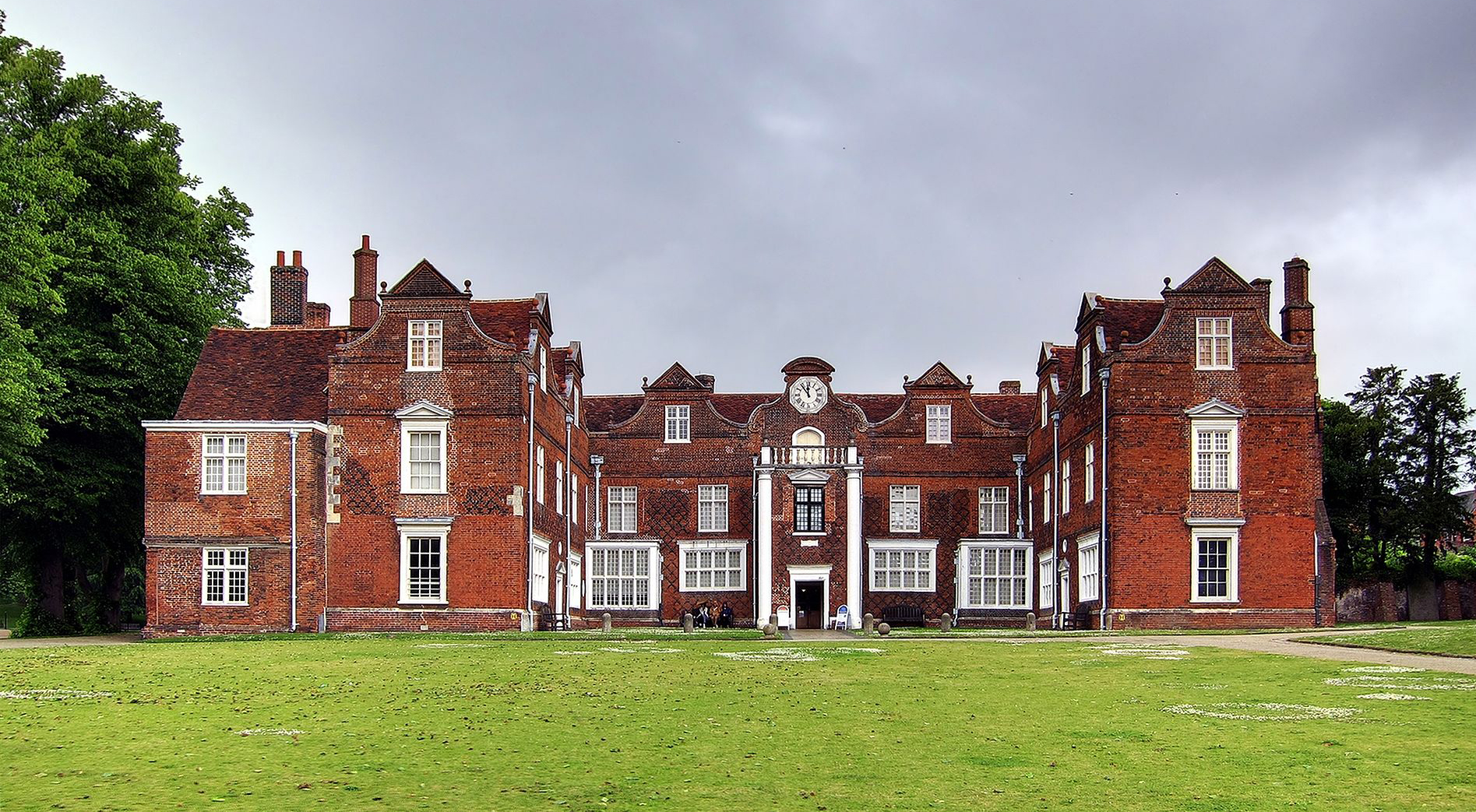
Ipswich, where the Mayart family lived: they were originally from Flanders

Within a very short time, he decided to practice law in Ireland: he was called to the Irish Bar in 1616 and entered the King's Inns in the same year. He became Treasurer of the King's Inns in 1633. He settled near Dublin, where he lived at Oxmantown, north of the River Liffey. Unlike most Irish judges of the time, he never became a substantial landowner, although he played some part in the development of the new town of Mountrath in County Laois in the early 1620s.

In religion, he was a convinced Protestant and inclined to Puritanism. He is said to have been close to James Ussher, Archbishop of Armagh, with whom he had a family tie through his second wife, who was Ussher's widowed aunt, Mary Smith.

== A Judge in Ireland ==
In 1624 a seat on the Court of Common Pleas (Ireland) became vacant on the death of Gerard Lowther. Mayart was very anxious to obtain the position, and offered the English Crown £300 for it (this caused some comment, as the seat was valued at only £100). His fitness for the office was questioned, but Sir Richard Bolton, soon to become Chief Baron of the Irish Exchequer, and his son Edward, both vouched for his integrity and legal ability, and after some delay, he was appointed to the Common Pleas in 1626. He was knighted in 1631, and when Parliament was in session he regularly attended the Irish House of Lords to furnish the peers with legal advice. He became a master in the Court of Chancery (Ireland) and regularly went as a judge of assize on the North-Eastern Circuit.

== The Case of Tenures (1637) ==
In 1637 all the Irish High Court judges were asked to deliver their opinion in the Case of Tenures upon the Commission of Defective Titles: this was a test case brought by the English Crown to provide a legal basis for the widespread confiscation of land from Catholic landowners, and in particular to clear the way for the Plantation of Connacht. By a majority of five to two, the High Court judges declared that all tenures which were not hereditary were invalid, thus giving the Crown the necessary legal justification for its actions. Mayart was one of two judges who dissented from the judgment, Hugh de Cressy being the other, although Mayart did so on technical grounds.

His dissent suggests that he was a man of both integrity and moral courage (although he had dabbled in a Plantation scheme himself in about 1620). The Plantation of Connacht was a personal project of Thomas Wentworth, 1st Earl of Strafford, the formidable and almost all-powerful Lord Lieutenant of Ireland, and one to which he attached great importance. Nor was Strafford a man to tolerate any questioning of his policy, even by his colleagues in Government. Judges in his view, both Irish and English, were Crown servants like any others: their function was simply to serve the King, and they were expected to give judgment in favour of the Crown in any case where the King's rights were questioned. His attitude is shown by his outrage when a minority of the English High Court judges ruled against the Crown in The Case of Ship Money (R v. Hampden) the following year. Mayart's colleague De Cressy also risked Strafford's anger through his dissent, although the two men were old friends.

Mayard's career between 1637 and 1644 is poorly documented. In May 1639 he joined with William Brabazon, 1st Earl of Meath, in a conveyance of certain properties in County Fermanagh, the other parties being the Earl's sister Elizabeth and her husband Sir John Bramston. In 1641 the Commons voted that he be compensated for his loss of salary, which had been reduced in 1629.

== Political writings ==
In 1644 Mayart was drawn into a major political controversy after an anonymous treatise entitled A Declaration setting forth how and by what means the laws and statutes of England came to be of force in Ireland (1643) was published, arguing the case that there had always been an independent Irish Parliament, which must give its assent to any English laws passed for Ireland. The author was widely believed to be Mayart's patron Sir Richard Bolton, by then Lord Chancellor of Ireland, but there is no firm evidence for this. Since the matter was politically sensitive, the House of Lords asked the judges to advise them on the form of a report on the treatise. In the event no report was issued, but Mayart on his own initiative published an "Answer" to the Declaration, which received a favourable reception, arguing powerfully that the Parliament of Ireland had always been subordinate to the English Parliament. He also acted as an intermediary between the two Houses in the matter.

== Death and Family ==
He was last heard of in attendance on the Lords in February 1646, and is thought to have died soon afterwards.

He married three times, but was apparently childless by all his marriages. Little is known of his first wife. His second wife was Mary Smith, widow of Henry Ussher, Archbishop of Armagh, and of William FitzWilliam of Dundrum, Dublin. His third wife was Dorcas Newcomen, daughter of Sir Robert Newcomen, 1st Baronet and his first wife Catherine Molyneux, and widow of Francis White of Redhills, County Cavan, Principal Secretary to the Lord Lieutenant of Ireland, and of George Richards.

== Sources ==
- Ball, F. Elrington The Judges in Ireland 1221-1921 John Murray London 1926 2 Volumes
- Barnard, Toby; Ó Cróinín, Dáibhí; Sims, Katherine eds. A Miracle of Learning:Studies in Manuscripts and Irish Learning:Essays in honour of William O'Sullivan Routledge Abingdon Oxford 2016
- Clarke, Aidan "Mayart, Sir Samuel" Cambridge Dictionary of National Biography
- Debrett's Peerage 13th Edition London 1820
- Kenny, Colum King's Inns and the Kingdom of Ireland Dublin Irish Academic Press 1992
- Pollard, Albert Frederick (1894). "Mayart, Samuel" . In Lee, Sidney (ed.). Dictionary of National Biography. Vol. 37. London: Smith, Elder & Co.
- Wedgwood, C.V. Thomas Wentworth, 1st Earl of Strafford 1593-1641-a revaluation Phoenix Press reissue 2000
