= Cressy (surname) =

Cressy or de Cressy is a surname of French origin. It is a French and English toponymic surname of Norman origin for people who lived in Cressy, Seine-Maritime, Cressy-sur-Somme or Cressy-Omencourt. It is also a Southern French toponymic surname for people who lived on rocky land, based on the Occitan words cres and gres. Notable people with the name include:

== Given name ==
- David Cressy, American historian and professor
- Emily Cressy (born 1989), American footballer
- Gordon Cressy (born 1943), Canadian politician
- Harold Cressy (1889–1916), South African headteacher and activist
- Hugh de Cressy (died 1189), Anglo-Norman administrator and nobleman
- Hugh de Cressy (1570–1643), English judge in Ireland
- Hugh Cressy (MP), Member of Parliament for Nottinghamshire
- Joe Cressy (born 1984), Canadian politician
- Maxime Cressy (born 1997), American tennis player
- Serenus de Cressy (c. 1605–1674), English monk
- Will Cressy (1863–1930), American vaudeville comedian and playwright

== Middle name ==
- Abraham Cressy Morrison (1864–1951), American chemist
- John Cressy-Hall (1843–1894), English cricketer and merchant
- Theodore Cressy Skeat (1907–2003), British academic and librarian
- Violet Cressy-Marcks (1895–1970), British explorer
