= Cressey =

Cressey may refer to:

== People ==
- Cressey (surname)

== Places ==
- Cressey, California, a census-designated place in the northern part of Merced County, California

== Other uses ==
- Thoma Cressey Bravo, American private equity firm

== See also ==
- Cressy (disambiguation)
- Crecy (disambiguation)
