= Crecy (disambiguation) =

The Battle of Crécy was a major battle of the Hundred Years' War (1337–1453) fought in 1346. It was the culmination of the English army's Crécy campaign.

Crécy or Crecy may also refer to:

== Places ==
=== France ===
- Aunay-sous-Crécy, a commune in France
- Crécy-en-Ponthieu, a commune in France
- Crécy-sur-Serre, a commune in France
- Estrées-lès-Crécy, a commune in France
- Montigny-sur-Crécy, a commune in France
- Crécy-la-Chapelle, a commune in France
- Canton of Crécy-la-Chapelle, a canton in France
- Canton of Crécy-en-Ponthieu, a canton in France
- Canton of Crécy-sur-Serre, a canton in France
- Crécy-la-Chapelle station, a train station in France

=== Elsewhere ===
- Crecy, South Australia, original name of Mindarie, in 1912
- Crecy Hill, Tackley, Oxfordshire, England, UK; a hill

== Arts and entertainment ==
- Crécy (comics), a graphic novel set during the Crécy campaign
- Odette De Crecy, a character from the novel In Search of Lost Time (À la recherche du temps perdu) by Marcel Proust

== People ==
- Louis de Verjus, comte de Crécy (1629–1709), a French politician and diplomat

=== People with the surname ===
- Étienne de Crécy (born 1969), French DJ and producer
- Hugh of Crécy (died 1147), French rebel and assassin
- Warren G. H. Crecy, WWII U.S. tank commander

== Technology ==
- Rolls-Royce Crecy, an aero engine
- Vickers Wellington or Crecy, a bomber

== See also ==
- Henry Crécy Yarrow (1840–1928), U.S. biologist
- Cressey (disambiguation)
- Cressy (disambiguation)
