= Richard Bolton (lawyer) =

English lawyer and judge (1570–1648)

Sir Richard Bolton (January 1570 – November 1648) was an English lawyer and judge, who was an important figure in Irish political life in the 1630s and 1640s.

== Life ==
He was the son of John Bolton, of Fenton, Staffordshire and Margaret Ash, daughter of Richard Ash, and was born about 1570. He apparently practised for a time as a barrister in England. He was a defendant in a lawsuit about land in Fenton Calvert, Stafford, three miles from Newcastle-under-Lyme, in Queen Elizabeth I's time. He moved to Ireland with the object, it was alleged, of avoiding the results of an unfavourable judgment passed on him by the court of Star-Chamber in this lawsuit. At the end of 1604, he obtained office as temporary Recorder of Dublin, and was confirmed in the post in 1605. He became an Alderman of Dublin Corporation the same year.

Through government influence he was elected in 1613, in opposition to the Roman Catholic candidate, one of the representatives of Dublin City in the Irish House of Commons of which the Crown candidate Sir John Davies became the Speaker, although it was credibly claimed that a majority of the House had actually voted for the Catholic candidate Sir John Everard. Bolton resigned from the Recordership of Dublin in the same year.

Bolton received a knighthood in 1618 from Sir Oliver St John, Lord Deputy of Ireland. At the end of 1618, Bolton was appointed Solicitor-General for Ireland.

Bolton became Attorney-General to the Court of Wards at Dublin in 1622 and was appointed Chief Baron of the Irish Exchequer in 1625.

In December 1639 Bolton was appointed Lord Chancellor of Ireland. As Chancellor, Bolton presided in the Irish Parliament which commenced in Dublin in March 1640. Bolton was regarded as a chief adviser of Thomas Wentworth, 1st Earl of Strafford, the Lord Lieutenant, in his attempts to introduce arbitrary government. The Privy Council of Ireland was dominated by four of Strafford's allies: Sir George Radcliffe, James Butler, Earl of Ormonde, Lord Roscommon who was a connection of Strafford by marriage, and Bolton. On 11 February 1641, the House of Lords acquitted him on a charge of having endeavoured to prevent the continuance of the existing parliament. In a letter dated 11 February 1641 Bolton transmitted to the committee of the house attending the king in England a schedule of grievances of Ireland voted by the Irish House of Lords at Dublin on the same day.

Strafford's fall from power began late in 1640. On 27 February 1641 a committee was appointed by the House of Commons in Ireland to draw up charges against Bolton, Radcliffe, John Bramhall, bishop of Derry, and Sir Gerard Lowther, Chief Justice of the Irish Common Pleas, to impeach them of high treason. The Chancellor, as chairman of the house, had to receive the articles against himself. The house after some further debate declared that the Lord Chancellor was not fit to execute that place. Sir William Ryves, second justice of the Court of King's Bench, was appointed by letters patent Speaker of the Irish House of Lords, during the King's pleasure, in the absence of the Chancellor, and took up office on 11 May 1641.

The complexion of matters was changed by the Irish Rebellion of 1641, and eventually, the impeachment proceedings were dropped; they had at least in part been tactical, to prevent Strafford's allies being called as witnesses in his defence at his impeachment. Bolton, a member of the Privy Council at Dublin, signed the despatch of 25 October 1641, announcing to Robert Sidney, 2nd Earl of Leicester, Strafford's successor as Lord-Lieutenant of Ireland but then in England, the hostile movements in Ireland. By a resolution of 21 June 1642, that no members should sit or vote until they had taken the oath of supremacy, the House of Commons excluded the Roman Catholic representatives, among whom were those who had been most active in the proceedings against Bolton and his associates. On the same day, Bolton and Lowther petitioned the House, and it was unanimously resolved to proceed no further upon the articles of accusation against them. On the following day, Bolton was restored by the lords to his place as Chancellor, and on 2 August 1642 resumed his position in their House.

Bolton was actively engaged in negotiations connected with the cessation of hostilities between England and the Irish in 1643. In 1644 Bolton was a principal counsellor of the Lord-Lieutenant, Ormonde, in negotiating with the Irish confederation concerning peace. His name appears first amongst those of the privy council who signed the proclamation issued at Dublin on 30 July 1646 announcing the conclusion of a treaty of peace between Charles I of England and his Roman Catholic subjects in Ireland. He joined in the statement on the condition of Ireland of 19 February 1647 submitted by Ormonde to Charles I. Sir Richard Bolton died in November 1648.

Strafford's biographer calls Bolton an honest and able, if rather colourless man, and a dependable servant of the Crown.

== Works ==
In 1621 Bolton published at Dublin, in a folio volume, a selection of statutes passed in parliaments held in Ireland. Bolton dedicated this work to his benefactor Sir Oliver St. John, Lord Deputy of Ireland. An addition containing statutes of the tenth and eleventh years of Charles I was published in 1635. Bolton published in 1638, at Dublin, A Justice of Peace for Ireland, with a second edition appearing in 1683. In the first edition, Bolton praised the peaceful and settled condition of Ireland; a condition which was to change all too quickly.

Bolton was erroneously supposed to have been the author of a brief treatise published in 1643 entitled A Declaration setting forth how and by what means the laws and statutes of England from time to time came to be of force in Ireland. Sir Samuel Mayart, Bolton's colleague on the High Court Bench, whose career he had advanced, published an "Answer" to the Declaration shortly afterwards, arguing that the Parliament of Ireland had always been subordinate to the English Parliament.

== Family ==
By his first wife, Frances, daughter of Richard Walter of Stafford, he left two surviving sons, Edward and John, and several daughters, including Mary, who married Patrick Nangle, Baron of Navan, and Anne, who married Arthur Hill of Hillsborough, County Down, a political figure of some importance in the 1640s and 50s.

Frances died c.1642. His second wife, whom he married in 1646, was Margaret, daughter of Sir Patrick Barnewall of Turvey and Mary Bagenal, and widow of Luke Netterville, second son of Nicholas Netterville, 1st Viscount Netterville. This marriage was advantageous for Richard as Margaret possessed considerable estates in Dublin and County Louth, which her first husband had settled on her. Richard however was said to have suffered greatly during the troubles, and to have been in a state of near-poverty in his last years. Lady Bolton was still living in 1663, when she petitioned the Lord Lieutenant of Ireland for the arrears of salary due to her late husband. She explained that she was in financial distress and reduced to living on "the charity of Christian friends". It seems that during the troubles of the 1640s and 50s she had been deprived of her own lands by the Harcourt family.

Bolton's son Edward succeeded him as Solicitor-General for Ireland in 1622, and as Chief Baron in 1640. On the death of Charles I, Edward Bolton was reappointed Chief Baron by Charles II. From that office, he was removed by the parliamentarian government, which, however, employed him in 1651 as commissioner for the administration of justice in Ireland. He died in the last year of the Commonwealth.

== Notes ==
Legal offices
| Preceded by Adam Loftus, 1st Viscount Loftus | Lord Chancellor of Ireland; 1639–1648 | Vacant Title next held by William Steele |
