= William Peryam =

English judge (1534–1604)

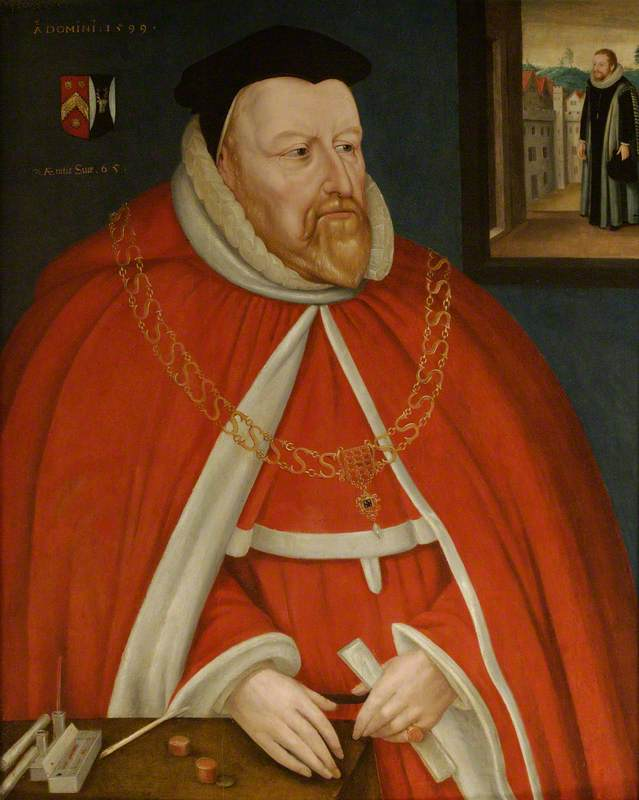
Sir William Peryam (1534–1604), portrait made around the end of the 16th century.

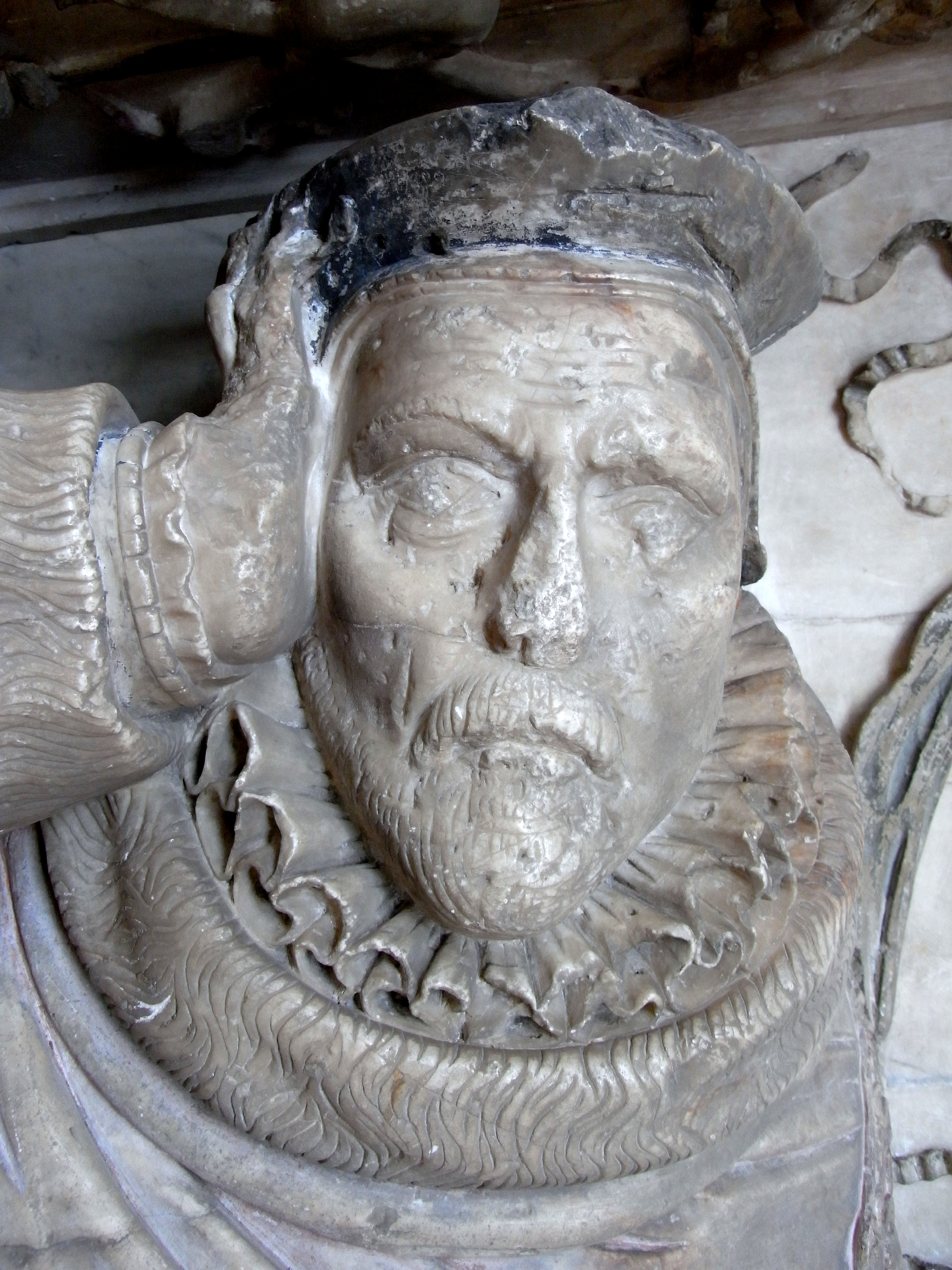
Sir William Peryam (1534–1604), detail from his monument in Crediton Church, Devon

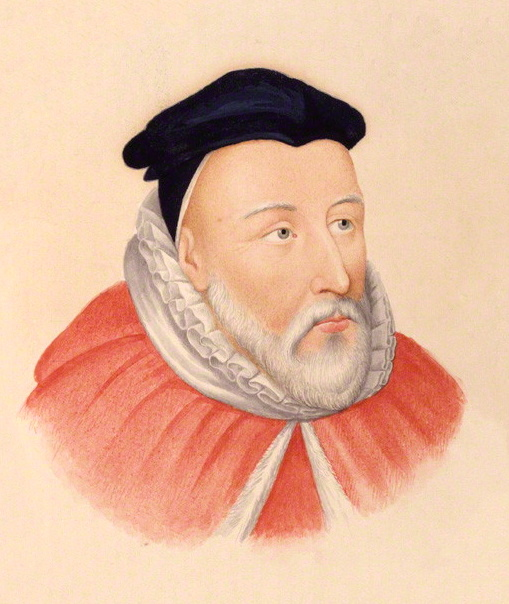
Sir William Peryam (1534–1604), by unknown artist, watercolour, c. 1600. Given in 1877 to the National Portrait Gallery, London, by the Society of Judges and Serjeants-at-Law. Ref: NPG 477

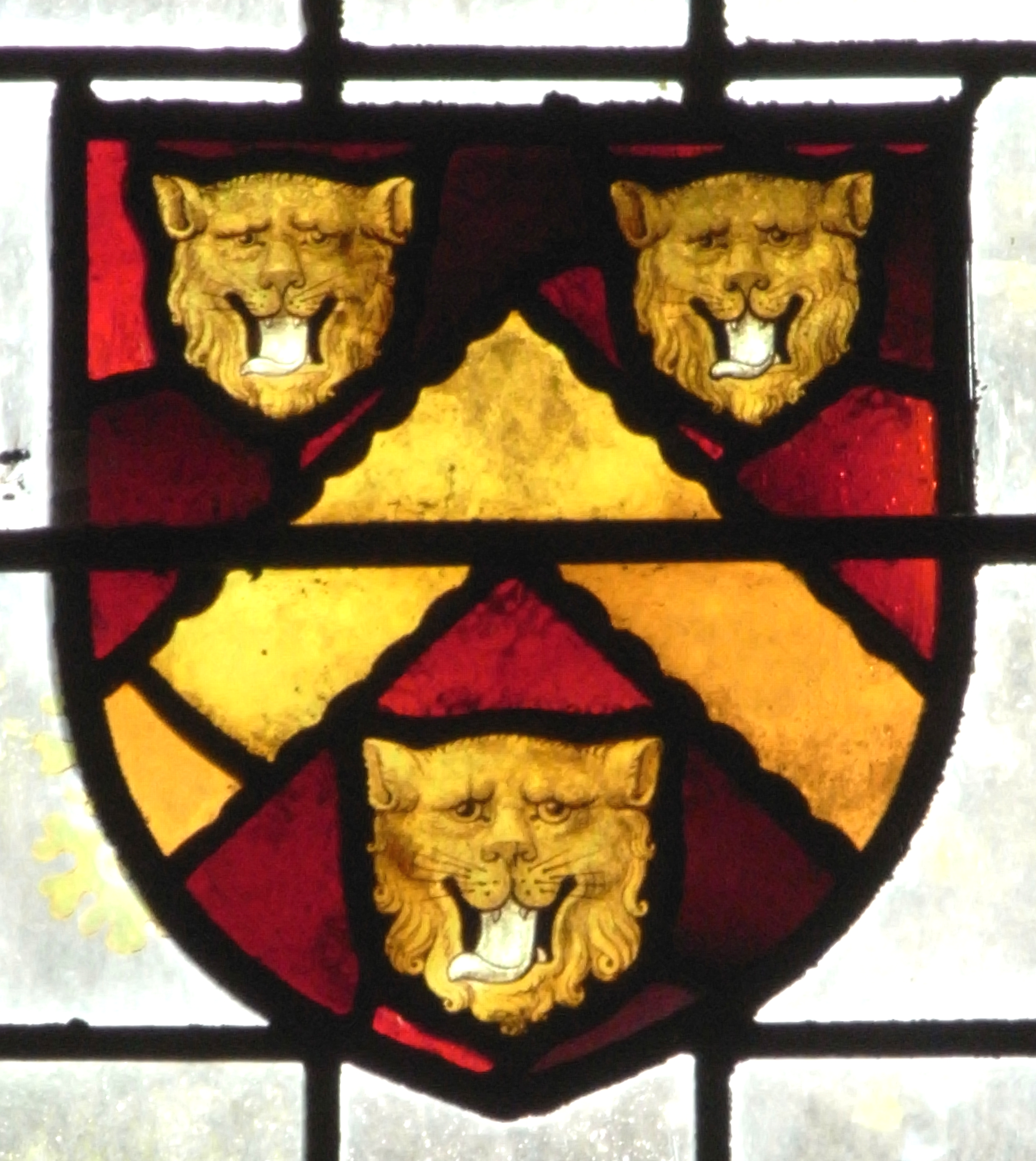
Arms of Sir William Peryam (died 1604): Gules, a chevron engrailed between three lion's faces or, detail from heraldic window c. 1924 in Crediton Church, Devon, south wall of south transept, bequeathed by Rev. W.M. Smith-Dorrien (died 1924), Vicar of Crediton

Sir William Peryam (1534 – 9 October 1604) of Little Fulford, near Crediton in Devon, was an English judge who rose to the position of Lord Chief Baron of the Exchequer in 1593, and was knighted by Queen Elizabeth I.

== Origins ==
Peryam was born in Exeter, the eldest son of John Peryam, twice mayor of Exeter, and his wife Elizabeth, a daughter and co-heir of Robert Hone of Ottery. The year of Peryam's birth is known to history but, as was common in the 16th century, the day and month went unrecorded. Through his mother's sister, Joan Bodley née Hone, Peryam was cousin to Sir Thomas Bodley. Like the Bodleys, the Peryams were early adherents of Protestantism and were also threatened in the time of Marian persecutions. Under Queen Elizabeth however, the family thrived, with William eventually achieving eminence in law and his younger brother John Peryam (1541 – c. 1618), MP, elected to Parliament four times (Barnstaple 1584, Bossiney 1586, Exeter 1589 and 1593) and becoming Mayor of Exeter. The lawyer and politician William Hakewill and the clergyman and author George Hakewill were his nephews.

== Education ==
Young William was first educated in Exeter and then at Exeter College, Oxford where on 25 April 1551 he was elected fellow. He resigned his fellowship some months later and went to London where he eventually studied law at the Middle Temple, being called to the bar in 1565.

== Career ==
A slight setback in his career occurred in 1568 when, after having been summoned to Ireland by Sir Peter Carew to help him prosecute an ultimately successful claim to an Irish barony, Peryam received an unexpected appointment as a judge under the prospective President of Munster, Sir John Pollard. By writing to Sir William Cecil and earnestly petitioning the Privy Council, mentioning his wife and children and delicate state of health, Peryam seems to have been able to avoid the transfer to Ireland altogether. Thereafter, his rise through the legal ranks was steady: in 1575 he became serjeant-at-law for the Michaelmas term, and on 13 February 1581, a Judge of the Court of Common Pleas. His highest office came in January 1593, when he was knighted and promoted to Lord Chief Baron of the Exchequer. Of his knighthood Prince wrote as follows: "Queen Elizabeth of blessed memory, as a signal testimony of her favour and his worth, was pleased to confer upon him the honour of knighthood, but not before he had been twelve years a judge, so cautious was that wise princess in conferring titles, lest they should become cheap and contemptible".

== Landholdings ==
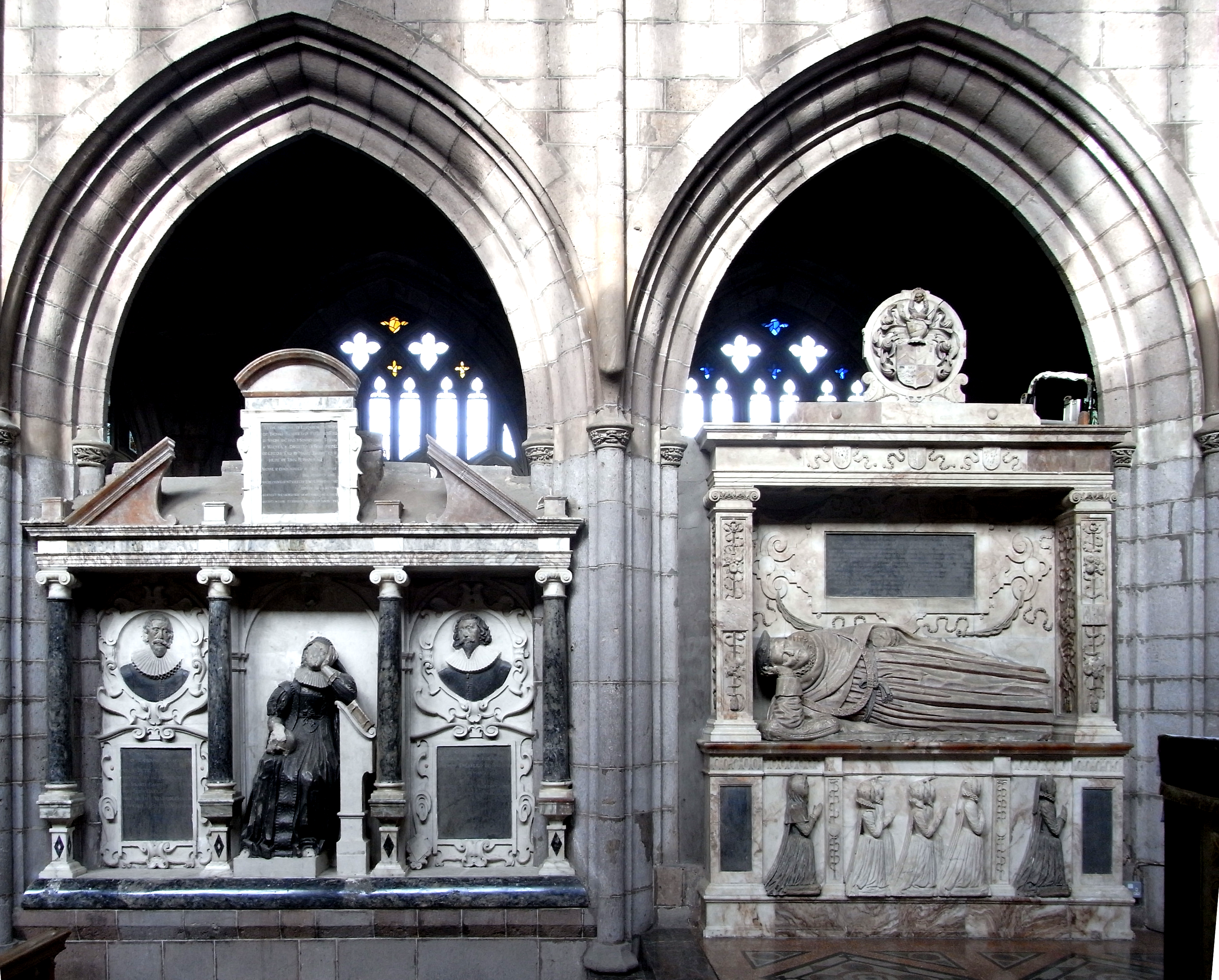
Peryam (right) and Tuckfield (left) monuments in Holy Cross Church, Crediton. The reclining figure at right is Sir William Peryam, of Little Fulford. The female seated figure at left is Elizabeth Reynell, heiress of Little Fulford, Creedy Wiger and the manor of Shobrooke, grand-daughter of Sir William's younger brother John Peryam and wife of Thomas I Tuckfield, shown in medallion to right

According to the Devon historian Sir William Pole (died 1635), who happened to be one of Sir William Peryam's sons-in-law and through his wife Mary Peryam one of his co-heirs, Sir William Peryam acquired the following estates, all situated near or adjoining one another in or near the parishes of Shobrooke, Crediton and possibly Sandford. All ended up unified in the possession of the Tuckfield family, who made Little Fulford their seat for many generations, either through inheritance from Elizabeth Reynell, wife of Thomas I Tuckfield, a daughter of Richard Reynell and his wife Mary Peryam, daughter and heiress of John Peryam, or by purchase.

- Fulford, of which he first purchased a long lease, and later purchased the freehold from Robert Mallet of Wolleigh. Here he "bwilded a fayre howse & dwelled their". The remainder of the lease he bequeathed to trustees who granted it to his daughter Mary Basset, who sold it to the Tuckfields. The freehold interest became the joint inheritance of all four daughters, three of whom sold their shares to the Tuckfields, whilst Mary Pole retained her share (as at the time of Sir William Pole's writing).
- Little Fulford, in the parish of Shobrooke, which he also acquired by means not stated by Pole. It descended to two of his four daughters and co-heiresses, namely Mary Pole and Elizabeth Basset, who jointly sold it to Richard Reynell, the son-in-law of Sir William Peryam's younger brother John Peryam. It was inherited by the Tuckfields.
- Manor of Shobrooke, which he purchased from Richard Carew. He granted it to his daughter Mary Basset, who sold it to Richard Reynell. It was inherited by the Tuckfields.
- Creedy Wiger, purchased from Thomas Prideaux of Nutwell. He built there another "fayre dwellinge howse", which unlike the house he built at Fulford, Pole does not describe as his residence. It descended to his four daughters, who jointly sold it to their uncle John Peryam, who made it his seat, and bequeathed it to his eldest daughter Mary Peryam, wife of Richard Reynell, who made it their home. It was inherited by the Tuckfields.
- Templeton, which he purchased from Robert Loosemore. On the marriage of his eldest daughter Mary Peryam, he granted it as part of her marriage settlement to her husband Sir William Pole (1561–1635).

== Marriage and children ==
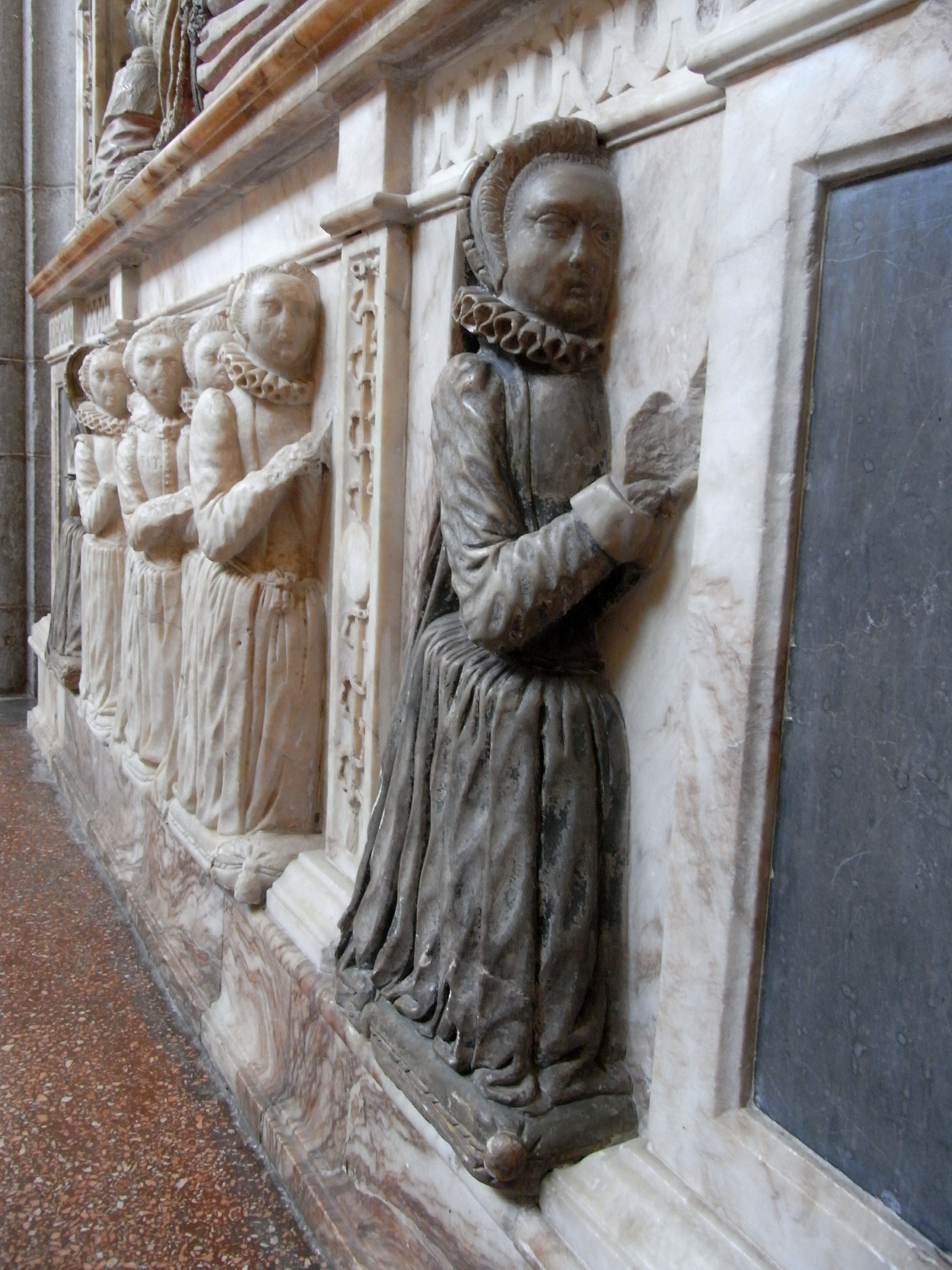
3 wives & 4 daughters of Sir William Peryam, detail from base of his monument in Crediton Church. In the foreground is his 3rd wife Elizabeth Bacon

Peryam married three times:

- Firstly, to Margery Holcote, daughter of John Holcote of Barcote in Berkshire (now Oxfordshire) and widow of Roger Hutchinson of Yorkshire, without children.
- Secondly, to Anne Parker, daughter of John Parker of North Molton (ancestor of the Earls of Morley of Saltram House), by whom he had four daughters, all his co-heiresses, and all of whom made advantageous marriages to West Country gentry:
  - Mary Peryam (died 1606), the eldest, (effigy in Colyton Church, see below), married as his first wife Sir William Pole (1561–1635) the antiquarian and historian of Devon, of Colcombe Castle, Colyton, and Shute, Devon. She was buried in Shute Church on 8 May 1606.
  - Elizabeth Peryam (1571–1635), 2nd daughter, (effigy in Heanton Punchardon Church, see below), married Sir Robert Basset (1574–1641), MP, of Heanton Punchardon, Devon. She inherited as her portion the estate of Little Fulford, which her husband sold to the Tuckfield family.
  - Jane Peryam (1572–1620), 3rd daughter, married twice: firstly to Thomas Poyntz (died 1597), of North Ockendon, Essex & Gray's Inn, son of Sir Gabriel Poyntz (died 1608), of North Ockendon, Sheriff of Essex; secondly to Thomas Docwra, Sheriff of Hertfordshire.
  - Anne Peryam, youngest daughter, married William Williams, son and heir of Sir John Williams of Herringstone, Dorset.
- Thirdly, to Elizabeth Bacon, daughter of Sir Nicholas Bacon, Lord Keeper of the Great Seal, and eldest half-sister of Sir Francis Bacon, who survived him by seventeen years. Without children. It was a third marriage for both of them.

=== Monuments to daughters ===
==== Mary Peryham ====
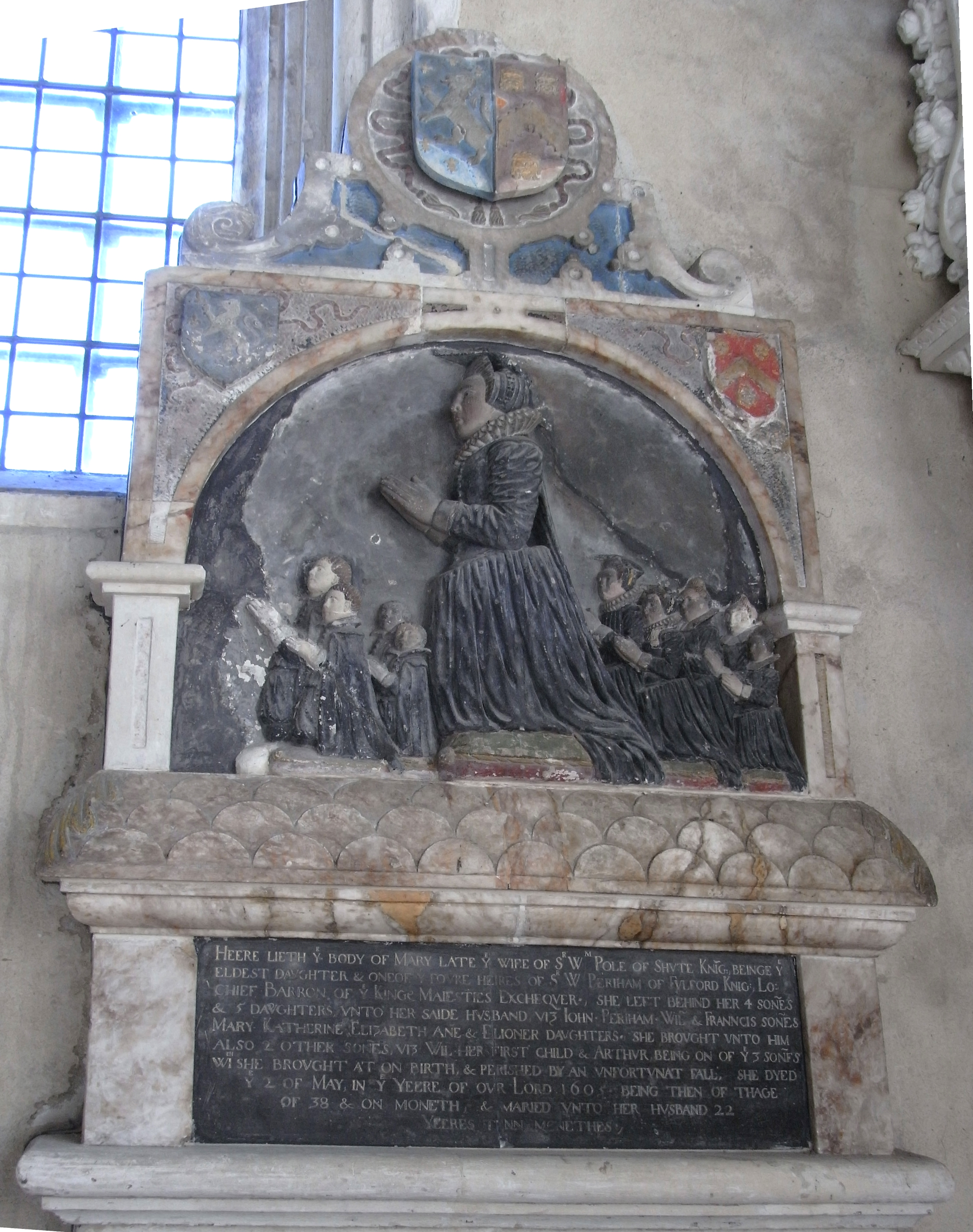
Monument to Mary Peryham, Colyton Church

Monument to Mary Periham (1567–1605), eldest daughter of Sir William Peryam and 1st wife of Sir William Pole (1561–1635), in the Pole Chapel, Colyton Church, Devon, in which parish is situated Colcombe Castle. The escutcheons show the arms of Pole and Peryam. Text: Heere lieth ye body of Mary late ye wife of Sr. Wm. Pole of Shute knig. beinge ye eldest daughter & one of ye foure heires of Sr. W. Periham of Fulford knig. Lo. Chief Barron of ye Kinge majesties Exchequer. She left behind her 4 son(n)es & 5 daughters unto her saide husband viz John, Periham, Wil., & Franncis, son(n)es, Mary, Katherine, Elizabeth, Ane & Elioner, daughters. She brought unto him also 2 other son(n)es viz Wil., her first child & Arthur being on(e) of ye 3 son(n)es wi.ch she brought at on(e) birth & perished by an unfortunat fall. She dyed ye 2 of May in ye yeere of our Lord 1605 being then of th'age of 38 & on(e) moneth & maried unto her husband 22 yeeres tenn monethes

==== Elizabeth Periham ====
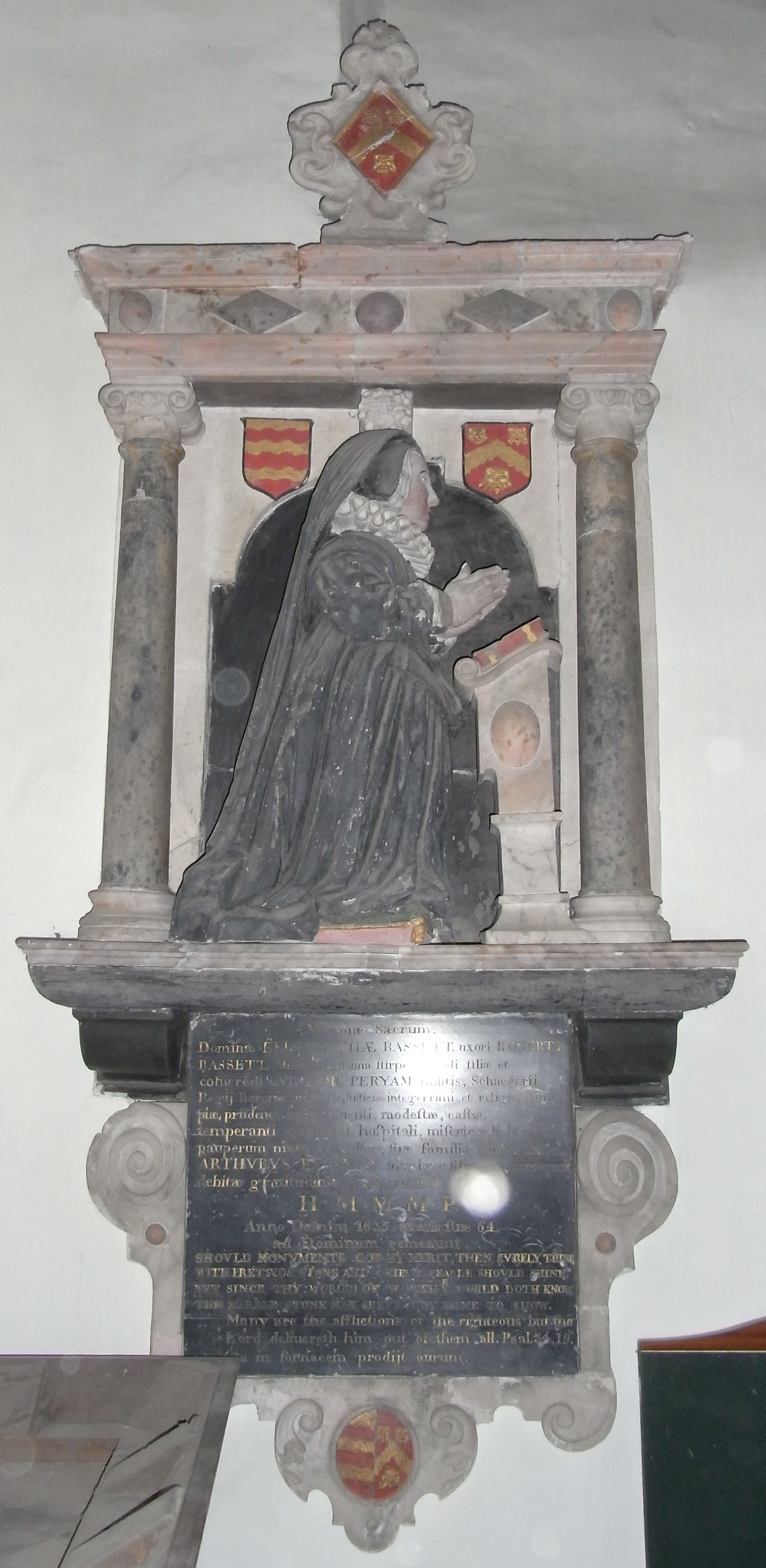
Monument to Elizabeth Peryam, Heanton Punchardon

A mural monument in Heanton Punchardon Church, Devon, to Elizabeth Peryam (1571–1635), daughter of Sir William Peryam and wife of Sir Robert Bassett. Within a lozenge at the top and on an escutcheon to the sinister are shown her paternal arms of Peryam: Gules, a chevron engrailed or between three lion's faces affrontes of the last. The arms of Peryam are also shown on an oval cartouche underneath, impaled by Bassett. The text is as follows:
Memoriae Sacrum
"Dominae Elizabethae Bassett uxori Roberti Bassett militis clarissima stirpe oriundi filiae et cohaeredi Gulielmi Peryam militis Schaccarii Regii Baronis primarii Judicic integerrimi et religiosissimi piae prudenti justae patienti modestae castae temperanti constanti hospitali misericordi beneficae pauperum matri et medicae suae familiae conservatrici. Arthurus Bassett armiger filius eius primogenit(us) debitae gratitudinis et observantiae ergo H(oc) M(onumentum) M(atri)? M(aerens) P(osuit) Anno Domini 1635 aetatis suae 64 ad Dominum remeaunt."
"Should monuments goe by merit then surely thine,
With pretious stone and orient pearle should shine,
But since the world of worth ye world doth know,
This marble stone may serve thy name to show."
"Many are the afflictions of the righteous but the Lord delivereth him out of them all". Psalms. 34.19.
"Ita in fornacem prodiit aurum"

Which may be translated literally into English as:

"Sacred to the memory to Lady Elizabeth Bassett wife of Robert Bassett, knight, arisen from a famous stock, daughter and co-heiress of William Peryam, knight, Lord Chief Justice of the Royal Treasury, (he was) most impartial and duty-bound, (she was) pious, prudent, just, long-suffering, modest, chaste, temperant, constant, hospitable, compassionate, kind, a mother and healer of the poor, a preserver of her own family. Arthur Bassett, Esquire, her sorrowing first-born son, of a duty of gratitude and respect therefore placed this monument to his mother in the year of Our Lord 1635 of her age 64 may she remain to the Lord...Thus does gold come forth into an oven".

== Death and burial ==
He died on 9 October 1604, in the year of his seventieth birthday, at his house at Little Fulford (renamed Shobroke Park in the early 1800s, demolished) east of Crediton in Devon. His monument exists in Crediton parish church to the north of the chancel, showing a life-like effigy of his recumbent figure his head propped up on his hand. He had served at the Exchequer for eleven years and nine months, and his funeral and burial in Crediton Church appears to have been a significant event, as it was well attended, according to Prince not only by "The gentry, clergy, and others in these parts, but also with heralds at arms, marshalling all according to their rank and place".

== Monument in Crediton Church ==
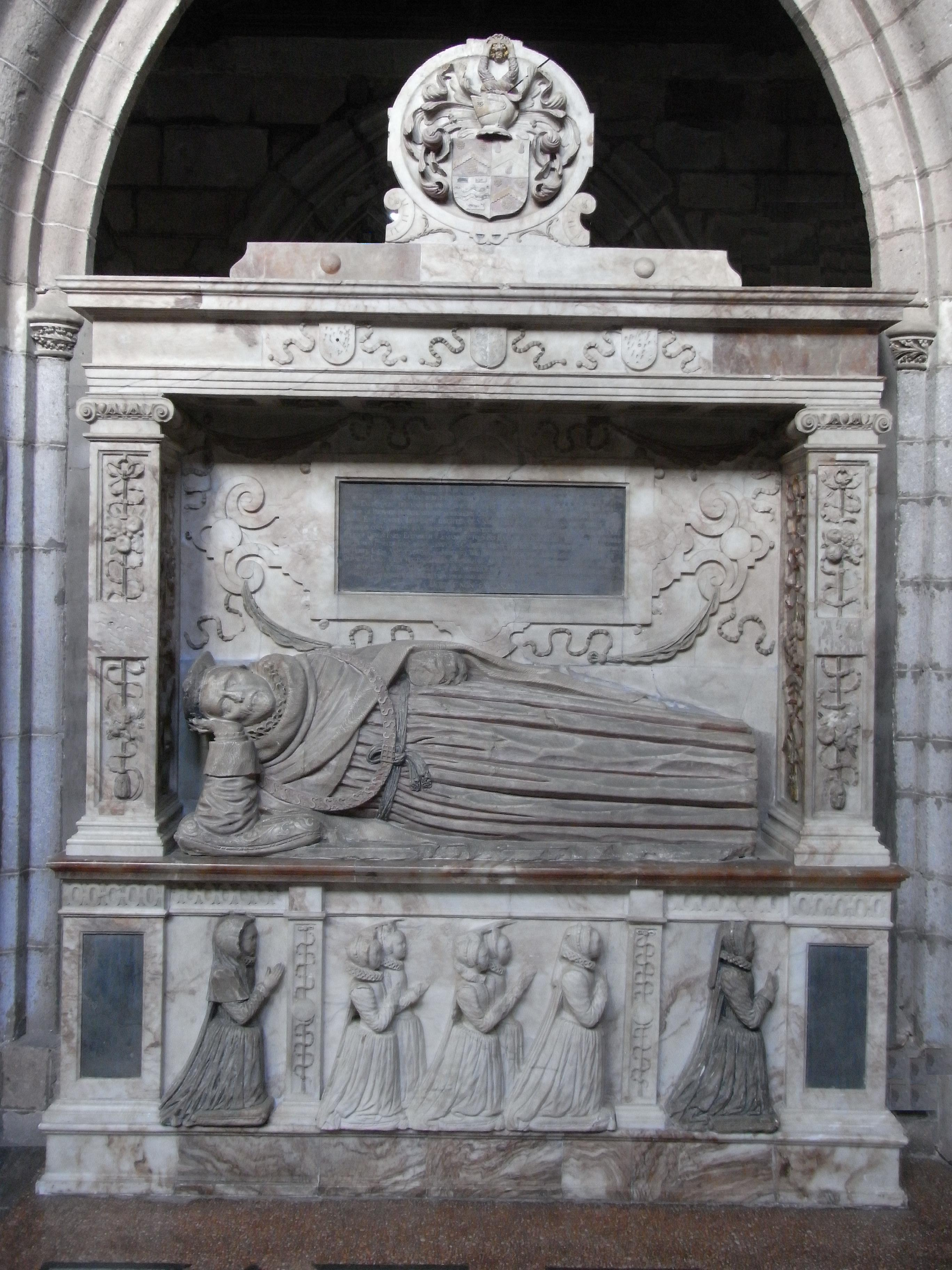
Monument to Sir William Peryham (1534–1604), Crediton Church, Devon; north side of chancel

His monument exists in the large and important parish church of Crediton, about two miles west of Little Fulford. It is situated to the north of the chancel, in the position of greatest honour, and shows a life-like effigy of his recumbent figure his head propped up on his hand. He wears a long Collar of Esses with a single portcullis, one of the badges of the Tudor monarchs. Underneath are shown sculpted in relief his three wives kneeling with his four daughters. The marble monument is decorated with ribbon-work and shows his heraldic achievement on top. The three heraldic escutcheons on the cornice have been defaced by blows from a chisel-like instrument and the armorials removed. The text inscribed on a tablet within a strapwork surround above the effigy is as follows:

Heere lyeth the body of Sr. William Peryam, knight, who in AD 1579 was made one of the justices of the Court of Comon Pleas & from thence in AD 1592 was called to bee Lord Cheefe Baron of the Exchequer. He married first Margery daughter & heir of Jo(hn) Holcott of Berk(shire) Esqr. widow of Richadr(sic) Hutchenson of Yorksheire Esqr.; secondly Anne daughter of John Parker of Devon Esqr.; lastly Elizabeth daughter of Sr. Nic(holas) Bacon knig. Lord Keeper of the Great Seale. Hee hadd only yssue by his second wife, 4 daughters & heires, viz, Mary theldest (sic) married to Sr. Will(iam) Pole of Devon knig.; Elizabeth the 2 married to Sr. Ro(bert) Bassett of Devon knig.; Jane the 3 first married to Thomas Poyntz Esqr. son & heir of Sr. Gabriell Poyntz of Ess(ex) knig.; afterward to Tho(mas) Docwra of Hertf(ordshire) Esqr.; Anne the youngest married to Will(iam) Williams Esq. son & heir of Sr. Jo(hn) Williams of Dorsett knig. All wch. his daughters & heirs have yssu now lyvinge by their severall husbands. He dyed 9 octo(ber) Ao.Do. 1605 (sic) in the 70the yeere of his age much & worthely reverenced for his religeous zeale, integrity & profound knowledge in the lawes of the realme. Dormit non-est mortuus (he sleeps, he is not dead)

== Armorials ==
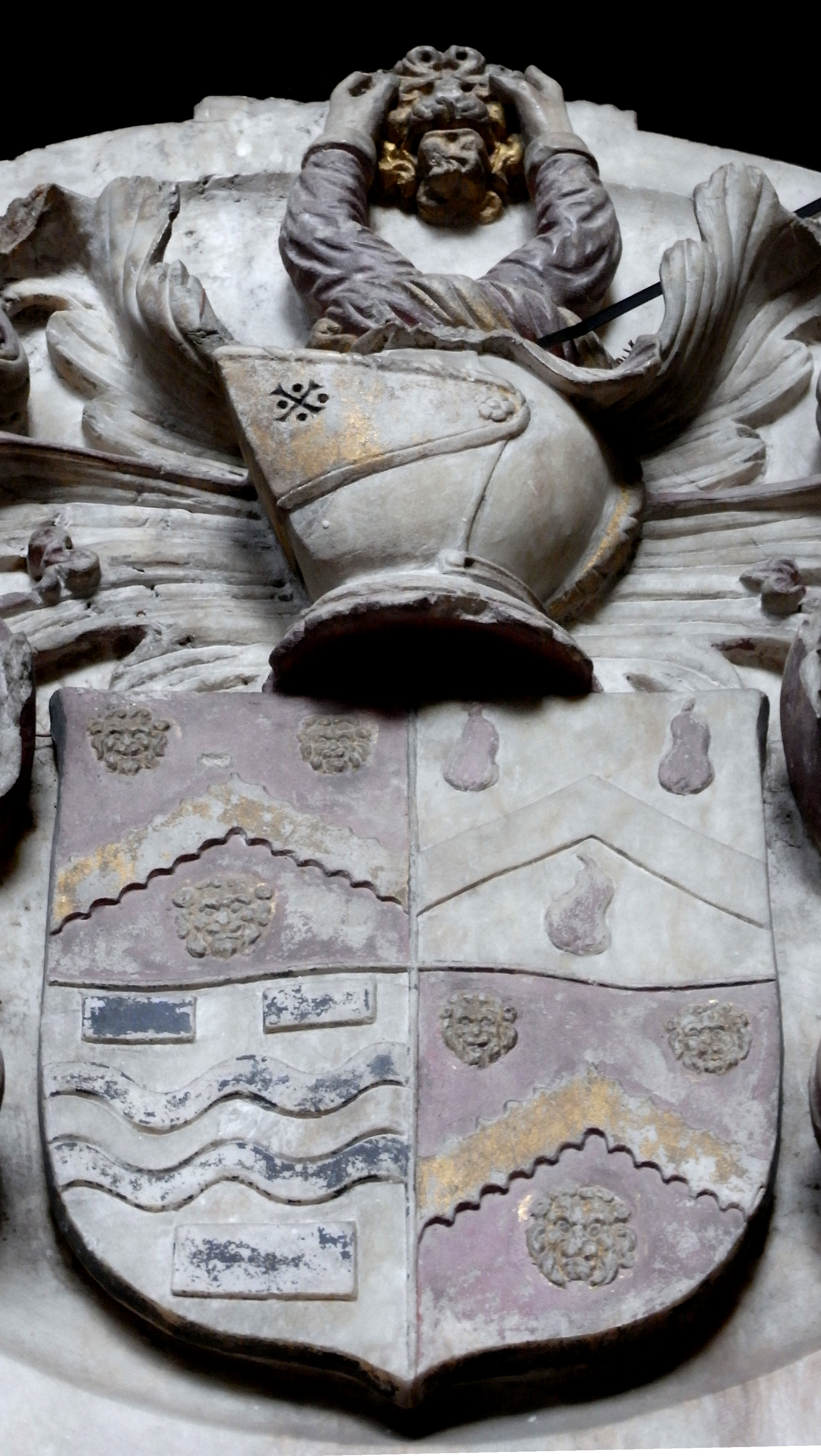
Heraldic achievement of Sir William Peryam (died 1604) atop his monument in Crediton Church

The heraldic achievement on top of the monument to Sir William Peryam in Crediton Church show the following: Quarterly, 1st & 4th: Gules, a chevron engrailed between three leopards' faces or (Peryam modern, formerly Branch); 2nd: Argent, a chevron between three pears sable(?) (Peryam ancient); 3rd: Argent, two bars wavy between three billets sable (Hone of Ottery). The arms of a chevron engrailed between three leopards' faces were according to Prince's "Worthies of Devon" (1710) originally the arms of the family of Branch, "whose heir was married to Periam, of which family the ancient arms were argent, a chevron between four (sic) pears sable". These ancient arms of Peryham appear therefore to be canting arms playing on the Latin pirum (pear) and its derivative "perry" the drink made from pears. It would appear therefore that one of the younger sons of this marriage, the ancestor of Sir William, was required to adopt the arms of his mother's family, expired in the male line, in lieu of his paternal arms in order to inherit his maternal lands. Such cases were very common, from the earliest times. The crest of Peryham is: Two arms gules, issuing out of a crown or, holding in the hands proper a leopard's face of the second.

== Notes ==
Legal offices
| Preceded by Sir Roger Manwood | Lord Chief Baron of the Exchequer; 1593–1604 | Succeeded by Sir Thomas Fleming |
