= Cressey (surname) =

Cressey is a surname. Notable people with the surname include:

- Donald Cressey (1919–1987), American penologist, sociologist, and criminologist
- George Cressey, American geographer, author, and academic
- Roger W. Cressey, former member of the United States National Security Council staff
