= HMS Cressy =

Four ships of the Royal Navy have borne the name HMS Cressy, after the Battle of Crécy.

- HMS Cressy (1810) was a 74-gun third rate launched in 1810 and broken up in 1832.
- HMS Cressy (1853) was an 80-gun screw propelled third rate launched in 1853 and sold in 1867.
- HMS Cressy (1899) was a Cressy-class armoured cruiser launched in 1899 and sunk by a U-boat in 1914.
- HMS Cressy was the name given to the 46-gun fifth rate HMS Unicorn between 1941 and 1959 while she was serving as a drill ship for the Royal Naval Reserve. She was handed over for preservation in 1968.
