= Edward Bolton =

English-born judge (1592–1659)

Sir Edward Bolton (1592–1659) was an English-born judge who served for many years as Solicitor General for Ireland before succeeding his father Sir Richard Bolton as Chief Baron of the Irish Exchequer.

He was the only surviving son of Richard Bolton and his first wife Frances Walter, daughter of Richard Walter. He was born in England, probably at the family home at Fenton, Staffordshire. He was baptised on 5 October 1592 in St Mary's Church, Stafford. His father moved to Ireland when Edward was twelve. He graduated from Trinity College Dublin, then attended Clement's Inn and Lincoln's Inn, and was called to the Bar in 1616. When still only thirty, on 5 December 1623 he was made Solicitor General for Ireland and held that office for seventeen years. He was knighted in Dublin in 1636 by Thomas Wentworth, 1st Earl of Strafford, Lord Deputy of Ireland. Strafford was for several years almost all-powerful in Ireland, and Edward's father was one of his strongest supporters. When his father became Lord Chancellor of Ireland in 1639, Edward was appointed Chief Baron in his place, and frequently went as a judge on the Northwestern Circuit. The troubles of the English Civil War led to the attainder and execution of their patron Strafford, his father's impeachment and his own removal from office. He spent the years 1642–44 in England. However, in time he made his peace with Oliver Cromwell, and acted as a judge of the High Court of Justice in 1652–3. He died in 1659 and was buried in St. Bride's Church, Dublin.

In 1637 he was granted the estate of Lissenhall near Dublin; he also acquired the manor of Bective, County Meath. His principal residence was Brazil (or Brazeel) House, near Swords, County Dublin, which was largely destroyed by fire in 1810, although some ruins survived until 1978.

He married Isabella Ayloffe, daughter of William Ayloffe, serjeant-at-law, of Essex. They had four children, Nicholas, Edward, Anne, and Mary. Nicholas's descendants remained at Brazil until 1810. Anne, through her second husband Alexander Pigott, was an ancestor of the Pigott Baronets. Dudley Loftus, the noted Orientalist, married one of Edward's granddaughters, Frances Nagle, daughter of Mary Bolton. Isabella died in 1674.
