= Crecy Hill =

Local nature reserve in Oxfordshire, England

Coordinates: 51.887°N 1.300°W

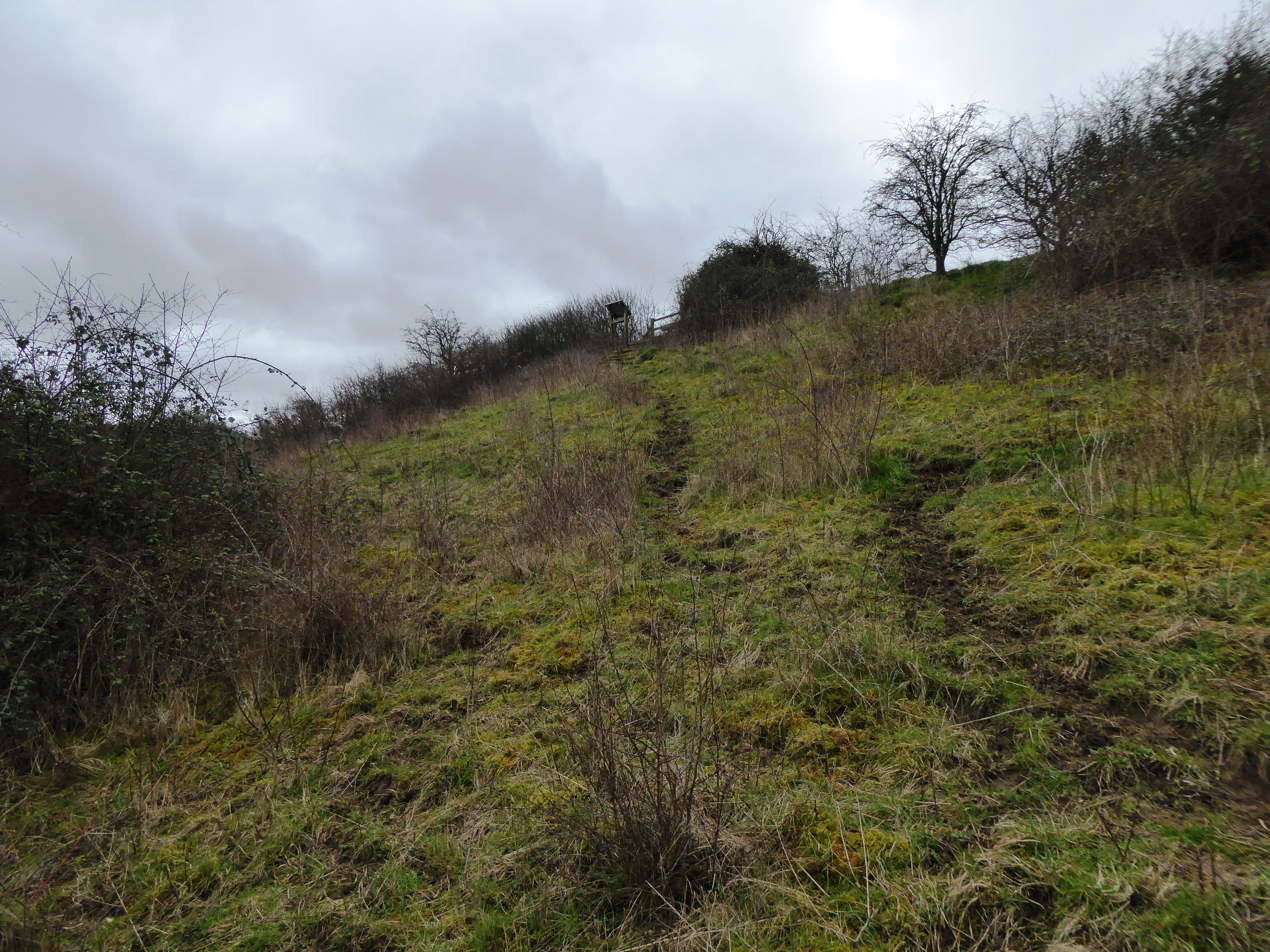
- Interactive map of Crecy Hill
- Type: Local Nature Reserve
- Location: Tackley, Oxfordshire
- OS grid: SP 483 212
- Area: 0.8 hectares (2.0 acres)
- Manager: Tackley Parish Council

Crecy Hill is a 0.8-hectare (2.0-acre) Local Nature Reserve north of Tackley in Oxfordshire. It is owned by Oxford County Council and managed by Tackley Parish Council.

This steeply sloping limestone bank has a calcareous grassland habitat. More than 100 wild flower species and 15 grasses have been recorded. There are also more than 100 insect species, including 20 butterflies such as the small blue.

As of March 2020, the main entrance is padlocked, but there is access at the southern end of the site.
