= Thomas Bavand =

Judge of Ireland that never ruled

Thomas Bavand (1600–1643) was an English barrister, who was appointed a judge in Ireland, but died before he could take up his office.

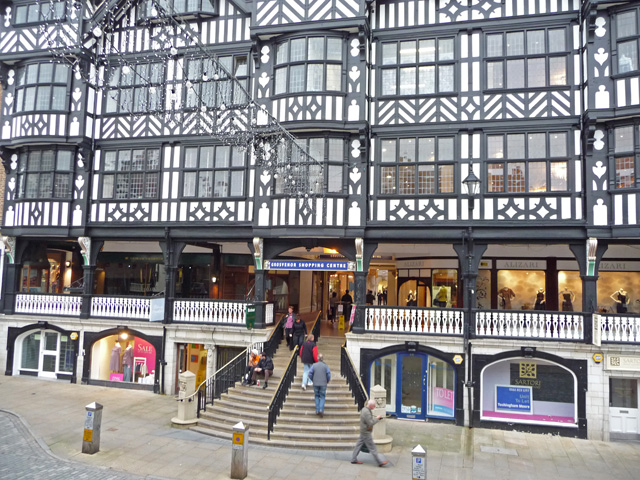
Chester, present day: the Bavands were a prominent and long-established Chester family

He was born in Chester, where the Bavands were a numerous and prosperous family, related to other leading families of the city like the Gamulls. He may have been a grandson of Richard Bavand, (Mayor of Chester in 1581 and 1600 and MP for Chester in the Parliament of 1584,) who died in 1603, survived by several children by his wife Jane Bannvile. Thomas had some interest in genealogy and had a family pedigree drawn up.

From his deposition in the libel case of Done v Babington, it is reasonably certain that Thomas was born in 1600. He entered the University of Oxford in 1614 and graduated from Broadgates Hall (renamed Pembroke College shortly afterwards) in 1618. He entered Clifford's Inn, was called to the bar at the Inner Temple in 1632, and built up a flourishing practice. He owned several properties in Chester, and his name appears as lessor on two leases of houses in the city. He was chosen to be a judge of the Court of King's Bench (Ireland) in 1643, but died almost at once.

He was married, but it is not known if he had any children. His wife was a distant cousin of Sir Ralph Done of Tarvin, Cheshire. When Done sued Henry Babington, a respected London silk merchant (who employed Sir Ralph's son) for libel in 1639, Bavand filed a deposition on behalf of Sir Ralph, which gives some useful information about his own life. He later acted as mediator between the parties, at the suggestion of Babington. It seems that neither side wished to proceed to a final hearing in the matter: Done withdrew his claim and agreed to pay half the legal costs of the action.

== Sources ==
- Ball, F. Elrington The Judges in Ireland 1221-1921 London John Murray 1926
- Done v Babington Court of Chivalry 1639/40
- Smyth, Constantine Joseph Chronicle of the Law Officers of Ireland London Butterworths 1839
