= Black Assize of Oxford 1577 =

Mass death by disease in England

The Black Assize is a name given to multiple deaths in the city of Oxford in England between 6 July and 12 August 1577. At least 300 people, including the chief baron and sheriff, are thought to have died as a result of this event. It received its name because it was believed to have been associated with a trial at the Assize Court at Oxford Castle.

== Casualties ==
Reports vary as to the total number of deaths that occurred in the "Black Assize". The casualties in Oxford itself are consistently recorded as approximately 300, but some reports say that further deaths occurred outside the city. One report records:

There died in Oxford 300 persons, and sickened there, but died in other places, 200 and odd, from the 6th of July to the 12th of August, after which day died not one of that sickness, for one of them infected not another, nor any one woman or child died thereof.

This reported lack of deaths among women and children led to speculation about the causes of the casualties.

== Possible causes ==
On the wall inside the Main Hall of the Old County Hall of Oxfordshire in New Road, an inscription reads:

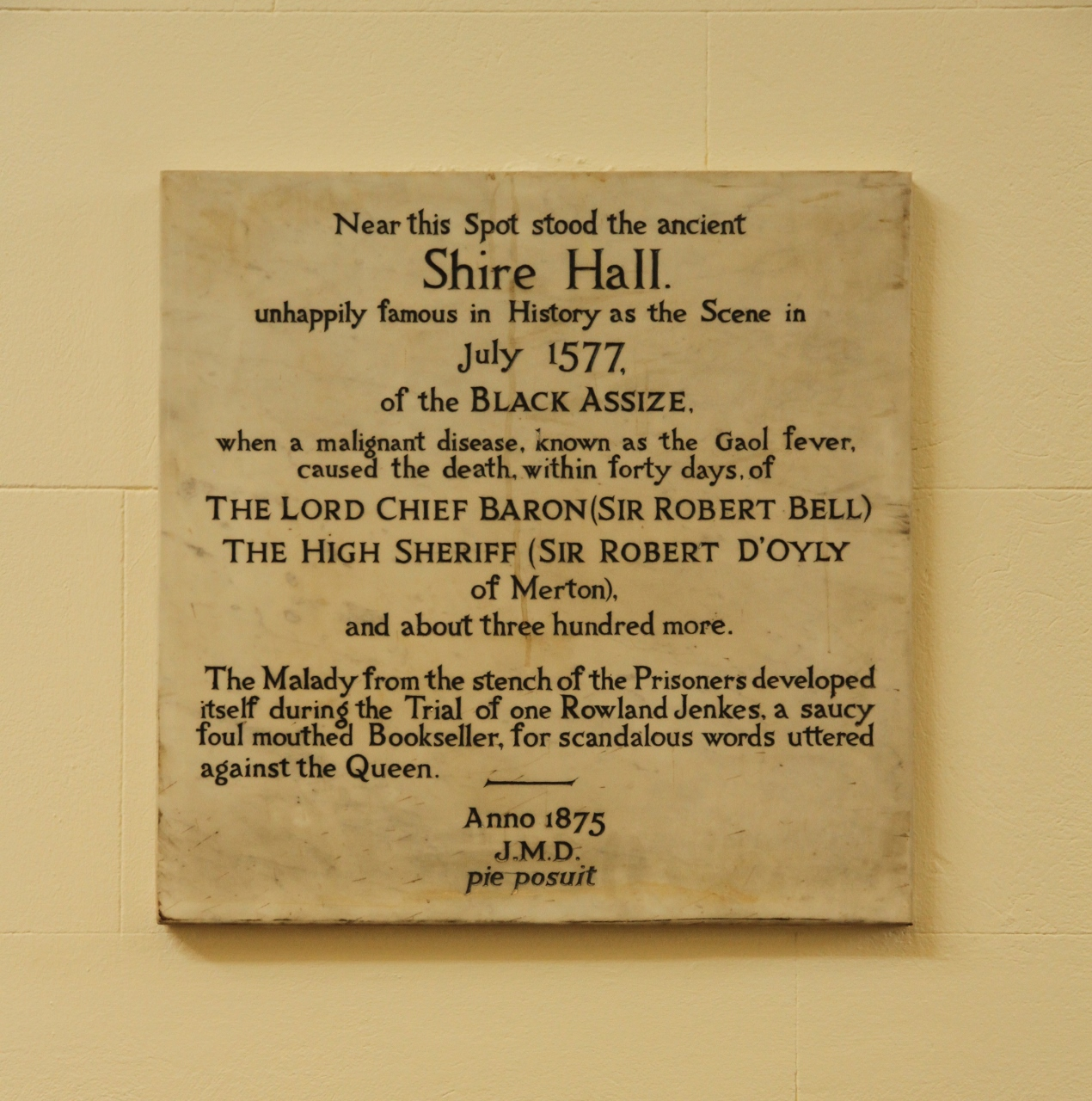
Plaque on a wall inside County Hall

Near this spot stood the ancient Shire Hall, unhappily famous in history as the scene in July 1577 of the Black Assize, when a malignant disease known as Gaol Fever caused the death within forty days of the Lord Chief Baron of the Exchequer, Sir Robert Bell, the Lord High Sheriff (Sir Robert D'Oyly of Merton) and about three hundred more.

The malady from the stench of the Prisoners developed itself during the Trial of one Rowland Jenkes, a saucy foul-mouthed Bookseller, for scandalous words uttered against the Queen.

Anno 1875. JMD pie posuit. (Year 1875. JMD piously erected [this monument].)

From the time of the Black Death in the mid-14th century until the second half of the 19th century, Oxford was regularly visited by plague, cholera, smallpox and typhoid fevers. In 1348, the Black Death reduced the city's population to such an extent that Gloucester College (from which Gloucester Green derives its name) was forced to close. In 1571, Oxford University had to postpone the start of term because of an outbreak of plague, and the 'gaol fever' six years later may have been part of the same epidemic, being considered more worthy of note because its victims included the Lord Chief Baron and the Lord High Sheriff.

This account of disease is reflected in a number of sources.

An early Chronicle records:

The Court were surprised with a pestilent savour, whether arising from the noisome smell of the prisoners, or from the damp of the ground, is uncertain; but all that were present, within forty hours died, except the prisoners, and the women and children; and the contagion went no farther.

A 19th-century account is more sure of the cause:

The assize held at Oxford in the year 1577, called the "Black Assize," was a dreadful instance of the deadly effects of the jail fever. The judges, jury, witnesses, nay, in fact every person, except the prisoners, women and children, in court were killed by a foul air, which at first was thought to have arisen out of the bowels of the earth; but that great philosopher, Lord Bacon, proved it to have come from the prisoners taken out of a noisome jail and brought into court to take their trials; and they alone, inhaling foul air, were not injured by it.

Other accounts reject the notion of disease as a cause:

it could not be a prison infection; for that would have manifested itself by smell, or operating sooner. But to take away all scruple, and to assign the true cause, it was thus: It fortuned that a manuscript fell into my hands, collected by an ancient gentleman of York, who was a great observer and gatherer of strange things and facts, who lived about the time of this accident happening at Oxford, wherein it is related thus: "That Rowland Jenkes, being imprisoned for treasonable words, spoken against the queen, and being a popish recusant, had, notwithstanding, during the time of his restraint, liberty some time to walk abroad with a keeper; and that one day he came to an apothecary, and showed him a receipt which he desired him to make up; but the apothecary, upon view of it, told him, that it was a strong and dangerous receipt, and required some time to prepare it; but also asked him to what use he would apply it. He answered, to kill the rats, that, since his imprisonment, spoiled his books; so being satisfied, he promised to make it ready. After a certain time he cometh to know if it were ready; but the apothecary said, the ingredients were so hard to procure, that he had not done it, and so gave him the receipt again, of which he had taken a copy, which mine author had there precisely written down, but did seem so horribly poisonous, that I cut it forth, lest it might fall into the hands of wicked persons. But after, it seems, he had it prepared, and, against the day of his trial, had made a wick of it (for so is the word, that is, so fitted, that like a candle it might be fired) which, as soon as ever he was condemned, he lighted, having provided himself a tinder-box, and steel to strike fire. And whosoever should know the ingredients of that wick, or candle, and the manner of the composition, will easily be persuaded of the virulency and venomous effect of it."

Further accounts merely attribute the deaths to a curse supposedly uttered by Rowland Jenkes.

== Popular culture ==
The Black Assizes has featured as a display at Oxford Castle and is a regular feature of Oxford ghost tours, where the story of Rowland Jenkes' curse is given prominence.

The events of this time are part of the backdrop to the historical crime novel Heresy by S. J. Parris in which Rowland Jenkes appears as a character.

== See also ==
- Black Assize of Exeter 1586
