= Serenus de Cressy =

English Anglican priest, later Benedictine scholar

Dom Serenus Cressy, O.S.B. (originally born Hugh Paulinus de Cressy; c. 1605 – 10 August 1674) was an English convert to Catholicism and Benedictine monk, who became a noted scholar in Church history.

== Life ==
=== Anglican chaplain ===
Hugh Paulinus de Cressy was born at Thorpe Salvin, Yorkshire, about 1605, the son of Hugh de Cressy, barrister of Lincoln's Inn, and later a justice of the Court of King's Bench (Ireland), and Margery d'Oylie of London, daughter of Thomas D'Oylie, a highly regarded doctor and scholar of Spanish (and a close connection by marriage of Francis Bacon), and his wife Anne Perrott of North Leigh. Educated first at Wakefield Grammar school, when fourteen years old he went to Oxford, where he took the degree of B.A. in 1623 and that of M.A. in 1627. He attended, and became a fellow of Merton College, earning his Master's degree in theology the following year.

Having taken Anglican orders, after leaving Oxford he served as chaplain to Thomas Wentworth, 1st Earl of Strafford, and then to Lucius Cary, 3rd Viscount Falkland, whom Cressy accompanied to Ireland in 1638. His father had gone to Ireland five years earlier to serve as a High Court judge, and was on good terms with Strafford. During his stay in Ireland, Cressy was appointed as Dean of Leighlin, but returned to England in 1639. Through the noble connections he had made while chaplain to Viscount Falkland he received the post of canon in the collegiate chapter of Windsor, Berkshire, in 1642, but was not able to occupy the position due to the troubled times England was experiencing then.

=== Roman Catholic Benedictine ===
After his patron, Lord Falkland, was killed in battle in 1643, Cressy went into the service of Charles Berkeley, who later was to become the 1st Earl of Falmouth. For some time he travelled abroad as tutor to Lord Falmouth, through the countries of Roman Catholic Europe, where he was exposed to the life and thought of that faith. Upon arriving in Rome in 1646, Cressy made the decision to enter the Roman Catholic Church. George Henry Tavard believes this decision was hastened by events of the English Civil War which brought Cressy to exile in France, where a number of Anglican High-Church adherents found French Catholicism not far from their own sympathies. Cressy took exception to the Protestant emphasis on scripture alone without authoritative interpretation. At this point he traveled to Paris to take instruction from the Reverend Henry Holden, an English theologian at the Sorbonne. He then published his most noted work, the Exomologesis, wherein he explained the motives which led him to change his religion. In some ways Cressy's views on Tradition prefigure John Henry Newman's observations in his 1845 Essay on the Development of Christian Doctrine.

When he had become a Roman Catholic, Cressy considered entering the Carthusians, but eventually opted to join the Benedictine Order, which he did in 1648. He was so poor, however, that Queen Henrietta Maria had to give him money for the journey. He then entered the novitiate of the English Congregation of Benedictines, which was based in Douai, France and was given the name of Serenus, by which he is now known. He professed monastic vows on 22 August 1649.

He was ordained a Catholic priest in 1651. That same year he was sent to serve as chaplain to the monastery of English Benedictine nuns, then still in Paris. While there he began his work on the text of Julian of Norwich. Returning to his own monastery in Douai, he undertook an extensive study of the history of monasticism in England. He also translated several works by various English mystical writers across a span of centuries.

Cressy was assigned to return to England in 1660 to serve as one of the chaplains to Queen Catherine of Braganza, wife of King Charles II of England and a Roman Catholic. For four years he resided at Somerset House, which served as her official residence. Cressy also spent time at Ditchley park owing to his friendship with Anne, countess of Rochester who was grandmother to Charles II son in law Edward Henry Lee. He was involved in theological controversies with Bishop George Worley of Worcester and Edward Stillingfleet. He then went to provide spiritual care to the Catholic Caryll family and died at East Grinstead, Sussex on 10 August 1674.

He is described as a quick and accurate disputant, a man of good nature and manners, and no inconsiderable preacher. He is also said to have been particularly temperate in controversy.

== Works ==
Cressy published his Exomologesis (Paris, 1647), or account of his conversion; it was valued by Roman Catholics as an answer to William Chillingworth's attacks.

Cressy's major work, The Church History of Brittany (i.e. Britain) from the beginning of Christianity to the Norman Conquest (1st vol. only published, Rouen, 1668), gives an exhaustive account of the foundation of monasteries during the Saxon heptarchy, and asserts that they followed the Benedictine Rule, differing in this respect from many historians. The work was criticized by Lord Clarendon, but defended by Anthony à Wood in his Athenae Oxoniensis, who supports Cressy's statement that it was compiled from original manuscripts and from the Annales Ecclesiae of Michael Alford, William Dugdale's Monasticon, and the Decem Scriptores Historiae Anglicanae.

The second part of the history, which has never been printed, was discovered at Douai in 1856. Cressy also edited Walter Hilton's Scale of Perfection (London, 1659); Dom Augustine Baker's Sancta Sophia (2 vols, Douai, 1657); and Julian of Norwich's Sixteen Revelations on the Love of God (1670). These books might have been lost but for Cressy's zeal.

For a complete list of Cressy's works see Joseph Gillow's Bibliographical Dictionary of the English Catholics, vol. I.

There is a lengthy speech attributed to Cressy in Joseph Henry Shorthouse's novel, John Inglesant.
