= Greenlands, Buckinghamshire =

House in Hambleden, Buckinghamshire, England

Coordinates: 51.5631°N 0.8825°W

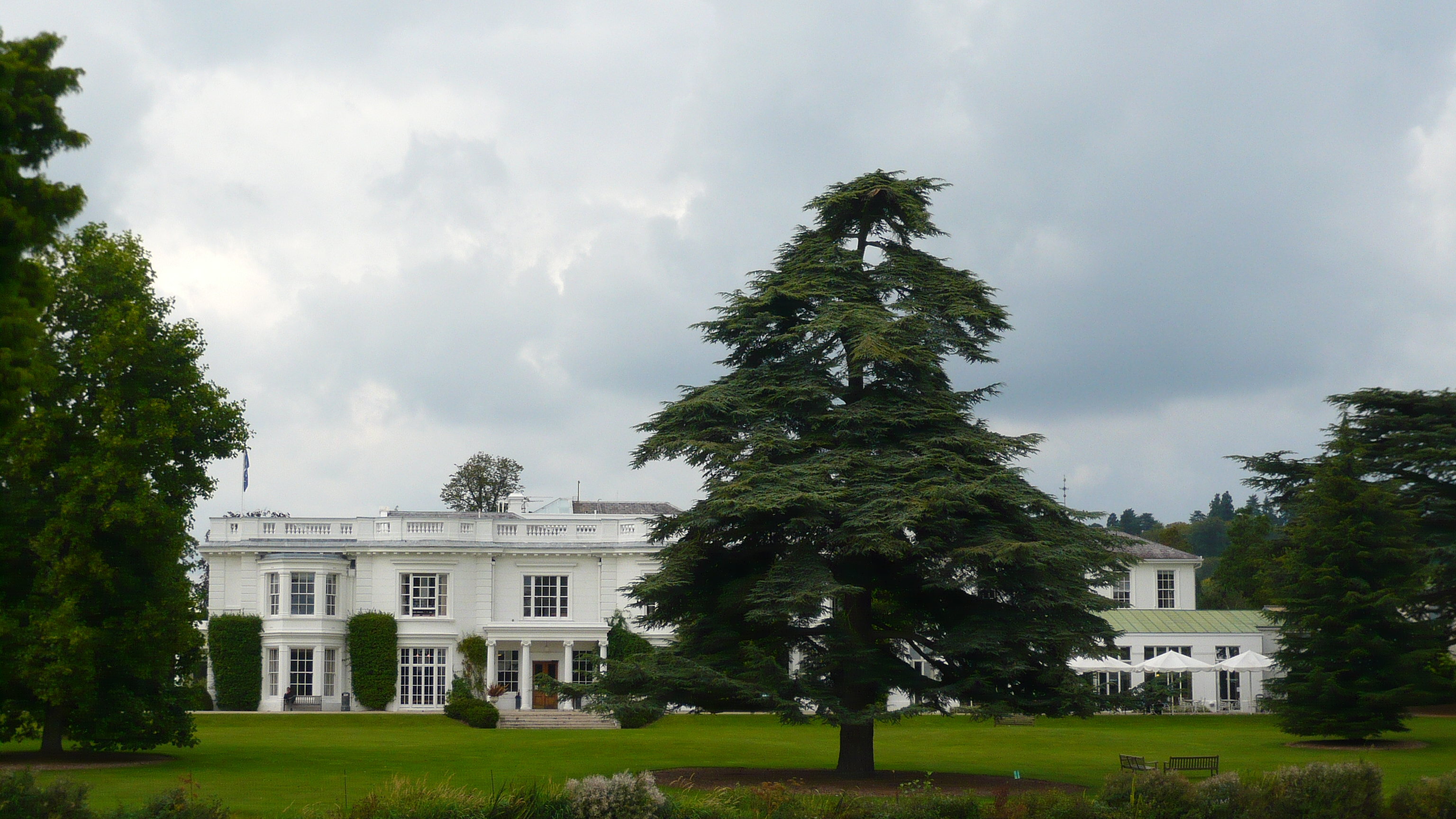
Greenlands, home to Henley Business School

Greenlands is a country house situated by the River Thames in Buckinghamshire, just outside Henley-on-Thames. Built in the nineteenth century, it now forms the core of Greenlands Campus of the University of Reading, and is used by their Henley Business School as the base for its MBA and corporate learning offerings. It has been a Grade II* listed building since 1992.

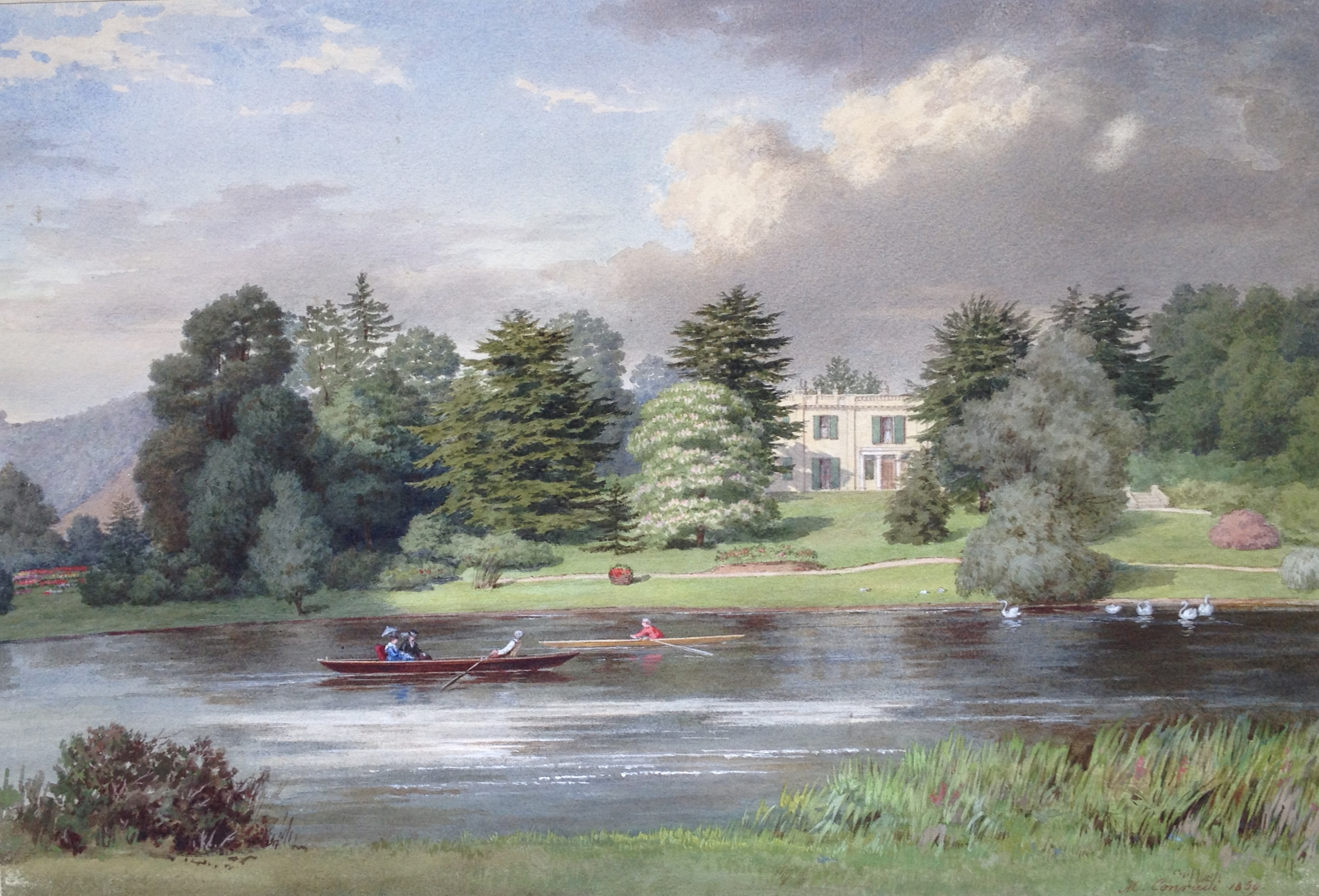
Painting of Greenlands about 1869

== History ==
The present building was built on the site of a previous house which was owned in the seventeenth century by the D'Oyley family, descendants of the Norman Robert D'Oyly. In the early nineteenth century, the land was owned by Thomas Darby-Coventry and a house called Greenland Lodge was built.

The next owner, Edward Marjoribanks a senior partner in Coutts Banks, bought the house in 1852, enlarged it and it was sold in 1868 on his death. It was bought by William Henry Smith, son of the founder of W H Smith. He further extended the building, though its appearance received a cool reception from Jerome K. Jerome who joked in Three Men in a Boat that it was ‘the rather uninteresting-looking river residence of my newsagent.’ On Smith's death, his family was ennobled with the title of Viscount Hambleden. Greenlands remained their home until immediately after the Second World War.

In 1946, the 3rd Viscount rented the building to the Administrative Staff College, an initiative designed to provide management education to British men and women in all sectors of the economy and government. The Smith family moved into the village of Hambleden. Meanwhile, the Administrative Staff College opened to course members in March 1948. In 1952, following the death of Viscount Hambleden, the house was bought by the college. The Administrative Staff College was renamed Henley Management College in 1991, when it received its Royal Charter. In 2008 it merged with the Business School of the University of Reading, to form the new Henley Business School.
