= Elizabeth Wallop, Countess of Portsmouth =

English aristocrat

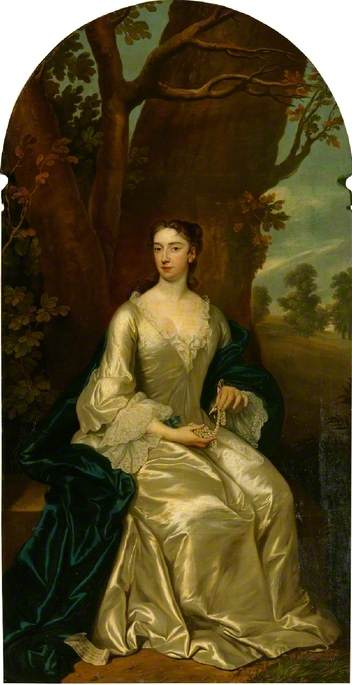
- Born: Elizabeth Griffin; November 30, 1691; Dingley, Northamptonshire
- Died: August 13, 1762 (aged 70)
- Other name: Elizabeth Grey (1720-1741)
- Known for: Owner of Audley End House

Elizabeth Wallop, Countess of Portsmouth (30 November 1691 – 13 August 1762), born Elizabeth Griffin and called Elizabeth Grey in her first marriage, was an English aristocrat.

== Background ==
Wallop was born Elizabeth Griffin, eldest daughter of James Griffin and Anne Raynsford at Dingley, Northamptonshire, and baptised 30 November 1691. Her father succeeded as 2nd Baron Griffin of Braybrooke in 1710 but did not use the title; her younger brother Edward became the 3rd and last Baron Griffin. Her paternal grandparents were Edward, 1st Baron Griffin of Braybrooke, and Essex Howard, daughter of the 3rd Earl of Suffolk. Her maternal grandparents were Richard Raynsford and Anne Neville, daughter of Richard Neville of Billingbear in Berkshire. Her father and maternal grandfather had both been members of parliament.

== Marriages ==
On 14 May 1720 Elizabeth married her cousin, whig member of parliament Henry Grey, who had changed his name from Henry Neville in 1706 to satisfy the terms of the will of his maternal uncle, Ralph Grey, 4th Baron Grey of Werke. The marriage was childless, and Henry's nephew Richard Neville Aldworth (the son of his sister Catherine) expected to inherit the Neville family estates in Berkshire on his uncle's death. He was disappointed. When Henry Grey died in 1740, he left all his personal property and lighthouses at Winterton in Norfolk and Orford Ness in Suffolk to Elizabeth. His real estate, including Billingbear House in Berkshire and a house in London, was left to Elizabeth during her lifetime, and then to go to his nephew on her death. The will led to gossip that Elizabeth had had an undue influence on her husband over his will. Within less than a year, on 9 June 1741, Elizabeth remarried, this time to widower John Wallop, Viscount Lymington. She became countess of Portsmouth when her husband was created earl in 1743.

== Audley End ==
The Griffin family seat, Dingley Hall in Dingley, Northamptonshire, had been sold by Elizabeth's nephew Edward Griffin, but a new opportunity for acquiring a family estate presented itself in 1745, when the 10th earl of Suffolk died without leaving a will. The title passed to his second cousin once removed, the 4th earl of Berkshire, while, under a deed of settlement made by the 7th earl of Suffolk in 1721, the estate, including Audley End House, went to distant kinsman Thomas Howard, 2nd Earl of Effingham. Elizabeth's solicitor, John Sanderson, then discovered a previous settlement made by James Howard, 3rd Earl of Suffolk in 1687 that, in the event of the failure of the male line of himself and his brothers, provided for the property to revert to the descendants of his daughters, Essex Griffin and Elizabeth Felton. In 1747 the Court of Chancery decided the case in favour of Elizabeth and her sister Ann Whitwell (granddaughters of Essex Griffin) and Lord Hervey (great-grandson of Elizabeth Felton). Audley End House and park were excluded from the award, as they had been in the possession of the king in 1687, but were purchased by Elizabeth from Lord Effingham in 1751 for £10,000.

When Elizabeth bought Audley End House, it was in a dilapidated state and she carried out a programme of demolition and restoration on the advice of the London builders John Phillips and George Shakespear. The east side of the court, including the long gallery, was demolished and the eastern ends of the north and south ranges reduced to one storey. With the Audley End estate came the hereditary right to nominate the master of Magdalene College, Cambridge, and in 1760 she appointed George Sandby to the position.

== Legacy ==
Elizabeth died on 13 August 1762. In her will, she left the lighthouses and the Audley End estate to her nephew John Griffin Griffin (formerly Whitwell), and Billingbear House to her first husband's nephew Richard Neville Aldworth, who was also Elizabeth's second cousin. Audley End was to revert to Richard Nevlle Aldworth and his male heirs if John Griffin Griffin died without a male heir (as turned out to be the case). Provision was also made for her sister Ann and daughters, and for a cousin, Jane James. A Captain Savile also received a legacy. Elizabeth's husband, the earl of Portsmouth, who outlived her by only a few months, received a pearl necklace he had given her and the use of her London house in Savile Row for his lifetime. She was buried in the church of Waltham St Lawrence, where her first husband was buried.

Three portraits of Elizabeth are displayed at Audley End: one by Michael Dahl; one by Charles Jervas; one by Thomas Hudson. The first two were painted when she was Elizabeth Grey; the third when she was Countess of Portsmouth.

In 1774 John Griffin Griffin erected an obelisk in memory of Elizabeth to the north of Audley End House.
