= John Griffin, 4th Baron Howard de Walden =

British Army officer, politician and peer

Field Marshal The Right Honourable The Lord Howard de Walden KB
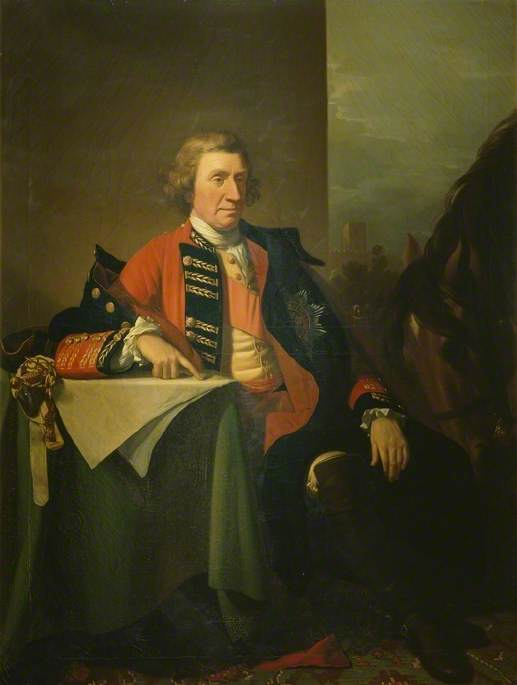
- John Griffin, 4th Baron Howard de Walden
- Born: John Griffin Whitwell; 13 March 1719; Oundle, Northamptonshire
- Died: 25 May 1797 (aged 78); Audley End House, Essex
- Burial place: St Mary the Virgin, Saffron Walden
- Military career
- Allegiance: Kingdom of Great Britain
- Branch: British Army
- Service years: 1739–1797
- Rank: Field Marshal
- Conflicts: War of the Austrian Succession; Seven Years' War
- Awards: Knight Companion of the Order of the Bath

Field Marshal John Griffin Griffin, 4th Baron Howard de Walden, 1st Baron Braybrooke, KB (13 March 1719 – 25 May 1797), was a British Army officer, politician and peer. He served as a junior officer with the Pragmatic Army in the Dutch Republic and Germany during the War of the Austrian Succession. He commanded a brigade at the Battle of Corbach and the Battle of Warburg in July 1760 during the Seven Years' War. He was wounded at the Battle of Kloster Kampen and retired from active service. Born John Whitwell, he changed his name to Griffin in 1749 under the terms of a settlement from his aunt, the countess of Portsmouth, from whom he inherited Audley End House in 1762. He held the seat of Andover in the House of Commons from 1749 to 1784, when he was elevated to the House of Lords as 4th Baron Howard de Walden. In 1789 he received the further title of 1st Baron Braybrooke. He was married twice but had no children.

== Background and early life ==
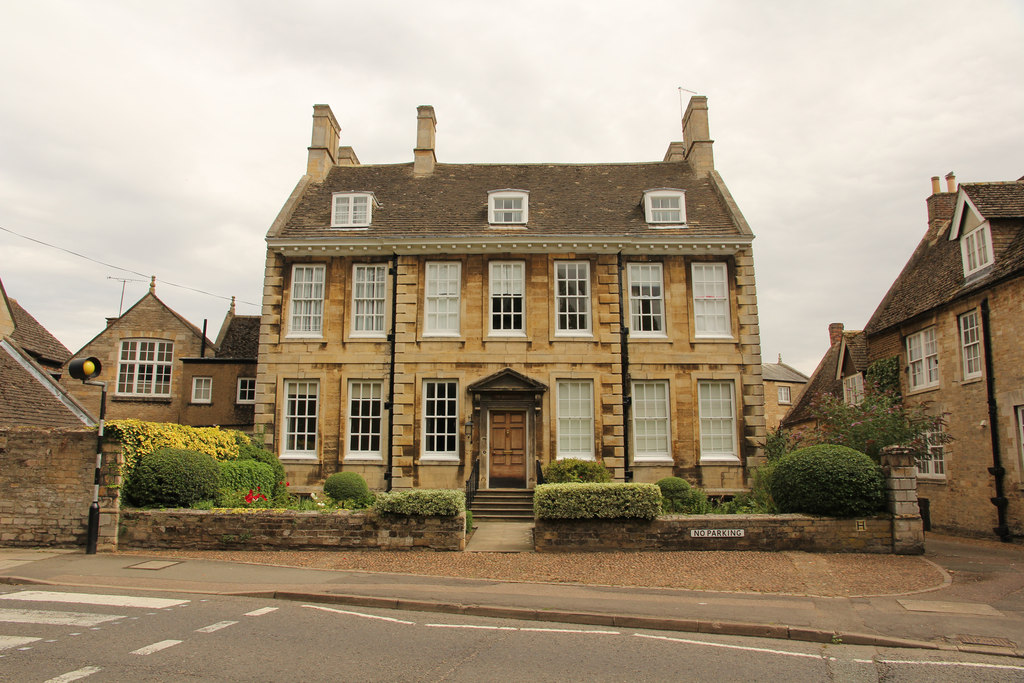
Berrystead, Oundle

Griffin was born John Griffin Whitwell in Oundle, Northamptonshire, on 13 March 1719. (Note: Oundle parish register gives his date of birth as 20 February 1719.) He was the second child and eldest son of William Whitwell, a lawyer who had studied at St John's College, Cambridge, and Ann Griffin, the grand-daughter of Edward Griffin, 1st Baron Griffin of Braybrooke, and Essex Howard, one of the daughters of James Howard, 3rd Earl of Suffolk and 3rd Baron Howard de Walden of Audley End. Of Griffin's eight siblings, two brothers and three sisters survived to adulthood. Three of them married, but none had children. His brother Mathew rose to the rank of rear-admiral in the Royal Navy, sister Ann was a maid of honour to Anne, Princess Royal and Princess of Orange and married Count Welderen, and sister Mary married royal chaplain William Parker. Griffin spent his early years at the family home of Berrystead in Oundle. He attended Winchester College between 1734 and 1736.

=== Career and peerages ===
Whitwell decided not to follow in the footsteps of his father and grandfather, who were both lawyers, but instead chose a career in the Army. He was commissioned as an ensign in the 3rd regiment of Foot Guards and lieutenant in the Army in 1739. He served with the Pragmatic Army in the Low Countries and Germany during the War of the Austrian Succession and was promoted to captain in his regiment and lieutenant colonel in the Army in March 1744.

Whitwell's Name Act 1748
- Act of Parliament
- Parliament of Great Britain
- Long title: An Act for enabling John Griffin Whitwell Esquire and his Issue to take and use the Surname and Arms of Griffin.
- Citation: 22 Geo. 2. c. 2 Pr.
- Territorial extent: Great Britain

Dates
- Royal assent: 16 February 1749
- Commencement: 29 November 1748 (Note: Start of session.)

Status: Current legislation

On 9 March 1749, Griffin married Anna Maria Schutz, the daughter of Colonel John Schutz. Prior to his marriage, Griffin's maternal aunt Elizabeth, Countess of Portsmouth, who was childless, agreed to settle her share of the Saffron Walden estates on him on condition he changed his name from Whitwell to Griffin. He did so by a private act of Parliament, Whitwell's Name Act 1748 (22 Geo. 2. c. 2 Pr.), becoming John Griffin Griffin when the act received royal assent in February 1749. In November 1749, Griffin was elected as Member of Parliament for Andover on the Whig interest of his aunt's second husband John Wallop, 1st Earl of Portsmouth. He was re-elected on six occasions, retaining his seat until 1784.

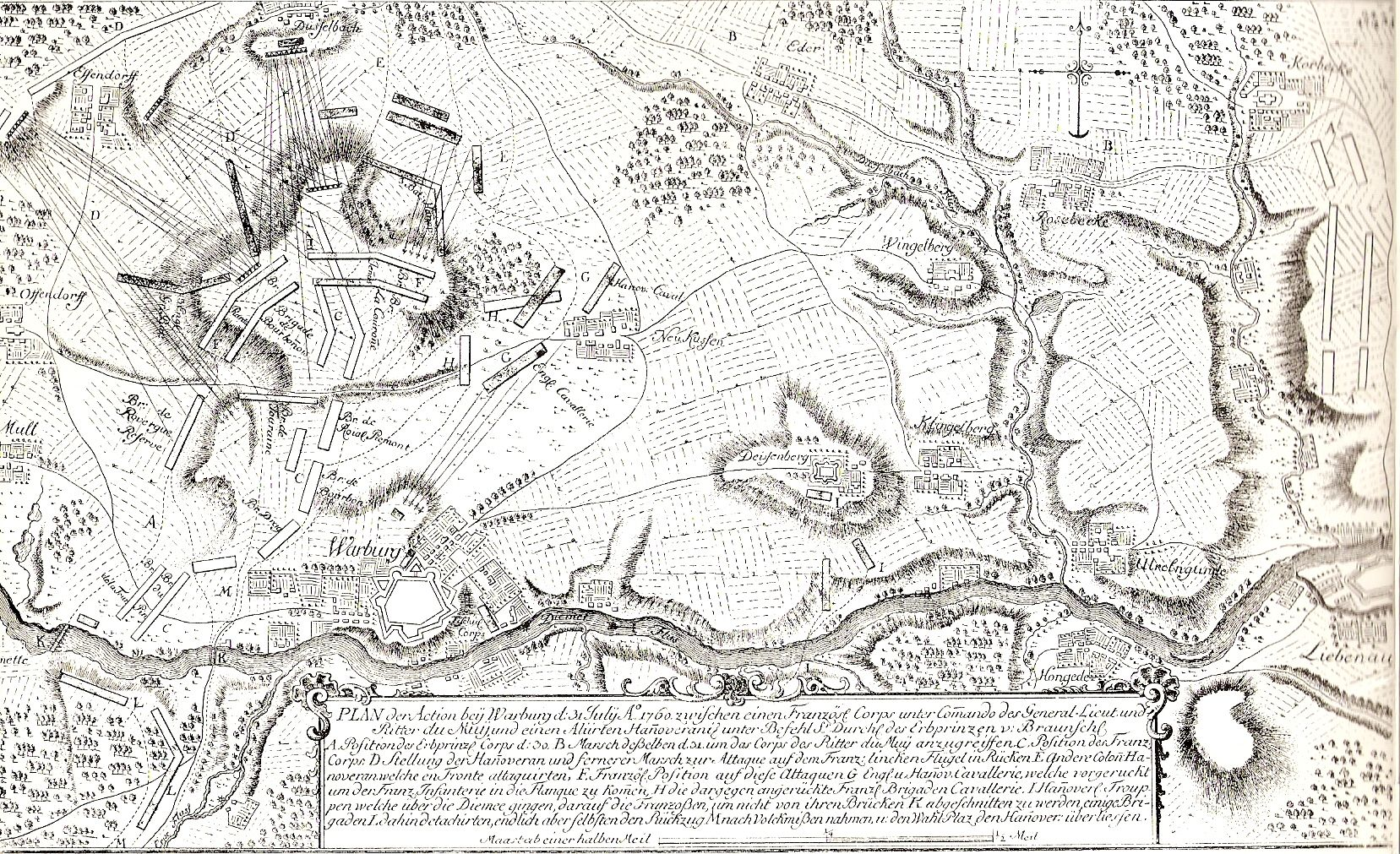
Plan of the Battle of Warburg where Griffin led his brigade to victory

At the beginning of the Seven Years' War, Griffin was appointed aide-de-camp to King George II. In 1758 he became major of the 50th Regiment of Foot and in 1759 became colonel of the regiment. In 1760 he was appointed colonel of the 33rd Regiment of Foot. In July 1760, he commanded a brigade at the Battle of Corbach. At Corbach, following the arrival of French reinforcements from Frankenberg, the allied army was forced to withdraw. He also commanded a brigade at the Battle of Warburg later that month where the allied army were more successful. He was wounded at the Battle of Kloster Kampen in October 1760 when shot in the leg. His injury forced him to return to England In 1761, having made several applications, Griffin was appointed Knight Companion of the Order of the Bath He was colonel of the 1st troop Horse Grenadier Guards from 1766 to 1788 and the 4th dragoons from 1788 until his death in 1797. He was promoted to general in 1778 and field-marshal in 1796 From 1760, when he was invalided out of active service, his military positions required very minimal duties and he carried out only about half a dozen tasks over a thirty-five year period. On one occasion he was asked to issue a reprimand to an officer; the other tasks were of a ceremonial nature. He was unsuccessful in his attempts to obtain a military governorship of a garrison town.

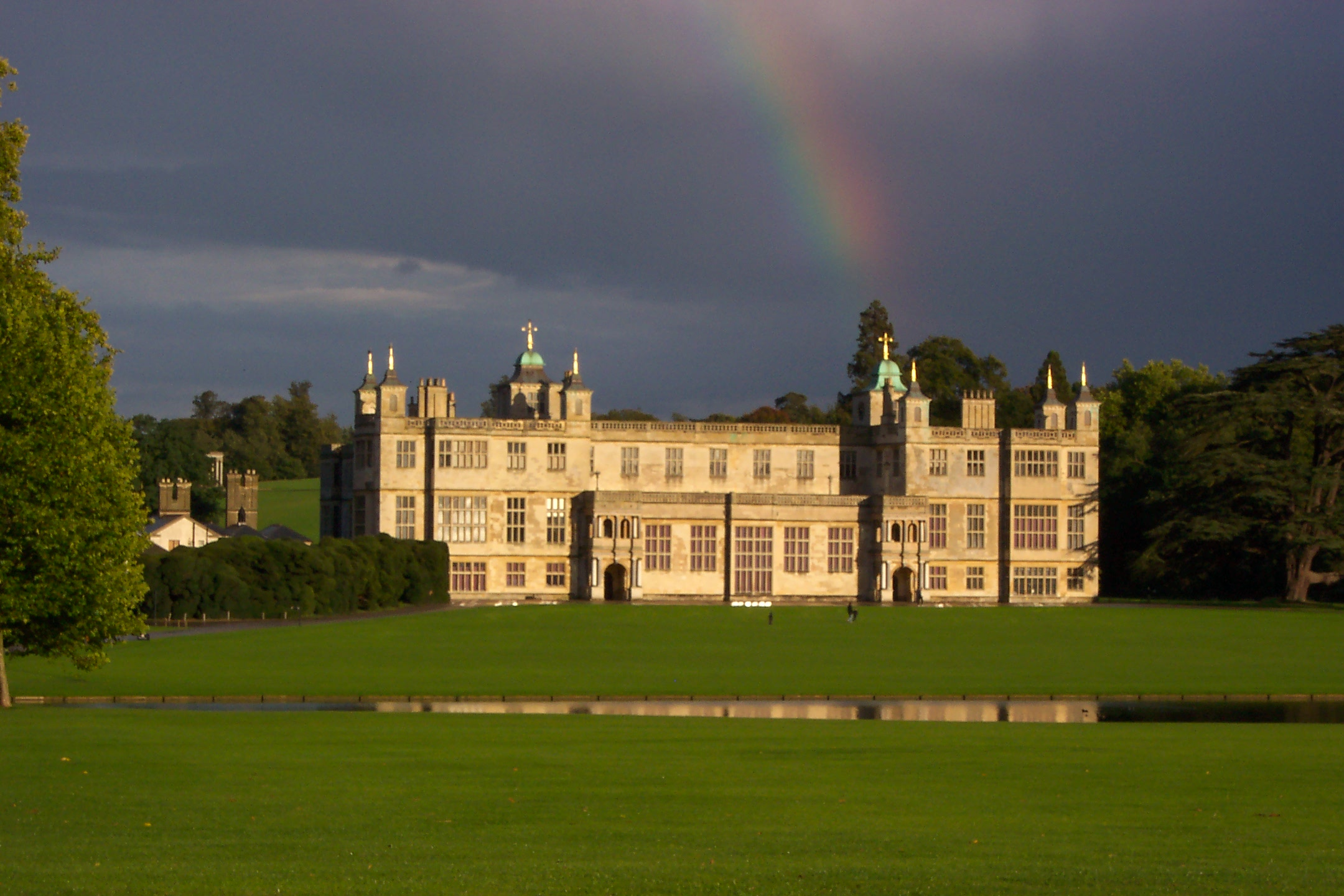
Audley End House

Griffin inherited Audley End House when his aunt died in 1762 and made it his home. He continued the restoration that had been started by his aunt, spending over £100,000 on the house and park. Capability Brown was employed to lay out the grounds, while Robert Adam worked on the interior of the house and designed a bridge over the River Cam to the south-west of the property and a temple to the west to commemorate the ending of the Seven Years War. An obelisk in memory of his aunt was erected to the north of the house. Biagio Rebecca was commissioned to paint a series of portraits of previous owners of the house. Griffin was widowed in August 1764, but within less than a year had married seventeen-year-old Catherine Clayton, daughter of William Clayton of Harleyford Manor, Buckinghamshire.

Having obtained a knighthood and a country seat, Griffin set about securing a peerage. In August 1766 he wrote to prime minister William Pitt, 1st Earl of Chatham Lord Chatham, explaining that his family peerage had died out with the death of his uncle, the 3rd Baron Griffin of Braybrooke, that he had a joint claim with the earl of Bristol to the Barony of Howard de Walden, and that he was possessed of a family estate that had always, since the Dissolution of the monasteries, been owned by a peer. He received a non-commital reply from Chatham, but continued to petition the king and eventually was successful in 1784, when the barony was called out of abeyance in his favour and he was elevated to the peerage as 4th Baron Howard de Walden. Having been a Whig in the House of Commons, he usually voted with the Tories in the House of Lords. He supported William Pitt the Younger during the American Revolutionary War and was rewarded with the position of Lord Lieutenant of Essex in 1784.

Neither of Griffin's two marriages produced any children, nor did he have any nephews or nieces. He made his second cousin once removed and lifelong friend, Richard Neville Aldworth Neville of Billingbear, his heir. Neville was also the nephew of the countess of Portsmouth's first husband, Henry Grey. In 1788, Griffin was given another peerage, Baron Braybrooke, with special remainder to Aldworth Neville.

== Death and legacy ==
Griffin died aged seventy-eight on 25 May 1797 at Audley End House and was buried in the family vault at St Mary's Church, Saffron Walden. The title of Lord Braybrooke and the Audley End estate were inherited by Richard Aldworth Neville, who assumed the name of Griffin, while the Lord Howard de Walden barony again fell into abeyance. Griffin's second wife Catherine died in 1807 and was buried beside him.

There are two portraits of Griffin at Audley End House. One, by Benjamin West shows him sitting in a military tent in his general's uniform. The other, by Biagio Rebecca shows him in his robes of the Order of the Bath. William Addison, in his history of Audley End House described Griffin as being, in both public and private life, "the outspoken soldier, valued for his integrity and simple goodness". His world, writes Addison, was "made up of soldiers and sportsmen, of politicians and country parsons, and equally of gamekeepers and land stewards".

== Notes ==
Parliament of the United Kingdom
Preceded by John Pollen; Viscount Lymington	Member of Parliament for Andover; 1749–1784; With: John Pollen 1749–1754; Sir Francis Blake Delaval 1754–1768; Benjamin Lethieullier 1768–1784	Succeeded by Benjamin Lethieullier; William Fellowes
Military offices
Preceded by Studholme Hodgson	Colonel of the 50th Regiment of Foot; 1759–1760	Succeeded by Edward Carr
Preceded by Lord Charles Hay	Colonel of the 33rd Regiment of Foot; 1760–1766	Succeeded by The Earl Cornwallis
Preceded by Viscount Cantelupe	Captain and Colonel of the 1st Troop Horse Grenadier Guards; 1766–1788	Troop abolished
Preceded by Benjamin Carpenter	Colonel of the 4th (Queen's Own) Regiment of Dragoons; 1788–1797	Succeeded by Sir Robert Sloper
Honorary titles
Preceded by The Earl Waldegrave	Lord Lieutenant of Essex; 1784–1797	Succeeded by The Lord Braybrooke
Vacant Title last held by The Earl of Rochford	Vice-Admiral of Essex; 1795–1797	Vacant Title next held by The Lord Braybrooke
Peerage of England
Vacant Title last held by James Howard	Baron Howard de Walden; 1794–1797	Vacant Title next held by Frederick Hervey
Peerage of Great Britain
New creation	Baron Braybrooke; 1788–1797	Succeeded by Richard Griffin
