= Edward Probst =

Edward Albert Probst
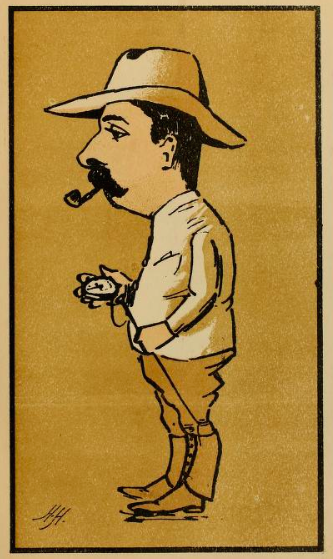

Chairman of the Shanghai Municipal Council
- In office January 1897 – May 1897
- Preceded by: James Scott
- Succeeded by: Albert Burkill

Personal details
- Born: 1858 Louth, Lincolnshire, England
- Died: April 9, 1931 (aged 73) England
- Profession: Businessman

Edward Albert Probst was the chairman of the Shanghai Municipal Council in from January 1897 to May 1897 when he resigned due to vote of no confidence in the council.

== Biography ==
Probst was born in approximately 1858, the son of Peter Everard Probst.

Burkill moved to Shanghai in about 1880. He joined the firm of Iverson & Co in which he became a partner in 1887. The firm merged to become Ward, Probst & Co and subsequently Probst, Hanbury & Co.

Probst was a keen sportsman and in his early days in Shanghai was a leading cricketer being named to the Shanghai interport team. He was also a keen rower and also a horse racing enthusiast.

Probst served for a number of years on the Shanghai Municipal Council and in January 1897 was elected chairman of the council. In May 1897 he resigned along with his fellow council members as a result of the "wheelbarrow riots" in Shanghai. Albert Burkill took his place as chairman of the council.

Probst died on 9 April 1931 in England.

== Marriage ==
Probst married Alice Deacon, daughter of Albert Deacon, on 1 October 1890 in Shanghai.
