= Calpurnia Hispulla =

First-century Roman woman

Calpurnia Hispulla was a first- and second-century Roman woman known from the letters of Pliny the Younger. She raised and educated her niece, Calpurnia, the third wife of Pliny.

== Biography ==
Calpurnia Hispulla was the daughter of the Roman knight Lucius Calpurnius Fabatus, who held several military and municipal posts and who escaped condemnation by the emperor Nero as an accomplice in the accusations against Junia Lepida in 64 AD. Her brother and sister-in-law predeceased her, leaving an orphaned daughter, Calpurnia, whom Calpurnia Hispulla raised.

Calpurnia Hispulla was a friend of Pliny’s mother Plinia Marcella and took an interest in Pliny since his childhood. When her niece Calpurnia was fourteen, she was involved in arranging a marriage between her and Pliny.

Calpurnia Hispulla seems to have been unmarried and to have lived with her father until his death in Como the 110s.

== Pliny's letters ==
Pliny’s letter to Calpurnia Hispulla (Book IV:19) reads:

As you yourself are a model of the family virtues, as you returned the affection of your brother, who was the best of men and devoted to you, and as you love his daughter as though she were your own child, and show her not only the affection of an aunt but even that of the father she has lost, I feel sure you will be delighted to know that she is proving herself worthy of her father, worthy of you, and worthy of her grandfather… Nor would other feelings become one who had been brought up at your knee, who had been trained by your precepts, who had seen in your house nothing that was not pure and honourable, and, in short, had been taught to love me at your recommendation. For as you loved and venerated my mother as a daughter, so even when I was a boy you used to shape my character, and encourage me, and prophesy that I should develop into the man that my wife now believes me to be. Consequently my wife and I try to see who can thank you best, I because you have given her to me, and she because you gave me to her, as though you chose us the one for the other.

In Book VIII:11, Pliny assures Calpurnia Hispulla that her niece has recovered from an illness caused by miscarriage, saying:

When I think of your love for your brother's daughter—a love which is even tenderer than a mother's indulgent affection… Consequently, though you will be disappointed in not being solaced for the loss of your dead brother by a nephew or a niece, you must bear in mind that that consolation is only postponed, not denied you, inasmuch as she on whom you can build your hopes has been spared to us…

Pliny also mentions visiting Calpurnia Hispulla and her father in Book IV:1 and V:14.

In book X:120, Pliny says that he granted his wife an imperial permit to travel back to Italy and console her aunt Calpurnia Hispulla after the death of her father.

== Analysis ==
Scholars have discussed Pliny’s presentation of Calpurnia Hispulla as an exemplary Roman woman. She is a loving supporter and wise educator of Calpurnia, and extends the borders of her gender role by appearing as Calpurnia's surrogate father and an influence on the young Pliny himself.

It has been suggested that she was related to Corellius Rufus, whose wife’s name was Hispulla, and therefore brought about the connection between Pliny and that family.
