= Calpurnia (wife of Pliny the Younger) =

Ancient Roman woman

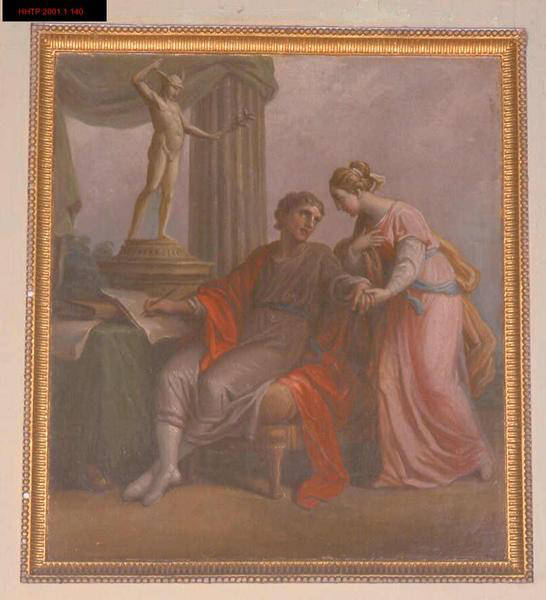
Pliny and Calpurnia depicted by Biagio Rebecca in about 1768

Calpurnia (c. 90 AD – c. 110 AD) was a second-century Roman woman who was the third wife of Pliny the Younger. She is the subject or addressee of several of Pliny’s letters, and has therefore been a useful figure for the study of ancient Roman women.

== Life ==
Calpurnia was the daughter of Calpurnius, the only son of the Roman knight Calpurnius Fabatus. When her parents died, she was raised by her father's sister, Calpurnia Hispulla, in Fabatus' household.

In about 104, when she was fourteen years old, Calpurnia’s aunt arranged a marriage between her and Pliny the Younger. The marriage appears to have been an affectionate one. Pliny’s letter IV:19 reports to her aunt that Calpurnia enjoyed memorising his orations and setting his lyric poetry to music, despite having received no musical instruction. His letters VI:4, VI:7, and VII:5 express that he loved and missed her, and that they kept in touch while she was staying in Campania for her health,

In about 107, Calpurnia experienced a miscarriage.

In the 110s, Calpurnia accompanied Pliny on his errand to Bithynia. She returned to Italy on the death of her grandfather to comfort her aunt. Pliny appears to have died during the voyage.

== Analysis ==
Many commentators have explored how Pliny constructs the character of Calpurnia across his letters. In IV:19, he presents her as an ideal wife. She transitions from childhood to the role of a wife and manager of a household, and reflects well on Pliny, as Roman men were often judged on the character of their wives. One of her main appeals is her interest in Pliny’s literary work. His love letters to her, VI:4 and VII:5, allow Pliny to experiment with the elegiac trope of a locked-out lover borrowed from Ovid. His letters to her grandfather and aunt about her miscarriage focus on her potential to provide him with children.
