= Albert Burkill =

Chairman of the Shanghai Municipal Council from 1897 to 1898

Albert Robson Burkill

Chairman of the Shanghai Municipal Council
- In office May 1897 – January 1898
- Preceded by: Edward Probst
- Succeeded by: James Fearon

Personal details
- Born: 1839 Louth, Lincolnshire, England
- Died: November 29, 1913 (aged 73) Waltham St. Lawrence, Berkshire
- Profession: Businessman

Albert Robson Burkill was the chairman of the Shanghai Municipal Council in from 1897 to 1898.

== Biography ==
Burkill was born in Louth, Lincolnshire, in 1839, the son of John Burkill.

Burkill moved to Shanghai in the early 1866. He joined the staff of Glover, Dow & Co and some years later went into business on his own account. In 1877, he formed Cromie and Burkill with Mr Cromie and continued in partnership until 1895. In that year he formed A.R. Burkill & Sons with his sons C.R. and A.W. Burkill. He retired from business in 1898 and returned to England. A.R. Burkill & Sons (HK) Co Ltd continues to operate in Hong Kong.

Burkill was also one of the founders of the Shanghai Land Investment Company. He.was a member of the Committee of the China Association and was a steward of the Shanghai Race Club.

Burkill was elected to and became chairman of the Shanghai Municipal Council in May 1897 following the en masse resignation of the previous council as a result of the "wheelbarrow riots" in Shanghai. He served until January 1898 when a new council was elected and James Fearon took his place.

Burkill Road (now Fengyang Road) in Shanghai was named after Burkill.

Burkill died on 29 November 1913 at his residence in Waltham St Lawrence, Berkshire.

== Marriage ==
Burkill married Clementia Caroline Lockett Dow, daughter of James Dow, on 27 April 1872 in Shanghai. They had two sons, Albert William and Charles Reginald Burkill.
