= Henry Neville (Gentleman of the Privy Chamber) =

Sir Henry Neville
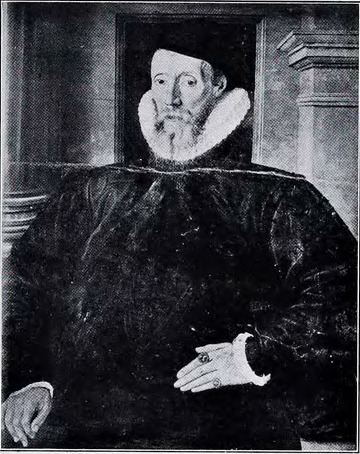
- Born: Henry Neville c. 1520
- Died: 13 January 1593 (aged 72–73)
- Spouses: Winifred Losse; Elizabeth Gresham; Elizabeth Bacon
- Children: Sir Henry Neville; Edward Neville; Francis Neville; William Neville; Katherine Neville
- Parent(s): Sir Edward Neville, Eleanor Windsor

Sir Henry Neville (c. 1520 – 13 January 1593) of Billingbear House, Berkshire, was a Gentleman of the Privy Chamber to King Henry VIII.

== Family background ==
Sir Henry Neville's father was Sir Edward Neville (died 1538), of Addington Park in Kent, who married Eleanor, daughter of Andrew Windsor, 1st Baron Windsor, and Elizabeth, sister of Edward Blount, 2nd Baron Mountjoy.

His father was the younger brother of George Neville, 5th Baron Bergavenny and older brother to Sir Thomas Nevill, Speaker of the House of Commons. As Manning said, the Neville surname "stands proudly forth as a pedigree in itself, and is associated with all that is noble in blood, distinguished in chivalry, eminent in counsel, and celebrated in the historic annals of Britain."

== Career ==
Sir Henry Neville secured a post in the Privy Chamber despite the fact that his father was allegedly involved in the Courtenay conspiracy, and moreover, executed in 1538 by order of King Henry VIII, charged with "devising to maintain, promote, and advance one Reginald Pole, late Dean of Exeter, enemy of the King, beyond the sea, and to deprive the King". (Reginald Pole was a Catholic exile and a second cousin once removed of Neville).

In March 1542, Neville attended Charles de Marillac the French ambassador; however, he apparently was not destined to have a career in diplomatic service, for, by 1546, he is found serving as a groom of the privy chamber. He was made Groom of the Privy Chamber in 1546, Gentleman of the privy chamber in 1550, was knighted on 11 October 1551 and appointed High Sheriff of Berkshire for 1572.

He was elected to Parliament as Knight of the shire for Berkshire five times, from 1553 to 1584. Neville was Henry VIII's godson and apparently was in good favour with the king, to the extent that he was included as one of the grooms who witnessed his will, of which he was afforded a legacy.

In 1551, he testified at the trial of Stephen Gardiner, and revealed the strong detestation Henry VIII had for the bishop. Neville was closely aligned with John Dudley and Sir Henry Sidney, the former of whom promoted him to Gentleman of the Privy chamber during the reign of Edward VI.

As with many Protestants, Neville left the country upon Mary I's accession, however, he returned under Elizabeth I, and continued his career holding various posts in Berkshire, where he lived at Billingbear House, until his death on 13 January 1593.

Sir Henry Neville was buried in the parish church at Waltham St Lawrence in Berkshire, where there is a monument depicting Sir Henry, his second wife, Elizabeth Gresham, her mother, Frances Gresham, and Sir Henry and his second wife's daughter, Elizabeth Gresham.

== Marriages and issue ==
Henry Neville married firstly, between 1551 and 1555, Winifred Losse (d. in or before 1561), daughter of a property speculator, Hugh Losse (d.1555) of Whitchurch, London, by whom he had no issue.

Neville married secondly, by 1561, Elizabeth Gresham (d. 6 or 7 November 1573), granddaughter of Sir Richard Gresham, Lord Mayor of London, and only daughter and heir of the latter's elder son, John Gresham (d.1560), by Frances Thwaytes, the daughter and coheir of Sir Henry Thwaytes of Lund, Yorkshire. (Note: Riordan and Harley state that John Gresham was of Titsey, Surrey.) In the will of their grandmother, Frances (née Thwaytes) Gresham, dated 20 October 1580 and proved 9 November 1580.

Neville's children by his second marriage are named: Henry, Edward, Francis, William, and Katherine. Katherine married Edmund Doyley of Shottisham, Norfolk. (Note: Other sources state that Neville had four sons and two daughters by his second marriage; Riordan 2004; Harley 2005, p. 5.)

Neville married thirdly, about May 1578, Elizabeth Bacon (c.1541 – 3 May 1621), widow of Sir Robert Doyley (d. between 21 and 29 July 1577) of Chislehampton, Oxfordshire, and Greenlands in Hambleden, Buckinghamshire. Elizabeth Bacon was the eldest daughter of Queen Elizabeth's Lord Keeper of the Great Seal, Sir Nicholas Bacon (1510–1579), by his first wife, Jane Ferneley (d.1552), the daughter of William Ferneley of Suffolk. (Note: According to Riordan, Neville's third wife was the widow of Sir Richard Doyley, and daughter of Sir Nicholas Bacon, 1st Baronet, of Redgrave (c. 1543 – 1624), by his wife, Anne.)

After Neville's death, his widow, Elizabeth, married, before the end of September 1595, Sir William Peryam (d. 9 October 1604). She made her last will on 12 November 1618, and died on 3 May 1621. There is a monument to her in the church of St Mary's, Henley-on-Thames.

== See also ==
- House of Neville

== Notes ==
Political offices
Preceded by Robert Keilway	Custos Rotulorum of Berkshire bef. 1584 – 1593	Succeeded by Sir Edward Norreys
