= Calpurnius Fabatus =

1st century AD Roman nobleman

Calpurnius Fabatus was an Ancient Roman nobleman (eques) of the 1st century AD from the gens Calpurnia.

He was grandfather to Calpurnia, wife of the Pliny the Younger, who addressed several letters to Fabatus. He possessed a country house, Villa Camilliana, in Campania. He long survived his son, Pliny's father-in-law, in memory of whom he erected a portico at Comum, in Cisalpine Gaul. His daughter was Calpurnia Hispulla.

In AD 64, he was accused by suborned informers of being privy to the crimes of adultery and magic which were alleged against Junia Lepida, the wife of Gaius Cassius Longinus. By an appeal to Nero, judgment against Fabatus was deferred, and he eventually eluded the accusation.

According to an inscription, Fabatus died at Comum.
