= Richard Neville (soldier) =

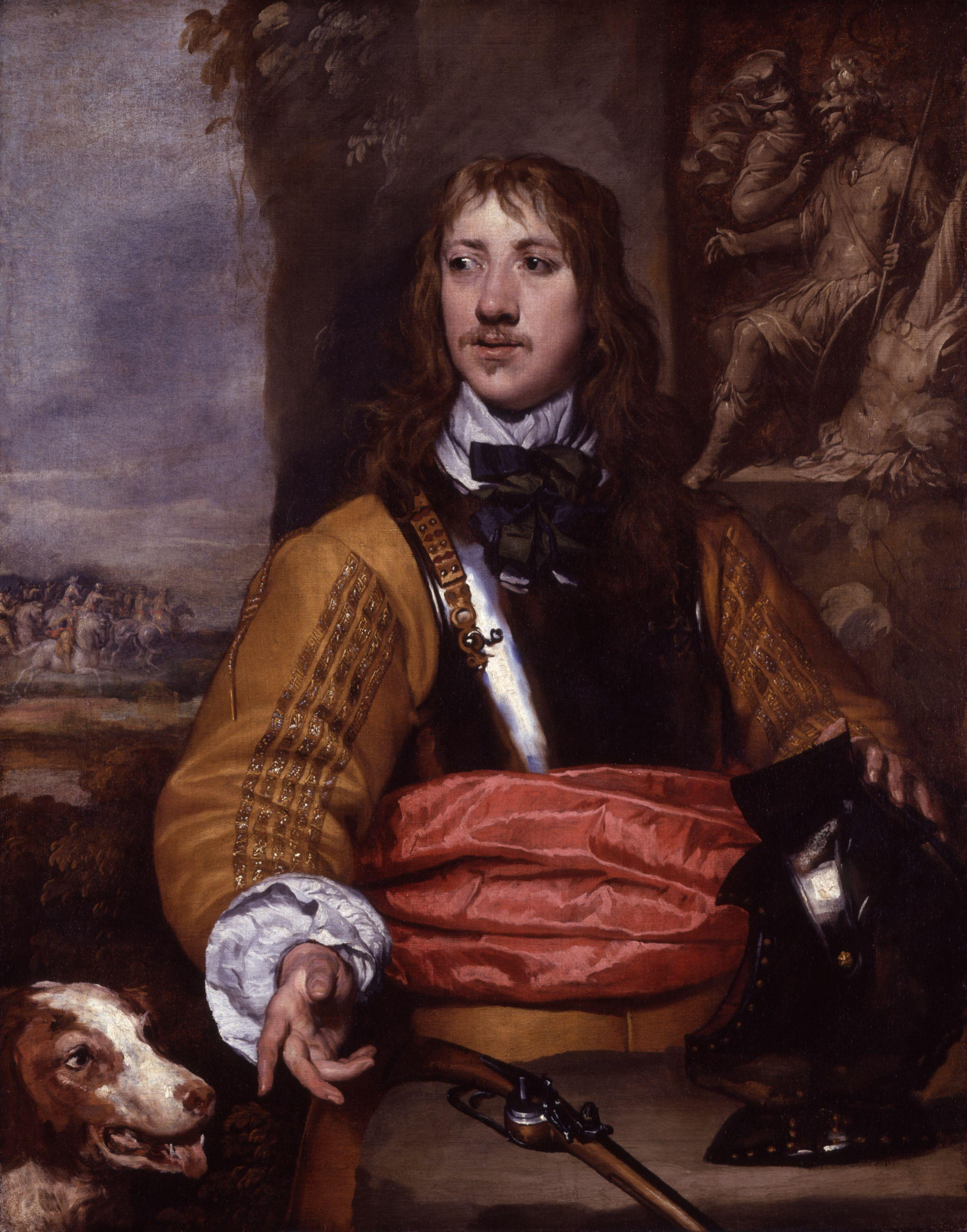
Richard Neville by William Dobson

Richard Neville DL (30 May 1615 – 7 October 1676) served in the English Civil War as a Royalist. He came to prominence as commander at the First Battle of Newbury in 1643 when he commanded the Royalist troops.

== Biography ==
Neville was born at Billingbear House in Waltham St Lawrence, the son and heir of Sir Henry Neville (died 1629) and educated at Queens' College, Cambridge (1631). He was the elder brother of the writer Henry Neville. His mother, Elizabeth (née Smyth), was given immediate rights to the manor in her lifetime, remarried Sir John Thorowgood and lived until 1669. Neville's grandfather was Henry Neville, the Elizabethan politician, diplomat and courtier.

Neville joined the Royalists and served under the Earl of Carnarvon at the Battle of Newbury in 1643. Carnarvon was killed and Neville took up the command as a Colonel of Horse. He was appointed High Sheriff of Berkshire for 1643–44 and in April 1644 he was commissioned to raise an auxiliary regiment of the Berkshire Trained Bands to garrison Reading. The following month the Royalists demolished the fortifications of the town and withdrew to their main base at Oxford, where Neville's regiment continued to serve. He was with King Charles I at Oxford in 1646.

After the Restoration of the Monarchy he became a Justice of the Peace and Deputy Lieutenant for Berkshire from 1660 to his death. In 1667 Waltham St Lawrence Parish Registers recorded that:

September 17th, 1667, King Charles 2nd, with his brother James Duke of Yorke, Prince Rupert Duke of Cumberland, James Duke of Monmouth and many more of the nobles dined at Bellingbeare in the great Parlour.

In 1670 he was elected to Parliament as Knight of the Shire (MP) for Berkshire.

He married Anne, the daughter of Sir John Heydon, Lieutenant-General of the Ordnance, of Baconthorpe, Norfolk and had two sons and five daughters. When Neville died he was buried at Waltham St Lawrence. He left his estates to his elder son, John, who died childless and so they afterwards passed to Richard, the younger son.
