= Waltham St Lawrence =

Village and civil parish in Berkshire, England

Coordinates: 51°29′00″N 0°48′18″W

- Village and civil parish
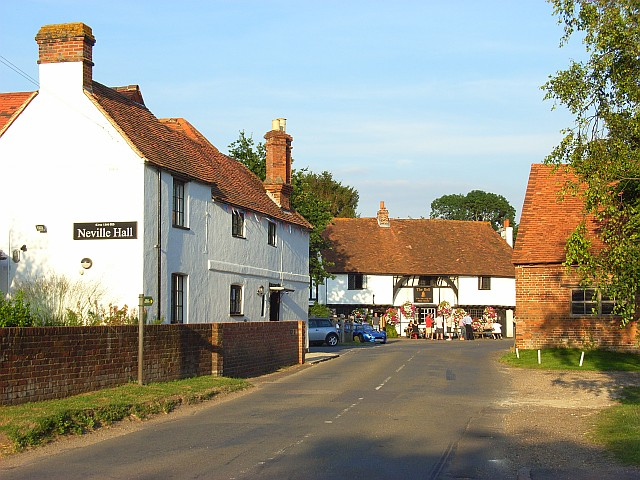
- Neville Hall and the Bell Inn

- Location within Berkshire
- Population: 1,232 (2001); 1,215 (2011 Census)
- OS grid reference: SU8276
- Civil parish: Waltham St Lawrence
- Unitary authority: Windsor and Maidenhead
- Ceremonial county: Berkshire
- Region: South East
- Country: England
- Sovereign state: United Kingdom
- Post town: Reading
- Postcode district: RG10
- Dialling code: 0118
- Police: Thames Valley
- Fire: Royal Berkshire
- Ambulance: South Central
- UK Parliament: Maidenhead

Waltham St Lawrence is a village and civil parish in the English county of Berkshire.

== Toponymy ==
The name 'Waltham' is believed to be derived from the Anglo-Saxon words Wealt and Ham, meaning 'homestead or village in a forest’ (probably indicating a royal hunting estate). The church is called St. Lawrence and thus gives the village its distinguishing affix.

== History ==
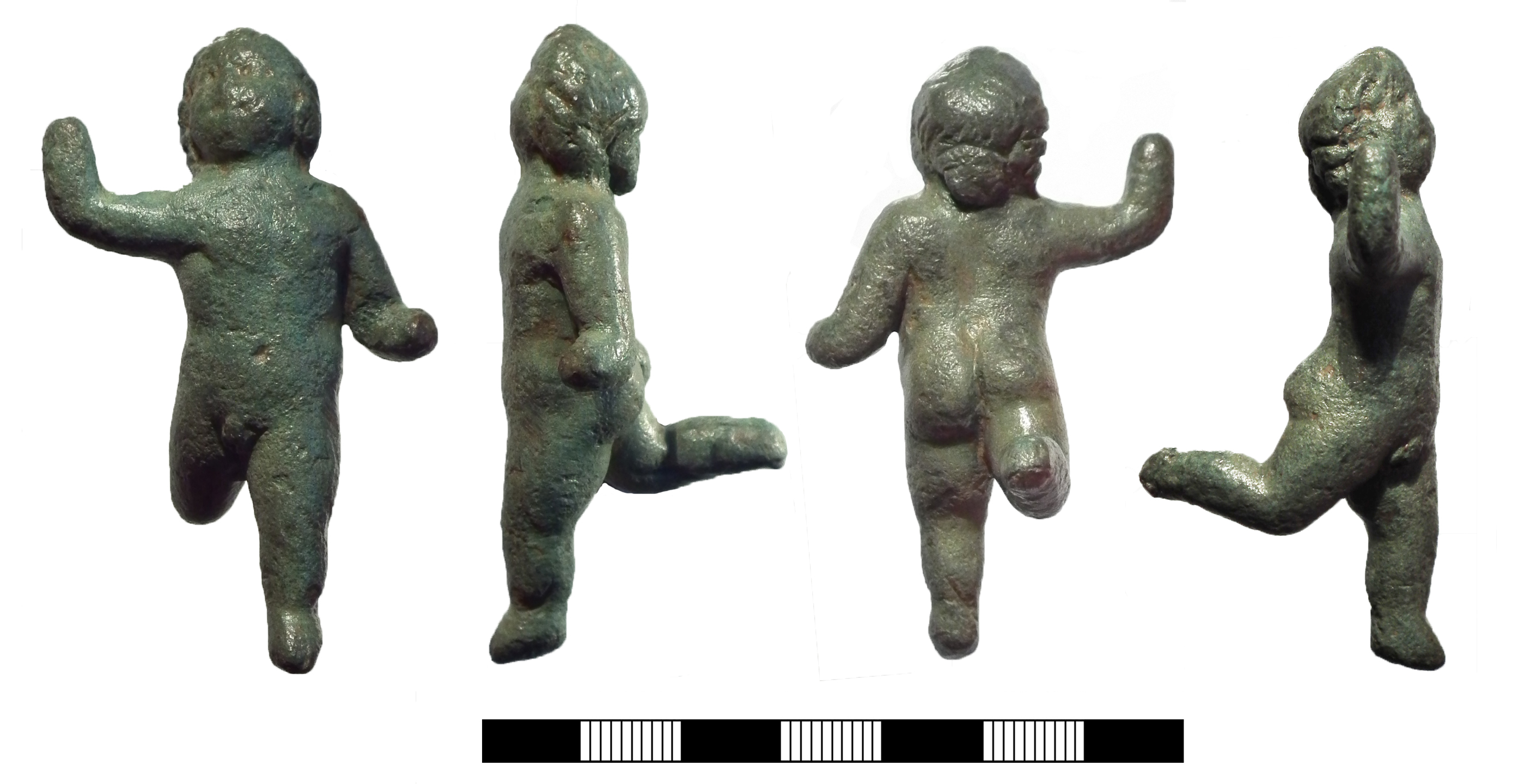
A Roman copper-alloy figurine of a child, found in Waltham St. Lawrence and dated to c. 43 – c. 410

There is evidence of the existence of a Roman temple in Weycock Field in the parish. Most of the coins found from the site are of the lower empire (except for a silver one of Amyntas, the grandfather of Alexander the Great) and the area was occupied until 270. The high-road to London formerly left the London to Reading main-road at the 29th milestone and ran across Weycock Field (often referred to as Weycock Highrood). The Priory of Hurley maintained a grange in the village on the site of what is now Church Farm (to the north-west of the present Church) and this is why the great tithes of the parish were formerly appropriated to the Prior of Hurley.

Until quite recent times a large lake separated Waltham St. Lawrence from Ruscombe (the name 'Stanlake' would seem to be a survival of this) and so the southern end of the parish was known as South Lake. The parish church was built where the ancient high-road entered the village. The manor is mentioned as early as 940 but its continuous appearance in historical records may be said to begin with its sale by Ethelred the Unready in 1006. His widow, Queen Emma, bestowed it upon Ælfwine, the Bishop of Winchester. The Domesday Book records: "The King holds Waltham in demesne" and it remained a royal manor until 1189 when Godfrey de Luci, Bishop of Winchester, purchased it from the Crown. It was retained by the bishops of Winchester until the Reformation.

Bishop Ponet of Winchester surrendered the manor of Waltham to King Edward VI in 1551, and the King donated it to Sir Henry Neville, one of the gentlemen of his Privy Chamber, but Queen Mary I returned it to Bishop John White of Winchester. King Edward's grant was confirmed (and Queen Mary's annulled) by an Act of Parliament in the first year of Queen Elizabeth I. Billingbear House was built by Sir Henry Neville in 1567, and this Elizabethan mansion existed as the home of the Nevilles until it was pulled down after a fire in the early 20th century. His son was the early-17th-century diplomat, Sir Henry Neville, junior. The parish register records that:

"September 17th, 1667, King Charles II, with his brother James Duke of Yorke, Prince Rupert Duke of Cumberland, James Duke of Monmouth and many more of the nobles dined at Bellingbear House in the great Parlour".

At that time, Richard Neville was Lord of the manor. Henry Neville, the last heir of this branch of the family, who had assumed the name of Grey, as heir of his maternal grandfather, Baron Grey of Werke, died in 1740. On the death of his widow, who afterwards had married as her second husband the Earl of Portsmouth, the manor of Waltham St. Lawrence was inherited by Richard Aldworth of Stanlake, whose father had married the daughter and heir of Colonel Richard Neville. Mr. Aldworth, on his accession to this property, took the name of Neville. The village school—now a County Primary School—was originally a National School with an endowment of £35 by Lord Braybrooke, a Neville descendant. The first Dame School held in the parish was held at 'Honeys'. The village war memorial is at Paradise Corner, which takes its name from the nearby Georgian manor house, Paradise House, on The Street.

In 1920 Hal Taylor founded The Golden Cockerel Press, privately printing books from a surplus army hut he had erected in the village. The press continued to operate there under the later ownership of Robert Gibbings until, in 1933, economic circumstances forced its sale and production was relocated to London.

== Location and amenities ==
Waltham St Lawrence is located in a rural setting in East Berkshire, south of the A4 trunk road and north of the M4 motorway, between Maidenhead and Reading. The parish is bordered by those of Twyford and Hurst to the west and White Waltham and Maidenhead to the east. The population is around 1000 adults with an all-ages estimate of 1,500 living in approximately 550 households. Residents are mainly employed in local towns such as Reading or Bracknell, although a significant number also commute to London. Waltham St Lawrence used to have its own village shop (with a part-time post office), There is a public house, the Bell, while Shurlock Row, in the parish, has another, the Shurlock Inn. West End, between the two villages, is a residential area, where the local village school is located.

== Transport ==
The nearest rail stations are at Twyford 4 mi (6.4 km), Maidenhead 5 mi (8.0 km), Wokingham 6 mi (9.7 km) and Bracknell 7 mi (11 km). There is a local bus service to Maidenhead and Bracknell.

== Parish church ==
=== Architecture ===
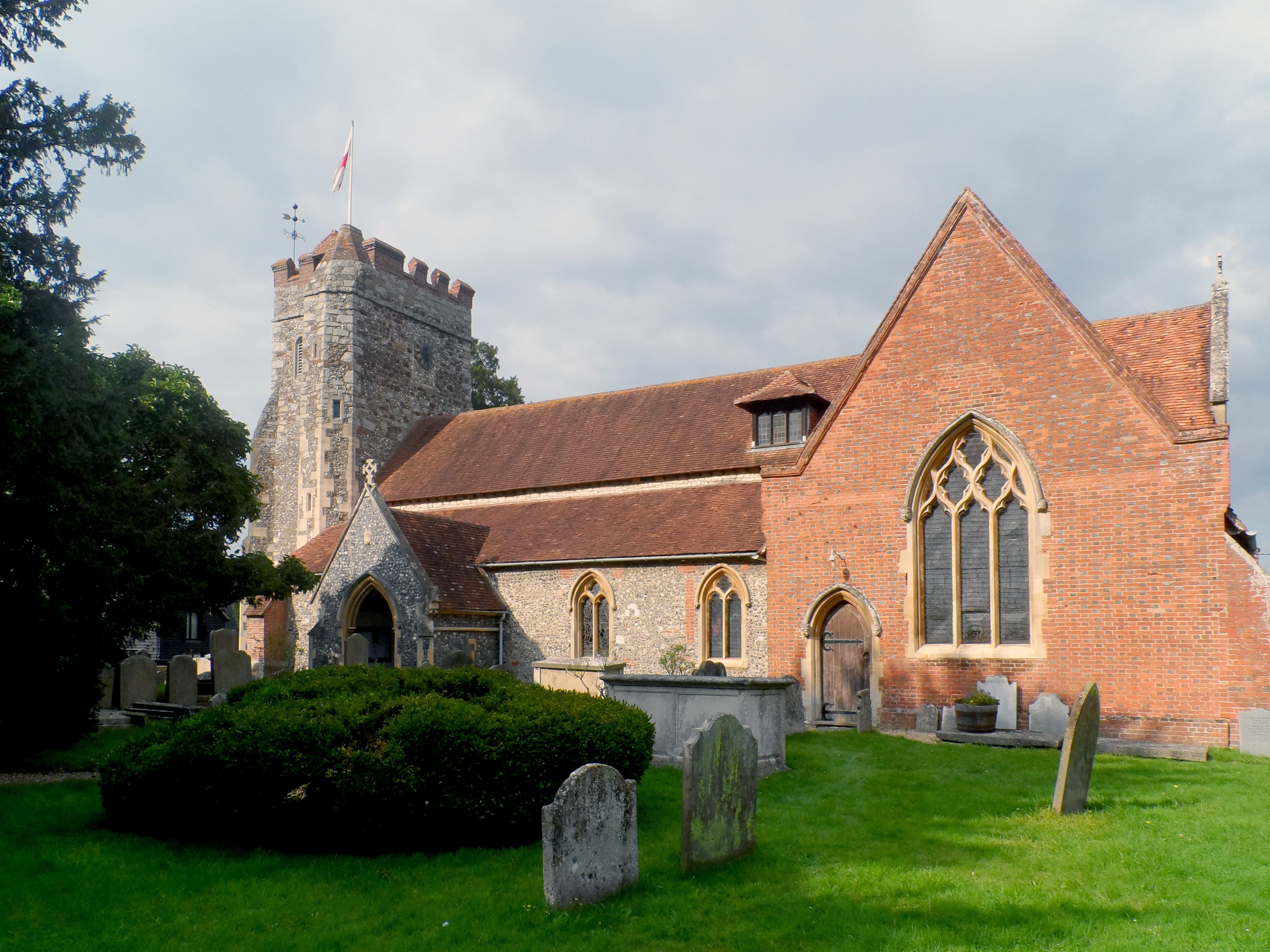
St Lawrence, Waltham St Lawrence

The parish church of St. Lawrence, a grade II* listed building, is of considerable antiquity. The original building probably ante-dates Bishop Godfrey's acquisition of the manor, for traces of pre-13th-century work can still be traced in the crude Norman arches at the west end of the nave. The church was rebuilt in the 13th century when a new aisle in the Decorated style was thrown out on the north side, and the Norman work was broken down, thus opening the new aisle to the nave. Later the chancel, with its side aisles was begun from the east end and the north and south walls of the nave were extended to join up with the new work in the 13th century. At the end of the 14th century, the south aisle of the chancel was enlarged and a square-headed window with trifoliated lights was inserted. Between this side-chapel and the south aisle of the nave is an Early English pointed arch. The window in the north chapel has a 14th-century window and on the south wall may be seen the remains of the ancient piscina. The porch on the south side of the church hides the old south door which is Norman work, set in a section of 11th-century walling.

The Early English Church was plastered inside and on this were commonly painted frescoes. A remnant of this treatment is to be found on the easternmost pillar of the north aisle. Close to this pillar and (behind the priest's stall) on the north side are to be seen traces of a pointed arch which evidently formed the doorway to the rood stairs. This is now blocked up. The Church has a small chancel with choir stalls and a pipe organ built by Henry Willis. The church building was restored in 1847 during the incumbency of the Revd. E. J. Parker, B.D., who gave the stained glass for the east window, which shows in its central panel the Crucifixion, with the Resurrection and Ascension of Our Lord on either side. The praying angels on either side of this window are adapted from the famous fresco in the Riccardi Palace in Florence. The reredos is 19th-century work and shows – in three compartments—the Descent from the Cross (centre); on the right, the Descent of the Holy Spirit at Pentecost; and on the left, Saint Paul preaching in Athens.

=== Bells ===
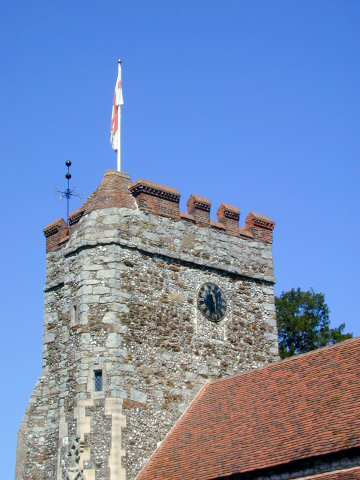
The tower of St Lawrence church

At the west end of the church is a square embattled tower, with a small turret at the south-west angle containing a staircase leading to the belfry and the top of the tower. The ringing chamber is open to the church and contains a beautiful window which is the only good glass in the building. This window, and the square-headed doorway below it, is of the Perpendicular period in English architecture. The tower was built in two sections. The lower part dates from the 14th century and the upper from the 16th. Some of the bells date back to the time of Charles II, but the peal only from 1808, when the bells were recast and rehung.

The peal was again rehung in 1931, and by the generous aid of G. A. Monkhouse, Esq., bells four and six were recast by Gillett and Johnston of Croydon. Extracts from the registers make it plain that the tenor and treble, together with the second bell, were broken in 1659, and these – together with the sacring bell – were recast into five bells, and a peal rung for them for the first time on Tuesday, 23 April: "the day which King Charles the 2nd was crowned at Westminster". The sacring bell – which hangs in its own turret at the top of the tower – bears the following inscription: "The gift of John A. Beere of the Hill Henbolt. Pray for the welfare of Robert Conisbe 1681". The A'Bear family lived at Hill Farm at Hare Hatch in the adjoining parish of Wargrave.

=== Registers ===
The parish registers its date from 25 November 1558. The originals are lodged for safekeeping with the county archivist in Reading, but the parish priest possesses a transcript (1558 to 1812) by Edmund Newbery. Apart from the usual entries of births, marriages and deaths, there are interesting memoranda, such as the following:

"Memorandum that the yewe tree at the churchyard gate on the right hand as one goeth into the churchyard up to the churchpond was planted by Thos. Wilkinson vicar of Waltham in February 1655"

"Mabel modwyn widowe abact 68 years old arraigned for witch craft at Redding 29th Feb: and condemned on the 5th of March, 1655. Shee lived at ye south-wist cornr. of lower Innings in ye cornr. next to Binfield".

== Notable people ==
- Albert Burkill, Chairman of the Shanghai Municipal Council
- Robert Gibbings, wood engraver, author, broadcaster, educator and publisher. Proprietor of the Golden Cockerel Press.
- Henry Neville (died 1615), English courtier, politician, diplomat, candidate for the authorship of Shakespeare's works.
- John Newbery, publisher
- Ernest Renshaw, former tennis player, died in the village.

== Film and television ==
In the 1990s BBC television series Pie in the Sky the titular restaurant, home of DI Henry Crabbe, is located in the fictional town of 'Middleton'. According to a map shown in the 2nd series, this is supposedly located at Waltham St Lawrence (although the filming location was the old town, Hemel Hempstead). Waltham St Lawrence village and its church have also been used for recording episodes of "Rosemary and Thyme" and "Midsomer Murders".
