= John Phillips (c. 1709–1775) =

John Phillips (c. 1709 – 28 December 1775) was an English master carpenter, builder, and architect who was active in London.

He inherited the considerable practice of his uncle, Thomas Phillips (c. 1689–1736), who was active as a speculative builder on the Harley estate, held the contract for carpentry and joiner's work at James Gibbs' St Martin-in-the-Fields and St Peter's, Vere Street, and built the wooden bridge across the Thames between Fulham and Putney (1729–30).

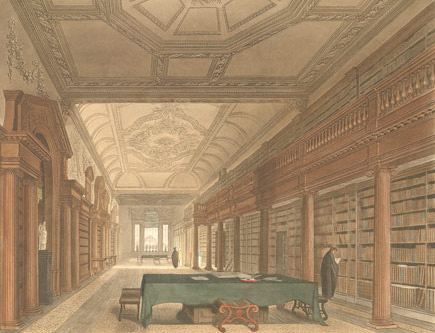
Phillips and Shakespear's Christ Church Library interior, from Rudolph Ackermann's History of Oxford (1813)

In partnership with George Shakespear, John Phillips developed Charles Street, Mayfair (1750) and other blocks of land in London's West End. Phillips was the "undertaker" for the whole north-west corner of the Grosvenor estate. Phillips built a grand house for Lord Bateman (1759–60) at the north end of Park Lane, and next to it Camelford House (1773–74) for Thomas Pitt, 1st Baron Camelford. A subcontractor for carving documented in 1773 was John Linnell, a prominent cabinetmaker.

In Oxford, Phillips constructed James Gibbs's wooden dome for the Radcliffe Camera and provided refined joinery in the building (1742–1750). Phillips and Shakespear were also responsible for the interior joinery of Christ Church Library (1752–1762, illustration, right).

For James West, Phillips and Shakespear extended Alscot Park, Warwickshire, (1750–1752), with a north wing and a rebuilt south wing (1762–1766) in a Gothick manner that Howard Colvin finds akin to designs by Batty Langley. For Elizabeth, Countess of Portsmouth, Phillips and Shakespear demolished the east wings and parts of the north and south wings of Audley End.

In 1771–72, Phillips constructed the wooden bridge at Battersea, under the direction of the architect Henry Holland. It was demolished in 1881.

During his career he held the post of Carpenter to His Majesty's Board of Works.

From his uncle, Phillips inherited the house in Brook Street that he occupied throughout his career; it survives as 39, Lower Brook Street, remodelled by a later occupant, Sir Jeffry Wyatville. In his retirement, he occupied and built Culham House, Culham, Oxfordshire, where his brother's descendants (John Phillips having died childless) joined the landed gentry, continuing to live there until 1935.

A sarcophagus in Phillips's memory is in the parish church of East Hagbourne.
