= Shurlock Row =

Village in Berkshire, England

Coordinates: 51°27′51″N 0°48′12″W

- Village
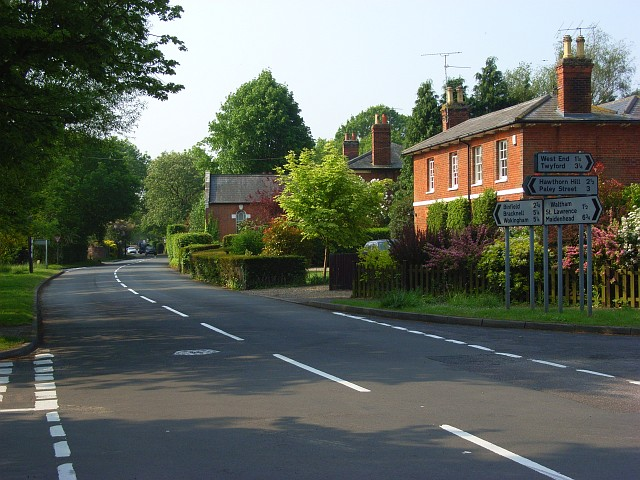
- Crossroads

- Location within Berkshire
- OS grid reference: SU833744
- Civil parish: Waltham St Lawrence
- Unitary authority: Windsor and Maidenhead
- Ceremonial county: Berkshire
- Region: South East
- Country: England
- Sovereign state: United Kingdom
- Post town: READING
- Postcode district: RG10
- Dialling code: 0118
- Police: Thames Valley
- Fire: Royal Berkshire
- Ambulance: South Central
- UK Parliament: Maidenhead

Shurlock Row is a village in the Royal Borough of Windsor and Maidenhead in Berkshire, England.

It is located in the heart of the Thames Valley, around 5.5 miles (9 km) south-west of Maidenhead and around 3 miles (5 km) east of Twyford, and within the civil parish of Waltham St Lawrence (where the 2011 Census population was included).

== History ==
In medieval times the village lay to the south of a large lake that separated the parish from Ruscombe, and this survives in local names such as South Lake House and nearby Stanlake Park. Following the Norman Conquest in the 11th Century, the area was named 'sud-lac rue', which later became known as Shurlock Row.

== The village today ==
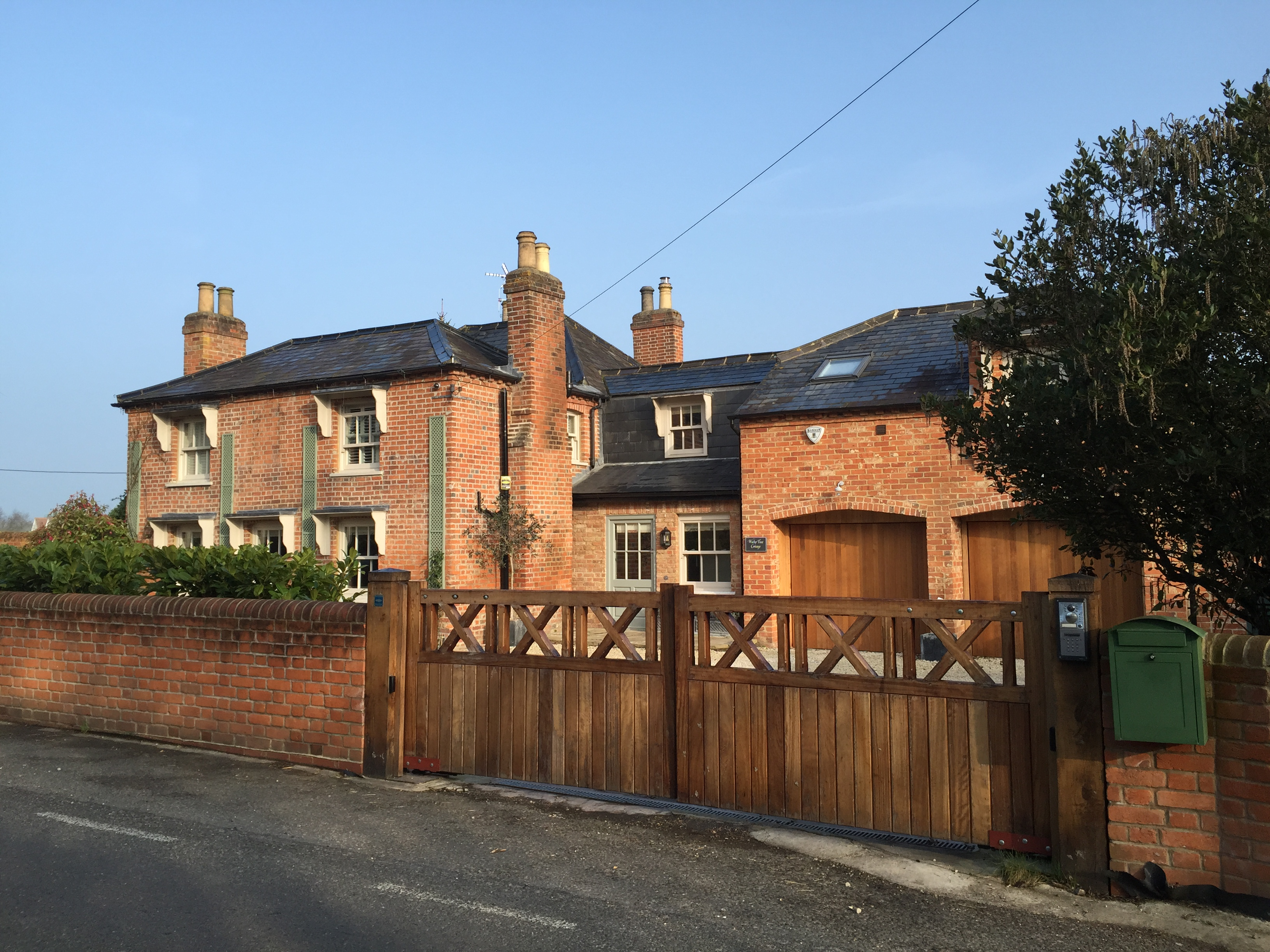
The Fox & Hounds, now Withy Tree Cottage

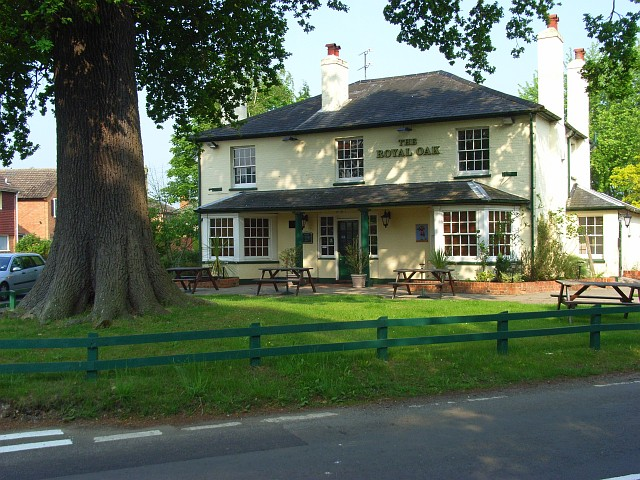
The Royal Oak

Shurlock Row is a linear village. Originally, there were four public houses in the village: The Royal Oak, The Fox and Hounds, The White Horse and The White Hart. The Royal Oak at the central crossroads closed down in 2009 and is now a private dwelling named Morland House. The Fox and Hounds was located at the south-west of the village on The Straight Mile and is now a renovated house called The Withy Tree. When The White Hart came under threat, a group of 17 villagers bought the pub and turned it into a gastropub, called The Shurlock Inn. The pub was sold in late 2016 to Rare Breed Angus Ltd, and has had significant renovations.

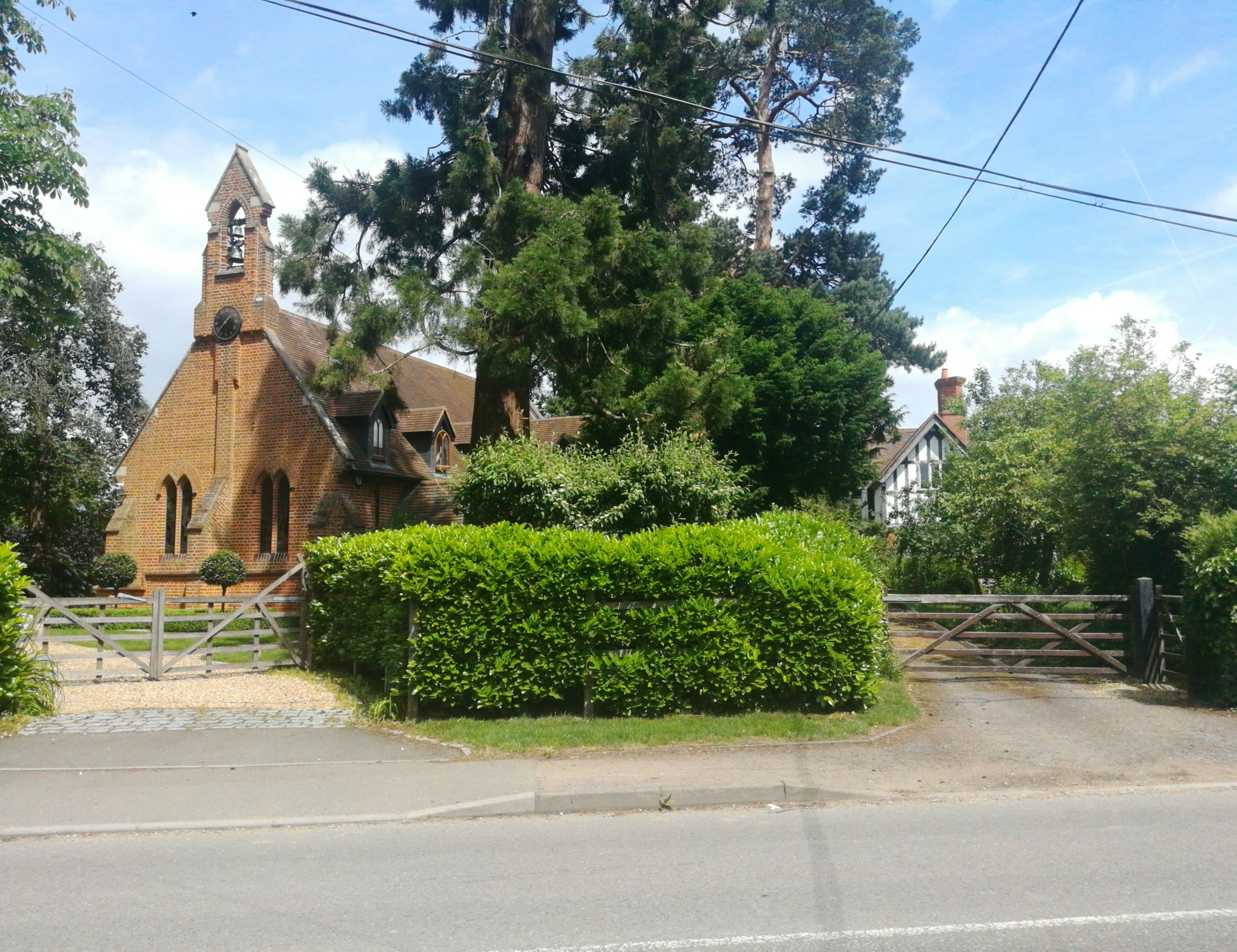
Former church

Shurlock Row itself has lost its general store, butcher shop and post office in the last 20 years. The village church has also been converted into a residential property.

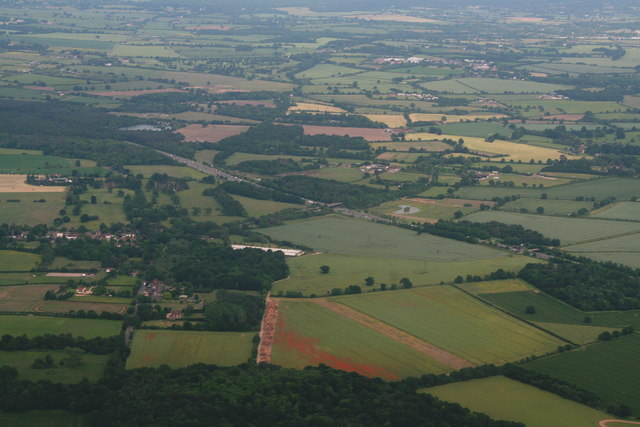
Aerial view of Shurlock Row and the M4

To the south of the village, farmland separates the houses from the M4 motorway. The pub and a garage are found in the centre of the village, amongst the main body of houses. The northern edge of the village is marked by the village pond, which lies next to a crossroads. To the north-west of the pond is the parish cricket ground and to the immediate north-east is Great Martins, a large house and former village brewery.

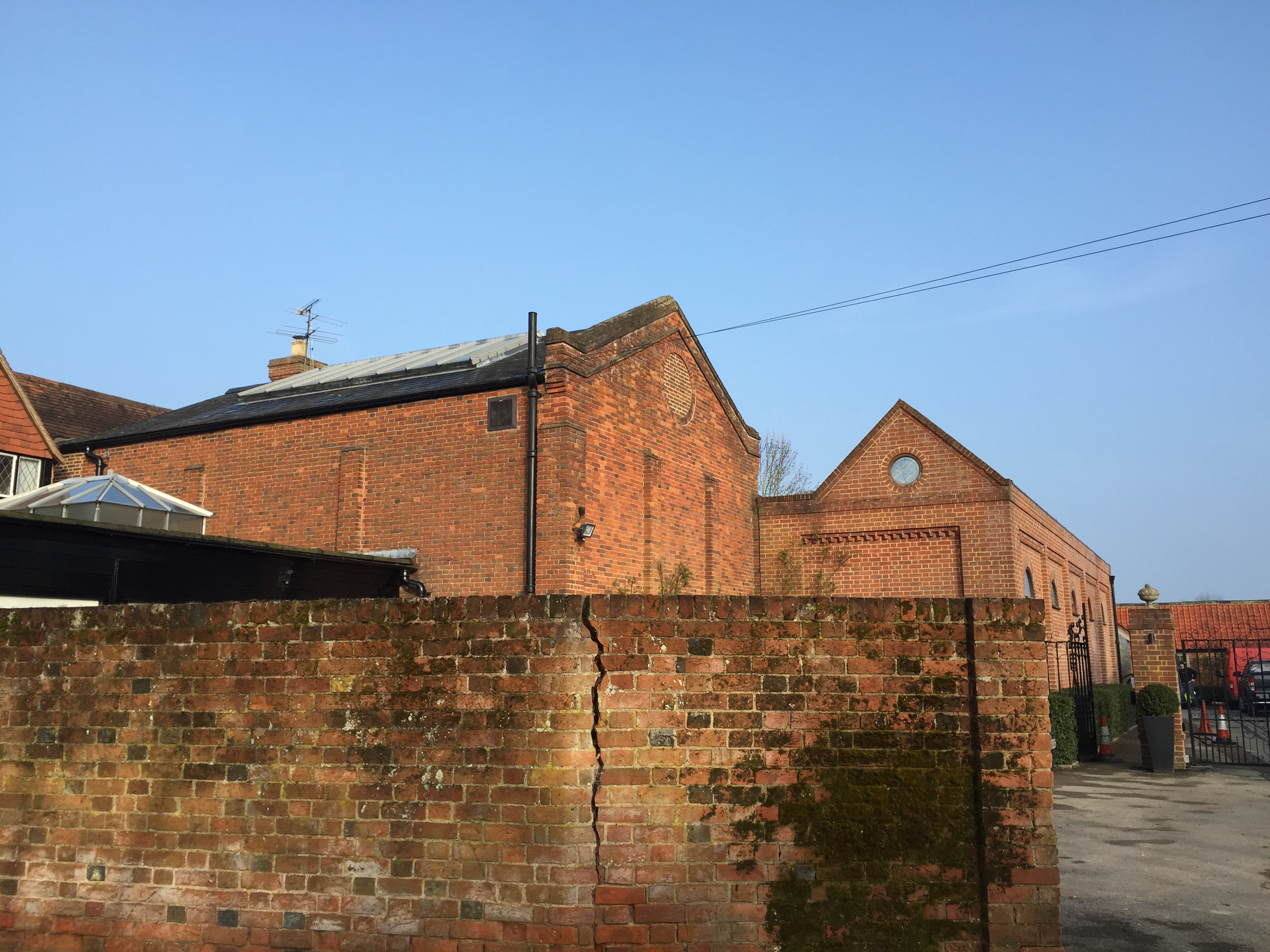
The Old Brewery in Shurlock Row

Due to the surrounding woodland and farmland and its close proximity to London, Shurlock Row is a popular commuter village. Many villagers work in the local towns of Maidenhead, Reading and Bracknell, as well as a number who commute to London regularly. Popular sports in the area include cricket, cycling and horse riding. The village and surrounding area is known for its polo clubs and grounds. Shurlock Row is the home of the Zacara Polo Team, winners of the 2011 Veuve Clicquot Gold Cup for the British Open Polo Championship and the 2012 the U.S. Open Polo Championship.

The other village in the parish, Waltham St Lawrence, is larger and provides a number of amenities that Shurlock Row lacks, including a church and village hall, so many village events and meetings are held there.

== In popular culture ==
"Statistician's Day" by James Blish is set in Shurlock Row.

== Nearby Towns ==
- Henley-on-Thames
- Maidenhead
- Reading
- Ascot
- Bracknell

== Nearby villages ==
- Waltham St Lawrence
- Hurst
- Twyford
- Binfield
