= Biagio Rebecca =

Italian painter (1731–1808)

Biagio Rebecca ARA (1731–1808) was an Italian artist, active mainly as a decorative painter in England.

== Life ==
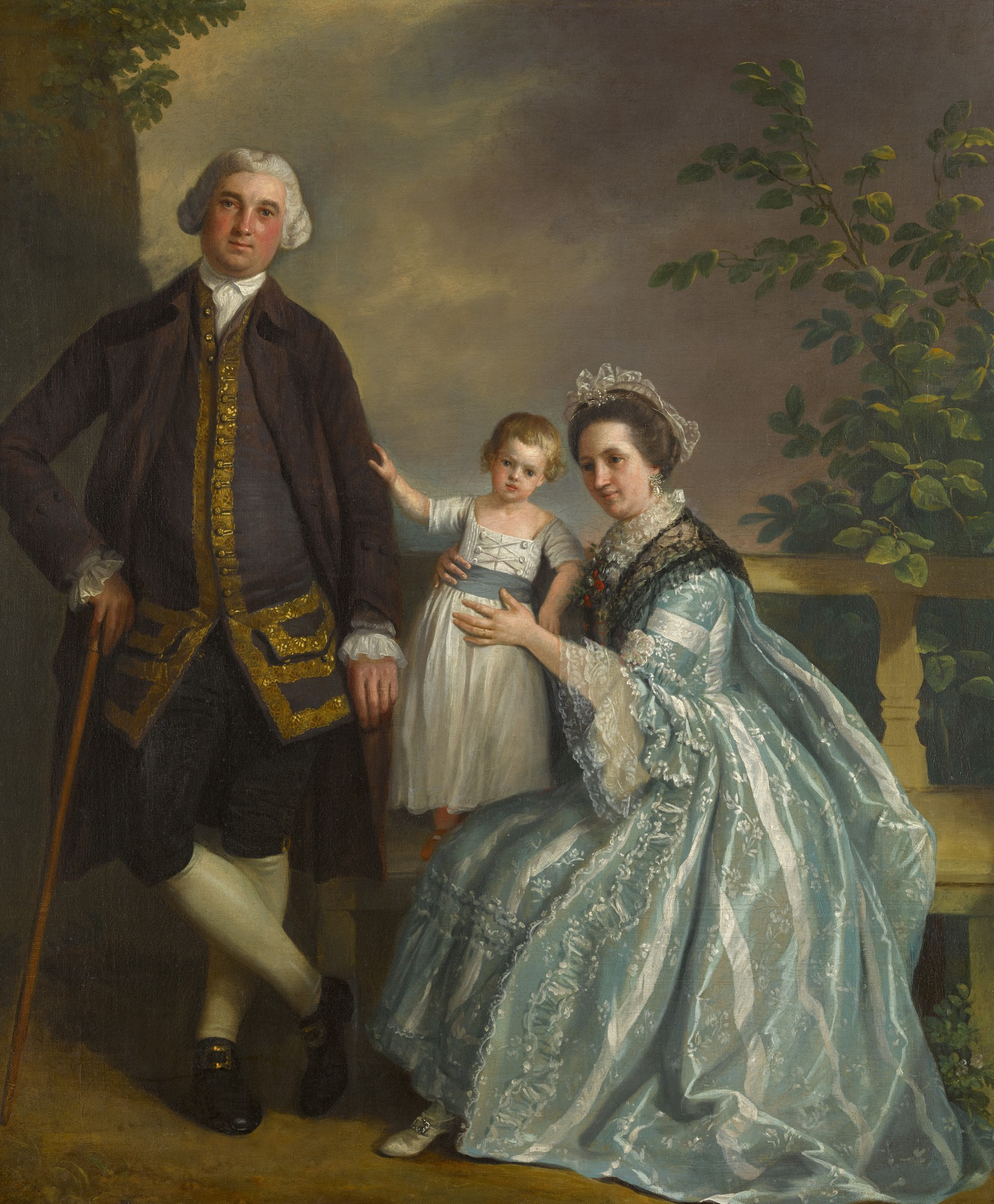
A group portrait of Thomas Bankes with his wife and son by Biagio Rebecca

Rebecca was born at Osimo, near Ancona, in the Marches, Papal States, and served his apprenticeship in Rome.

In England he became known for neoclassical scenes from mythology, often working on decorative schemes in collaboration with Robert Adam, for example at Harewood House and at Kedleston Hall. He also decorated Heaton Hall in Prestwich, near Bury, Lancashire and frescoed a ceiling at the Marine Pavilion at Brighton. With Angelica Kauffman, he painted the old lecture room at Somerset House, then home of the Royal Academy. He also designed a set of stained glass windows in the chapel at New College, Oxford.

He was employed to do some painting at Audley End House by Sir John Griffin. In late 1772 Ann White, a servant at the house, gave birth to his illegitimate son, John Biagio Rebecca. Rebecca acknowledged that he was the father, and agreed to deposit £100 with Griffin for the support of the child, thus absolving himself of any further responsibility to it or its mother. A note in the baptismal register at Saffron Walden describes Rebecca as "a most ingenious artist who was employed by Sir John Griffin, at Audley End, to paint the ceiling & Panels of ye little south drawing Room, & several family portraits in the great Room over the eating Parlor!!!" John Biagio Rebecca became a respected architect.

He exhibited four works at the Royal Academy in 1770–02, and was elected an Associate of the Academy in 1771.

== Opera House ==
One of Rebecca’s schemes appears to have been a realised proposal for the decoration of London’s Italian Opera House, The King’s Theatre (now Her Majesty's Theatre). The scheme is illustrated in two detailed and atmospheric watercolours now in the Royal Collection. One of the watercolours shows the auditorium, and the other shows the new concert room; both were constructed in 1794.

The press described the auditorium – shown by Rebecca - thus: ‘The first tier of boxes is supported by octagon columns of variegated glass, with gilt caps and bases; the parapet, grotesque ornaments, divided into compartments, painted in oil; on canvas, as are those of all the others tiers. The second tier is supported by caryatides, winged syrens, gilt; the parapet, Neptune and Amphitrite, attended by sea gods and goddesses. The third tier is supported by griffins, gilt; the parapet, grotesque ornaments. The fourth tier is supported by rams, gilt; the parapet, grotesque ornaments. The parapet of the boxes on either side of the gallery, balustrades painted on canvas. On the top of the parapets, under each of the caryatides, is a sphinx, gilt.’ The second of Rebecca’s drawings shows the inside of the ‘New Subscription Room’, later known as the concert room. The room was not only a major addition to the theatre’s amenities, but it involved the development of the Haymarket Street façade and the beginnings of a change in the relationship between the Opera House and the city.

These interiors did not last for long, but they mark Rebecca’s contribution to the history of the building.

== Bibliography ==
- Michael Burden. "Biagio Rebecca Draws the London Opera House: London’s Kings Theatre in the 1790s". The Burlington, 161 (May 2019), pp. 364–373.
- Michael Burden. "The Making and Marketing of the Georgian Apotheosis: Carter, Strange, Rebecca, Tresham, and de Loutherbourg". The British Art Journal, 22/1 (2021) pp. 10–17.
- Malise Forbes Adam, "Rebecca, Biagio (1734/5–1808)", in Oxford Dictionary of National Biography, Oxford University Press, 46 (2004), p. 244.
- Cristiano Marchegiani, Le origini italiane di un "faceto" pioniere del Neoclassicismo inglese: Biagio Rebecca da Osimo [Italian origins of a "facetious" pioneer of English Neoclassicism: Biagio Rebecca from Osimo], in "Opus. Quaderno di storia dell'architettura e restauro" [Dipartimento di Architettura - Sezione di Storia dell'Architettura, Restauro e Rappresentazione dell'Università "Gabriele D'Annunzio", Chieti-Pescara], 11 (2011), pp. 83–94.
- Cristiano Marchegiani, "Rebecca, Biagio", in Dizionario Biografico degli Italiani, vol. 86, Roma, Istituto della Enciclopedia Italiana, 2019, on-line; DOI: 10.7393/DBIOL-88.
