= Richard Neville Aldworth Neville =

English politician and diplomat

Richard Neville Aldworth Neville (3 September 1717 – 17 July 1793) was an English politician and diplomat.

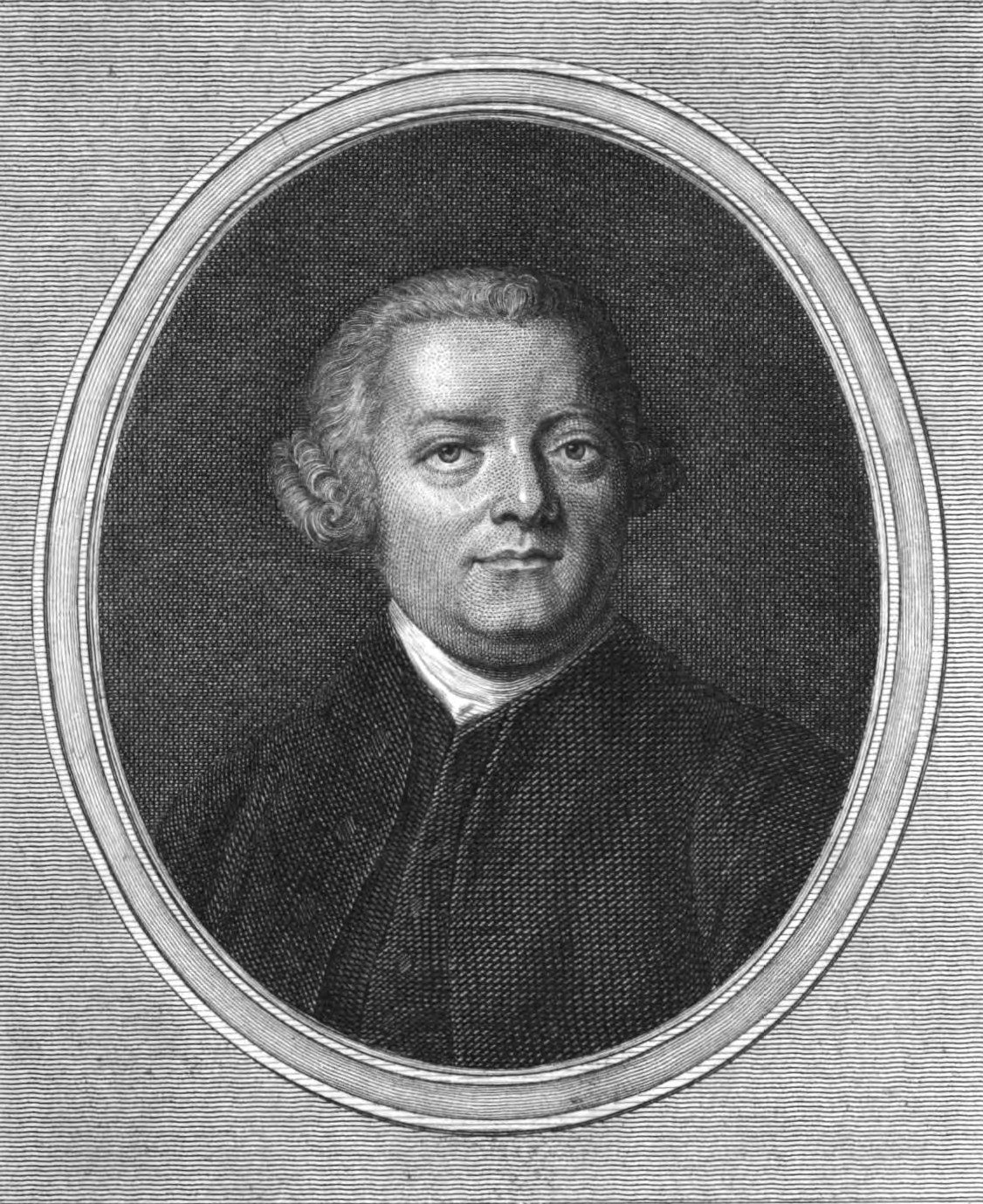
Richard Neville Aldworth Neville

== Life ==
The only son of Richard Aldworth of Stanlake, by Catherine, daughter of Richard Neville of Billingbear House, he was born on 3 September 1717; through his mother he was descended from Sir Henry Neville. He was educated at Eton College, where he was on good terms with Lord Sandwich, Lord Rochford, Lord Orford, Owen Cambridge, and Jacob Bryant. On 12 July 1736 he matriculated at Merton College, Oxford.

Instead of finishing his course at Oxford Aldworth travelled abroad. In 1739 he visited Geneva, and he spent every winter there till 1744, with other English visitors: John Hervey, 2nd Baron Hervey, William Windham Sr., and Benjamin Stillingfleet. He later contributed to William Coxe's Literary life and Select works of Benjamin Stillingfleet (1811).

At the general election of 1747 Neville became Member of Parliament for Reading. He represented Wallingford from 1754 to 1761, and Tavistock from 1761 to 1768, and again till 1774. He joined the Whigs, and had the support of the Duke of Bedford. He was appointed under-secretary of state for the southern department on 13 February 1748, under Bedford, and held office till his chief's resignation, 12 July 1751. He was also joint secretary to the council of regency in 1748 and 1750.

Aldworth assumed the name and arms of Neville in August 1762, when, on the death of the Countess of Portsmouth, widow of his maternal uncle Henry Neville Grey, he succeeded to the estate of Billingbear. On 4 September 1762 he became secretary to the embassy at Paris. Bedford was acting as British plenipotentiary at the conference then summoned to consider the terms of peace between England and France in the Seven Years' War. Walpole credited Neville with causing a delay in the signature of the preliminaries, till the capture of Havana had become known. By way of reward, Neville was made paymaster of the band of pensioners. On 15 February he arrived in England with the definitive treaty, which had been signed on the 10th at Paris.

Billingbear House, Berkshire in 1669

Neville soon returned to Paris to act as plenipotentiary until the arrival of the Earl of Hertford, Bedford's successor, in May 1763. While he was at Compiègne in August, John Wilkes visited him; Louis XV gave him his picture set with diamonds. After his return England he took no significant part in public affairs. He suffered from gout, and died at Billingbear House, after a lingering illness, on 17 July 1793.

He is buried nearby at Ruscombe with a monument sculpted by John Flaxman.

== Family ==
By his wife Magdalen, daughter of Francis Calandrini, first syndic of Geneva, whom he married in 1748, and who died in 1750, Neville had two children: a daughter Frances, who became the wife of Francis Jalabert, and Richard.
