= Henry Neville (died 1615) =

English courtier, politician and diplomat (1564–1615)

Sir Henry Neville
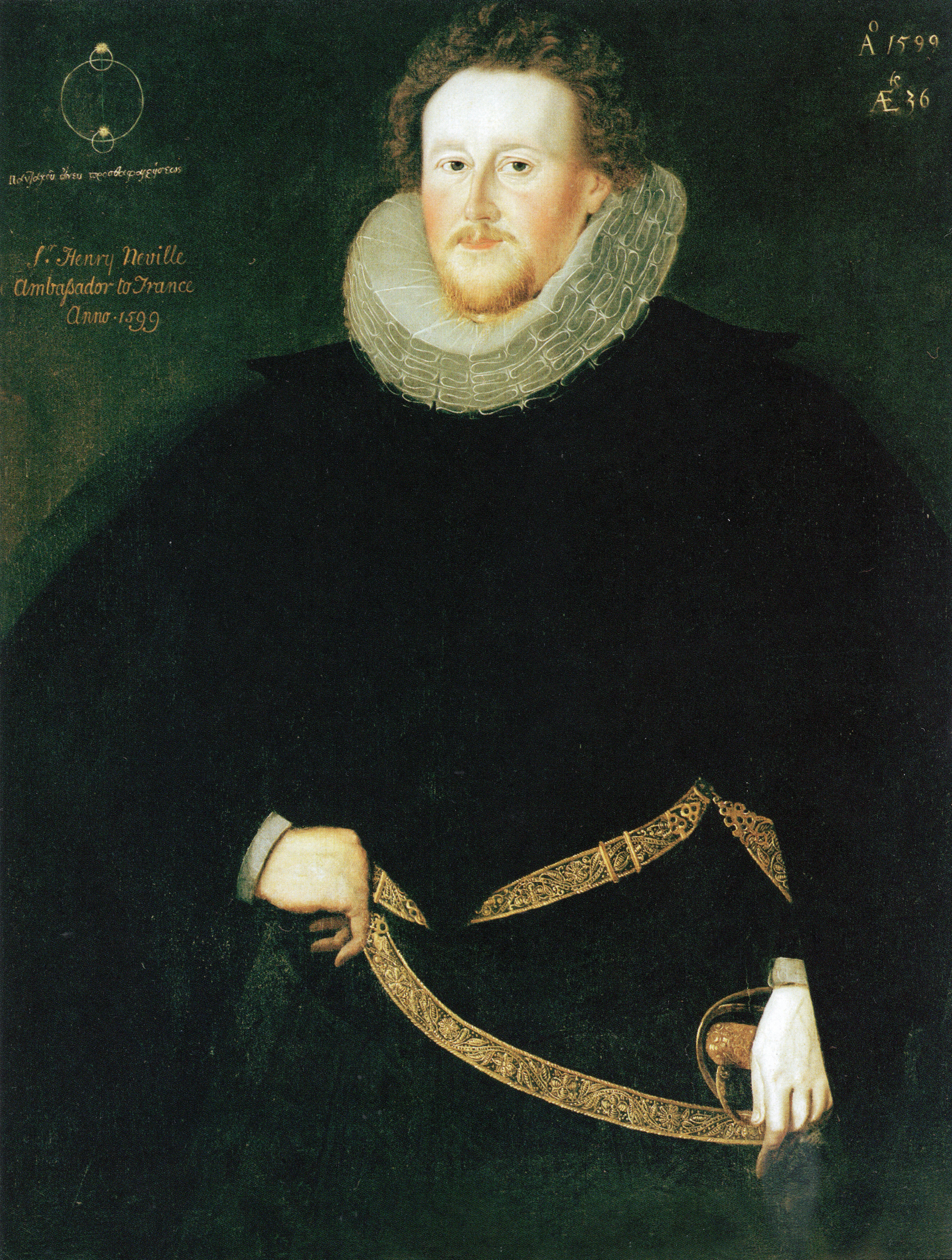
- Baptised: 20 May 1564
- Died: 10 July 1615 (aged 51–52)
- Spouse: Anne Killigrew
- Children: 12
- Parent(s): Henry Neville, Elizabeth Gresham

Sir Henry Neville (baptised 20 May 1564 – 10 July 1615) was an English courtier, politician and diplomat, noted for his role as ambassador to France and his unsuccessful attempts to negotiate between King James and the Houses of Parliament. In 2005, Neville was put forward as a candidate for the authorship of Shakespeare's works.

== Family ==
Neville was the elder son of Sir Henry Neville (died 1593) and his second wife, Elizabeth Gresham (died 6 November 1573), granddaughter of Sir Richard Gresham, Lord Mayor of London, and only daughter and heir of the latter's elder son, John Gresham (died 1560), by Frances Thwaytes, the daughter and coheir of Sir Henry Thwaytes of Lund, Yorkshire.

Neville's father had earlier married, between 1551 and 1555, Winifred Losse (died in or before 1561), daughter of a property speculator, Hugh Losse (died 1555) of Whitchurch, London, by whom he had no children.

After the death of his second wife, Neville's father married thirdly, about May 1578, Elizabeth Bacon (c. 1541 – 3 May 1621), widow of Sir Robert Doyley (died between 21 and 29 July 1577) of Chislehampton, Oxfordshire, and Greenlands in Hambleden, Buckinghamshire. Elizabeth Bacon was the eldest daughter of Queen Elizabeth's Lord Keeper of the Great Seal, Sir Nicholas Bacon (1510–1579), by his first wife, Jane Ferneley (died 1552), the daughter of William Ferneley of Suffolk. After Neville's death, his widow, Elizabeth, married, before the end of September 1595, Sir William Peryam (died 9 October 1604). She made her last will on 12 November 1618 and died on 3 May 1621. There is a monument to her in the church of St Mary's Henley-on-Thames.

Neville's father was a great-great-grandson of Ralph Neville, 1st Earl of Westmorland and Joan Beaufort, Countess of Westmoreland, the daughter of John of Gaunt, Duke of Lancaster, by Katherine Swynford.

== Career ==
Billingbear House, Berkshire, in 1669. (1821 engraving derived from a 17th-century manuscript illustration).

Neville grew up at Billingbear House at Waltham St Lawrence in Berkshire. At the age of fifteen, he matriculated from Merton College, Oxford, on 20 December 1577. His tutor was Henry Savile, later warden of Merton.

In 1578 Neville accompanied Savile on a continental tour, visiting Padua, Venice, and Prague and meeting scientists and humanists, including Johannes Praetorius, Andreas Dudith, and Gian Vincenzo Pinelli.

Neville sat in Parliament as the member for New Windsor (1584, 1586 and 1593), Sussex (1589), Liskeard (1597) and Berkshire (1604, 1614). He served as High Sheriff of Berkshire in 1595. Before his father's death, he lived at the old Archbishop's Palace at Mayfield in Sussex, inherited from his great-uncle Sir Thomas Gresham (died 1579), where he ran a highly successful cannon manufactury. He was appointed Deputy Lieutenant of Berkshire in 1596 and moved to Billingbear the next year. He was knighted in 1599.

In 1599, Neville was appointed Ambassador to France and attended the court of Henri IV. Although knighted for his services in France, he was unhappy with the way he was treated by the French and in 1600, complaining of deafness, he asked to be recalled to England.

After his return he became involved with the Essex Rebellion of 1601 and was imprisoned in the Tower of London. His close friend Henry Wriothesley, 3rd Earl of Southampton, was also imprisoned there at this time in connection with the plot.

He was stripped of his position and fined £5,000, which he agreed to pay in annual instalments of £1,000. After the death of Elizabeth I and the accession of James I a Royal Warrant was issued for his release.

In June 1604 Neville was briefly arrested with the Earl of Southampton and Lord Danvers amid rumours of a plot against Scots close to James I, but the three men were released after examination the following day. He continued to played a greater role in the political life of the nation, but earned the antagonism of King James by advocating the King surrender to the demands of the House of Commons.

In the first session of 1610, and again in 1612, he advised the king to give way to the demands of the House of Commons. It was these actions that, on the death of Robert Cecil, 1st Earl of Salisbury, in May 1612, lost him the possibility of becoming the Secretary of State. Although offered the position of Treasurer of the Chamber he turned it down.

Neville died in 1615 and was buried at the church of St Lawrence in Waltham St Lawrence.

== Shakespeare authorship ==
In 2005, Neville was proposed as the actual author of Shakespeare's works. The attribution is rejected by almost all academic Shakespeareans who have responded to the claim.

== Marriage and issue ==
In December 1584, Neville married Anne Killigrew (died 1632), the daughter of Henry Killigrew (died 1603) and Catherine Cooke, sister-in-law of William Cecil, 1st Baron Burghley, by whom he had five sons and six daughters:

- Sir Henry Neville (II), 1588–29 June 1629, married Elizabeth Smyth; among his children were Richard Neville (soldier) and Henry Neville.
- Catherine Neville, c. 1590–1650, married Sir Richard Brooke.
- Frances Neville, 1592–1659, married Sir Richard Worsley, 1st Baronet then Jerome Brett.
- Mary Neville, NK – 28 October 1642, married Sir Edward Lewknor.
- William Neville, 1596–1640, second son, married Catherine Billingley, issue unknown.
- [son died shortly after birth, September 1599]
- Edward Neville, 1602–1632, married Alice Pryor, issue.
- Robert Neville, 1604-NK
- Dorothy Neville, 1605–1673, married Richard Catlin.
- Charles Neville, 1607–1626, probably unmarried.
- Richard Neville, 1608–1644, married unknown, issue.
- Elizabeth Neville, NK – 4 January 1657, married William Glover, then Sir Henry Berkeley, then Thomas Duke.
- Anne Neville, 1610-NK.

== Notes ==
Political offices
Preceded by Sir Edward Norreys	Custos Rotulorum of Berkshire bef. 1605–1615	Succeeded by Sir Francis Moore
