= Pliny the Younger =

Roman lawyer, author and magistrate (61 – c. 113)

- Gaius Plinius Caecilius Secundus
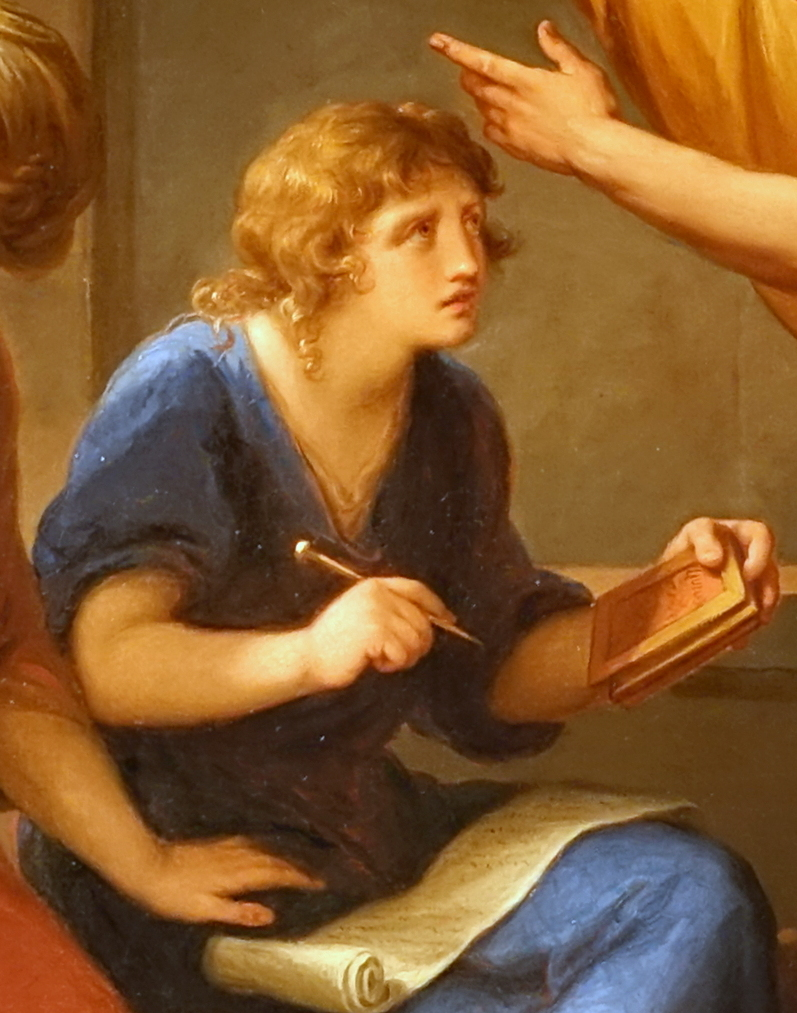
- Detail from Pliny the Younger and His Mother at Miseno by Angelica Kauffman, 1785
- Born: Gaius Caecilius Cilo; AD 61; Novum Comum, Italia, Roman Empire
- Died: c. AD 113 (aged c. 52); Bithynia, Roman Empire
- Occupations: Politician, judge, author
- Notable work: Epistulae
- Relatives: Pliny the Elder (uncle, later adoptive father)

Gaius Plinius Caecilius Secundus (born Gaius Caecilius or Gaius Caecilius Cilo; 61 – c. 113), better known in English as Pliny the Younger (/ˈplɪni/ PLIN-ee), was a lawyer, author, and magistrate of Ancient Rome. Pliny's uncle, Pliny the Elder, helped raise and educate him.

Pliny the Younger wrote 369 letters, of which 247 survived, and which are of some historical value. These include 121 official letters addressed to Emperor Trajan (reigned 98–117). Some are addressed to reigning emperors or to notables such as the historian Tacitus. Pliny served as an imperial magistrate under Trajan, and his letters to Trajan provide one of the few surviving records of the relationship between the imperial office and provincial governors.

Pliny rose through a series of civil and military offices, the cursus honorum. He was a friend of the historian Tacitus and might have employed the biographer Suetonius on his staff. Pliny also came into contact with other well-known men of the period, including the philosophers Artemidorus and Euphrates the Stoic, during his time in Syria.

== Background ==
=== Childhood ===
Pliny the Younger was born in Novum Comum (Como, Northern Italy) around 61 AD, the son of Lucius Caecilius Cilo, born there, and his wife Plinia Marcella, a sister of Pliny the Elder. He was the grandson of Senator and landowner Gaius Caecilius, revered his uncle, who at this time was extremely famous around the Roman Empire because of his intelligence, and provided sketches of how his uncle worked on the Naturalis Historia.

Cilo died at an early age when Pliny was still young. As a result, the boy probably lived with his mother. His guardian and preceptor in charge of his education was Lucius Verginius Rufus, famed for quelling a revolt against Nero in 68 AD. After being first tutored at home, Pliny went to Rome for further education. There he was taught rhetoric by Quintilian, a great teacher and author, and Nicetes Sacerdos of Smyrna. It was at this time that Pliny became closer to his uncle Pliny the Elder. When Pliny the Younger was 17 or 18 in 79 AD, his uncle Pliny the Elder died attempting to rescue victims of the Vesuvius eruption, and the terms of the Elder Pliny's will passed his estate to his nephew. In the same document, the younger Pliny was adopted by his uncle. As a result, Pliny the Younger changed his name from Gaius Caecilius Cilo to Gaius Plinius Caecilius Secundus (his official title was Gaius Plinius Luci filius Caecilius Secundus).

There is some evidence that Pliny had a sibling. A memorial erected in Como (now CIL V, 5279) repeats the terms of a will by which the aedile Lucius Caecilius Cilo, son of Lucius, established a fund, the interest of which was to buy oil (used for soap) for the baths of the people of Como. The trustees are apparently named in the inscription: "L. Caecilius Valens and P. Caecilius Secundus, sons of Lucius, and the contubernalis Lutulla." The word contubernalis describing Lutulla is the military term meaning "tent-mate", which can only mean that she was living with Lucius, not as his wife. The first man mentioned, L. Caecilius Valens, is probably the older son. Pliny the Younger confirms that he was a trustee for the largesse "of my ancestors". It seems unknown to Pliny the Elder, so Valens' mother was probably not his sister Plinia; perhaps Valens was Lutulla's son from an earlier relationship.

=== Marriages ===
Pliny the Younger married three times: first, when he was very young (about 18), to a stepdaughter of Veccius Proculus, who died at age 37; secondly, at an unknown date, to the daughter of Pompeia Celerina; and thirdly to Calpurnia who was 14 at the time and 26 years younger than Pliny, daughter of Calpurnius and granddaughter of Calpurnius Fabatus of Comum. Letters survive in which Pliny recorded this last marriage taking place, his attachment to Calpurnia, and his sadness when she miscarried their child at the age of 17.

=== Death ===
Pliny is thought to have died suddenly during his convention in Bithynia-Pontus, around 113 AD, since no events referred to in his letters date later than that.

== Career ==
Pliny was by birth of equestrian rank, that is, a member of the aristocratic order of equites (knights), the lower (beneath the senatorial order) of the two Roman aristocratic orders that monopolised senior civil and military offices during the early Empire. His career began at the age of 18 and initially followed a normal equestrian route. But, unlike most equestrians, he achieved entry into the upper order by being elected Quaestor in his late twenties. (See Career summary below.)

Pliny was active in the Roman legal system, especially in the sphere of the Roman centumviral court, which dealt with inheritance cases. Later, he was a well-known prosecutor and defender at the trials of a series of provincial governors, including Baebius Massa, governor of Baetica; Marius Priscus, governor of Africa; Gaius Caecilius Classicus, governor of Baetica; and most ironically in light of his later appointment to this province, Gaius Julius Bassus and Varenus Rufus, both governors of Bithynia and Pontus.

Pliny's career is commonly considered as a summary of the main Roman public charges and is the best-documented example from this period, offering proof for many aspects of imperial culture. Effectively, Pliny crossed all the principal fields of the organization of the early Roman Empire. It is an achievement for a man to have not only survived the reigns of several disparate emperors, especially the much-detested Domitian, but also to have risen in rank throughout.

=== Career summary ===
Year (AD)	Office
c. 81	One of the presiding judges in the centumviral court (decemvir litibus iudicandis)
c. 81	Tribunus militum (staff officer) of Legio III Gallica in Syria, probably for six months
80s	Officer of the noble order of knights (sevir equitum Romanorum)
Later 80s	Entered the Senate
88 or 89	Quaestor attached to the Emperor's staff (quaestor imperatoris)
91	Tribune of the People (tribunus plebis)
93	Praetor
94–96	Prefect of the military treasury (praefectus aerarii militaris)
98–100	Prefect of the treasury of Saturn (praefectus aerari Saturni)
100	Suffect consul with Cornutus Tertullus
103–104	Publicly elected Augur
104–106	Superintendent for the banks of the Tiber (curator alvei Tiberis)
104–107	Three times a member of Trajan's judicial council.
c.110	The imperial governor (legatus Augusti) of Bithynia et Pontus province

== Writings ==
Pliny wrote his first work, a tragedy in Greek, at age 14. Additionally, in the course of his life, he wrote numerous poems, most of which are lost. He was also known as a notable orator; though he professed himself a follower of Cicero, Pliny's prose was more magniloquent and less direct than Cicero's.

Pliny's only oration that now survives is the Panegyricus Traiani. This was delivered in the Senate in 100 and is a description of Trajan's figure and actions in an adulatory and emphatic form, especially contrasting him with the Emperor Domitian. It is, however, a relevant document that reveals many details about the Emperor's actions in several fields of his administrative power such as taxes, justice, military discipline, and commerce. Recalling the speech in one of his letters, Pliny shrewdly defines his own motives thus:

I hoped in the first place to encourage our Emperor in his virtues by a sincere tribute and, secondly, to show his successors what path to follow to win the same renown, not by offering instruction but by setting his example before them. To proffer advice on an Emperor's duties might be a noble enterprise, but it would be a heavy responsibility verging on insolence, whereas to praise an excellent ruler (optimum principem) and thereby shine a beacon on the path posterity should follow would be equally effective without appearing presumptuous.

=== Epistulae ===
The largest surviving body of Pliny's work is his 247 Epistulae, divided into ten books. The first nine books contain letters to his friends and associates, while Book 10, which contains Pliny's official correspondence with the emperor Trajan, is generally considered to have been published posthumously. These letters are a unique testimony of Roman administrative history and everyday life in the 1st century AD. Especially noteworthy among the letters are two in which he describes the eruption of Mount Vesuvius on August or October 24 in AD 79, during which his uncle Pliny the Elder died (Epistulae VI.16, VI.20), and one in which he asks the Emperor for instructions regarding official policy concerning Christians (Epistulae X.96).

==== Epistles concerning the eruption of Mount Vesuvius ====
Pliny wrote the two letters describing the eruption of Mount Vesuvius approximately 25 years after the event, and both were sent in response to the request of his friend, the historian Tacitus. The first letter outlines the events preceding the death of Pliny the Elder during the attempted rescue of his friend Rectina. The second letter details the Younger's movements across the same period of time. The two letters have great historical value due to their accurate description of the Vesuvius eruption; Pliny's attention to detail in the letters about Vesuvius is so keen that modern volcanologists describe those types of eruptions as "Plinian eruptions".

==== Epistle concerning the Christian religion ====
Reading of Pliny's letter to Trajan about the Christians, in Latin with English subtitles

As the Roman governor of Bithynia-Pontus (now in modern Turkey) Pliny wrote a letter to Emperor Trajan around 112 AD and asked for counsel on dealing with Christians. In the letter (Epistulae X.96), Pliny detailed an account of how he conducted trials of suspected Christians who appeared before him as a result of anonymous accusations and asked for the Emperor's guidance on how they should be treated. Pliny had never performed a legal investigation of Christians and thus consulted Trajan in order to be on solid ground regarding his actions. Pliny saved his letters and Trajan's replies and these are the earliest surviving Roman documents to refer to early Christians.

==== Epistle concerning voting systems ====
Voting theorists and historians of social choice note Pliny's early mention of how the choice of voting procedure could influence the outcome of an election. On June 24, 105, Pliny wrote a letter to Titius Aristo, where he describes a criminal trial: under the traditional rules of the Senate, there would first be a vote on guilt and then (if the accused were found guilty) on punishment, for which execution and exile were proposed. Of the three distinct proposals, acquittal, exile, and execution, acquittal had the largest number of supporters but not a majority, although exile would have defeated either acquittal or execution in a direct two-way vote. Pliny supported acquittal but anticipated that first guilt and then execution would be chosen under the traditional rules, and so he argued for a novel three-way plurality vote, which would have resulted in acquittal. In response, those in favor of execution withdrew their proposal, the vote defaulted to a traditional majority vote between exile and acquittal, and exile carried.

=== Manuscripts ===
The first edition of Pliny's Epistles was published in Italy in 1471. Sometime between 1495 and 1500 Giovanni Giocondo discovered a manuscript in Paris of Pliny's tenth book of letters, containing his correspondence with Trajan, and published it in Paris, dedicating the work to Louis XII. The first complete edition was produced by the press of Aldus Manutius in 1508. (See Editio princeps for details.)

== Villas, farms and estates ==
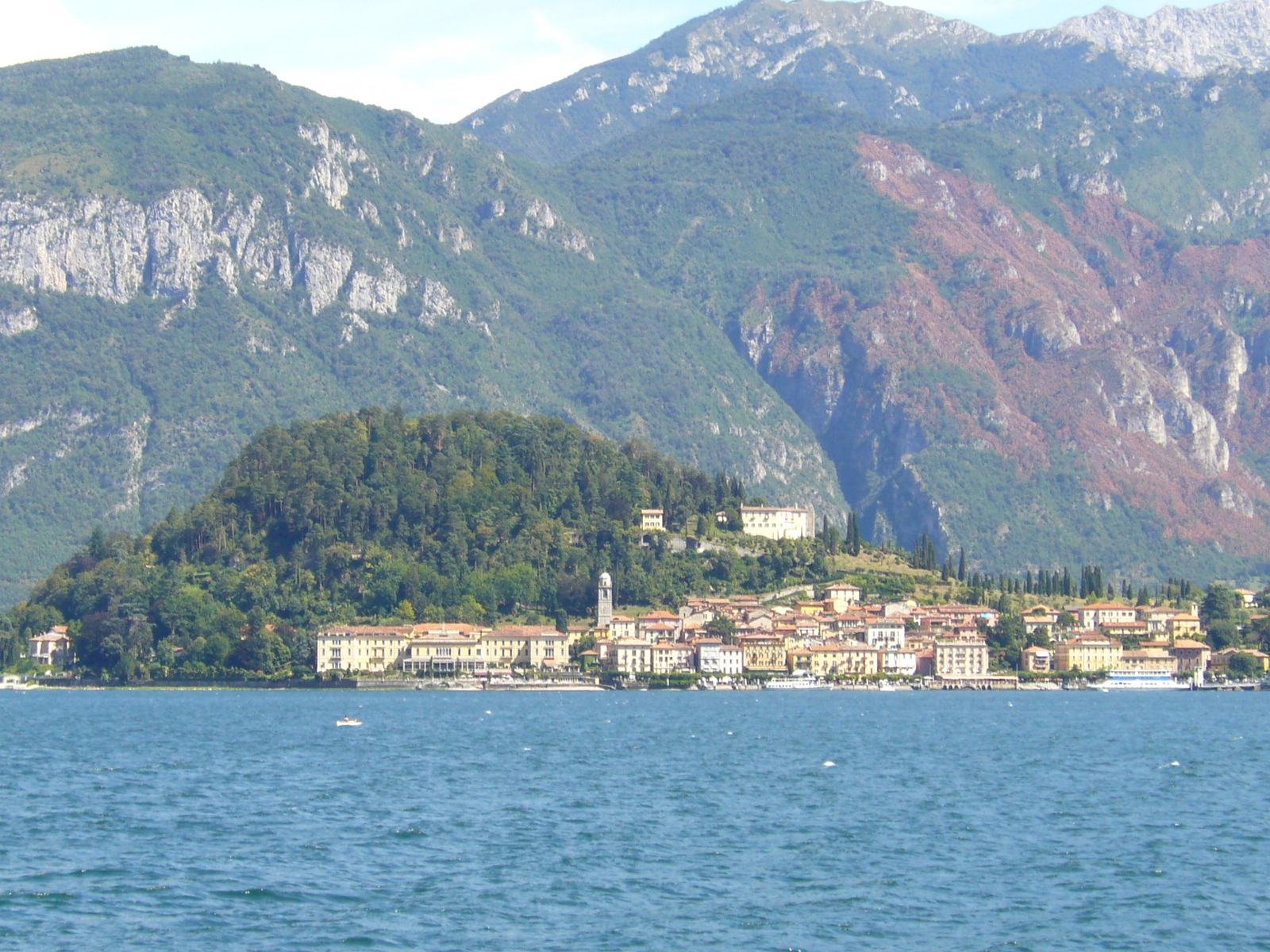
View of Bellagio in Lake Como. The institution on the hill is Villa Serbelloni, believed to have been constructed on the site of Pliny's villa "Tragedy."

Being wealthy, Pliny owned many villas and wrote in detail about his villa near Ostia, at Laurentum, Italy. Others included one near Lake Como named "Tragedy" because of its location high on a hill, and, another, "Comedy," on the shores of the lake, so called because it was sited low down, referencing the practice of actors in comedy wearing flat shoes, while those in tragedy wore high-heeled buskins.

Pliny's main estate in Italy and the one he loved best was his Villa "in Tuscis" near San Giustino, Umbria, under the passes of Bocca Trabaria and Bocca Serriola, where wood was harvested for Roman ships and sent to Rome via the Tiber.

As a response to "declining returns from his north Italian farms", Pliny may have contemplated switching the administration of his estate to a sharecropping system called colonia partiaria. Under the sharecropping system, Pliny's slaves would act as overseers.

== See also ==
- Herculaneum
- Misenum
- Pompeii
- Stabiae

Political offices
Preceded by Quintus Acutius Nerva, and Lucius Fabius Tuscus as suffect consul	Suffect Consul of the Roman Empire; 100 with Gaius Julius Cornutus Tertullus	Succeeded by Lucius Roscius Aelianus Maecius Celer, and Tiberius Claudius Sacerdos Julianus as suffect consul
