= Wheelbarrow riots =

1897 tax riots in Shanghai, China

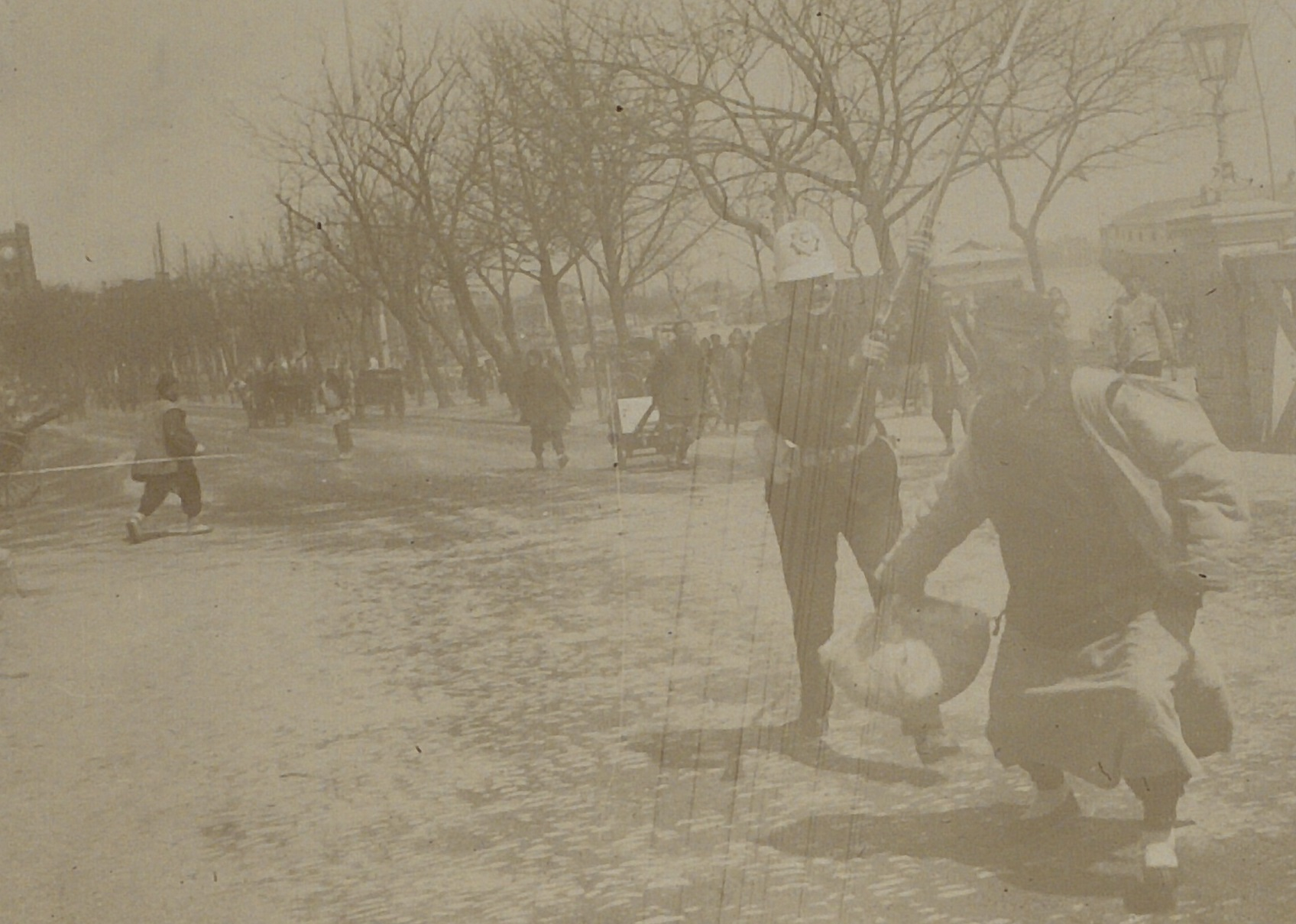
A Western volunteer pushing a Chinese man during the riots (photograph taken by Louis Dumoulin).

The wheelbarrow riots are riots that took place in Shanghai in April 1897 against the Western-controlled Shanghai Municipal Council.

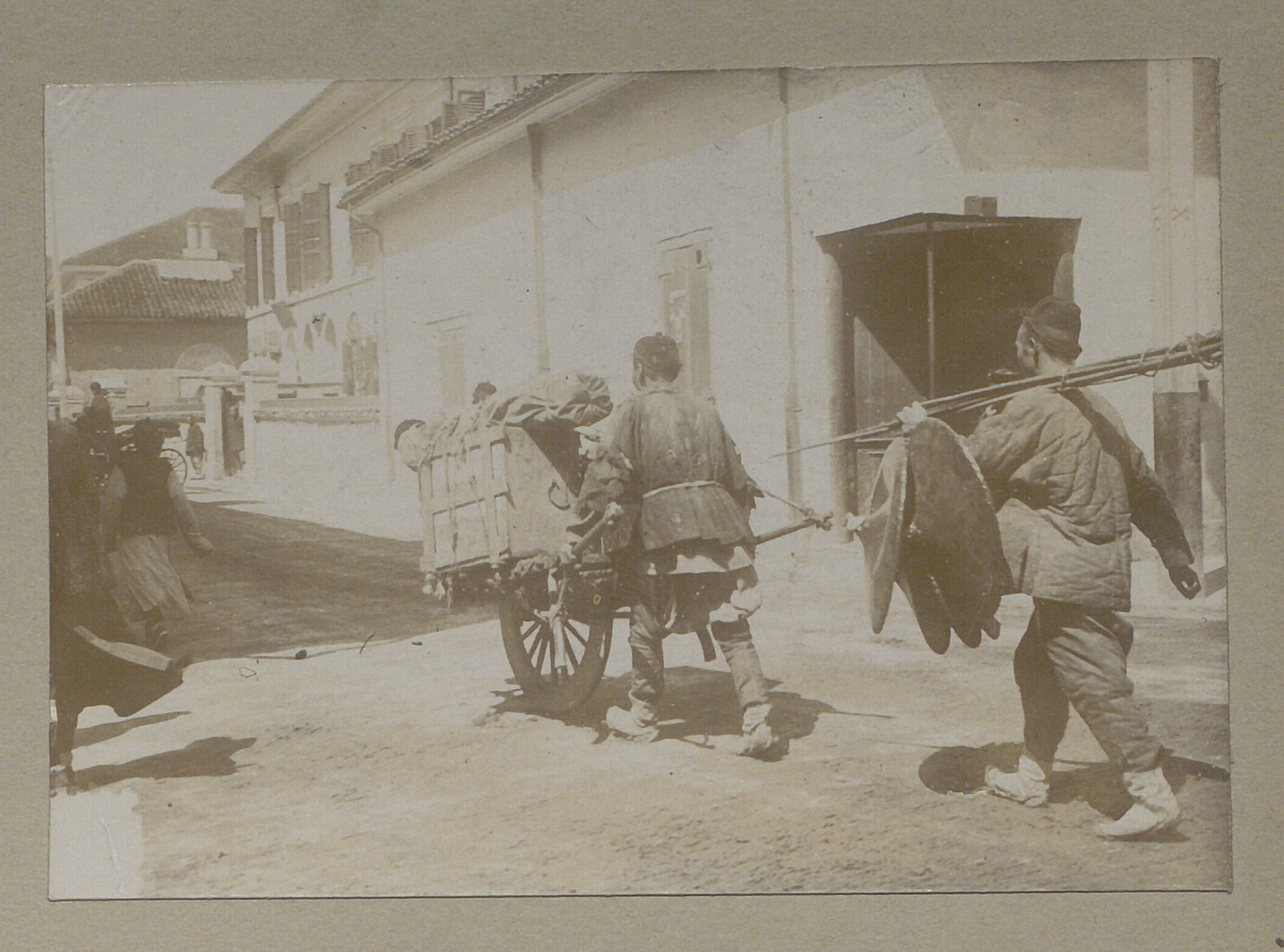
A wheelbarrow puller in Shanghai.

The Municipal Council of the Shanghai International Settlement decided to increase licence taxes on native wheelbarrow pullers. Around 700 to 800 workers from northern Jiangsu lead several violent demonstrations. The International Police, sailors from visiting warships and the Shanghai Volunteer Corps were involved in the crackdown, which resulted in deaths on both sides. The rebels failed to organize their actions, and in the end obtained only a three-month reprieve from the implementation of the tax.
