= Billingbear House =

Former country house in Southern England

Coordinates: 51.445°N 0.807°W

Billingbear House, Berkshire, in 1669. (1821 engraving derived from a 17th-century manuscript illustration).

Billingbear House was an English country house situated in the parish of Waltham St. Lawrence in Berkshire, England, about six miles from Windsor.

Originally owned by the Bishop of Winchester, the land was given to Sir Henry Neville (father of politician and diplomat, Sir Henry Neville) in 1549 by King Edward VI. He finally took possession in 1567 and began construction of a Tudor mansion.

With the identification in 2005 of the younger Sir Henry Neville as a candidate for the authorship of the Shakespearean plays and sonnets, it is conceivable that some of those works might have been composed at Billingbear. It has been noted that the play The Merry Wives of Windsor displays a knowledge of local towns, a Windsor inn, and a local tale called Herne the Hunter.

When the house was visited by Cosimo III de' Medici, Grand Duke of Tuscany and Lorenzo Magalotti in 1669, their host was Colonel John Neville. A member of the duke's retinue painted a view of the house during the two-day stay, which is one of various images to be found in an illustrated manuscript in the Laurentian Library, Florence. An English translation of this manuscript was published in London in 1821; Indian ink copies of the original 17th-century paintings, by Thomas Hosmer Shepherd, were reproduced as scaled-down engravings for inclusion in this publication.

The house stood until 1924, when it was destroyed by fire, and the shell then torn down. The surviving architectural features were used to restore the dilapidated Bulmershe Court, also in Berkshire, in 1925. One room of Billingbear House was transported to the United States in the early 20th century and survives today at Pace College in Manhattan, near the New York City Hall. It is reputedly haunted.
