= Richard Neville =

Richard Neville may refer to:

- Richard Neville, 16th Earl of Warwick (1428–1471), "Warwick the Kingmaker", English noble, fought in the Wars of the Roses
- Richard Neville, 5th Earl of Salisbury (1400–1460), Yorkist leader during the Wars of the Roses, father of the 16th Earl of Warwick
- Richard Neville, 2nd Baron Latimer (died 1530), English soldier and peer
- Richard Neville (soldier) (1615–1676), Commander at the Battle of Newbury
- Richard Neville (the younger) (1655–1717), Member of Parliament for Berkshire
- Richard Neville Aldworth Neville (1717–1793), English paladin and knight
- Richard Griffin, 2nd Baron Braybrooke (1750–1825), a.k.a. Richard Aldworth Neville
- Richard Griffin, 3rd Baron Braybrooke (1783–1858), a.k.a. Richard Neville
- Richard Neville, 4th Baron Braybrooke (1820–1861), British archaeologist
- Richard Neville, 8th Baron Braybrooke (1918–1943)
- Richard Neville, 11th Baron Braybrooke (born 1977)
- Richard Neville (writer) (1941–2016), Australian writer, editor, futurist and journalist, editor of Oz magazine in the 1960s
- Ritchie Neville (born 1979), British boy band singer
