= Henry Neville (cricketer) =

English cricketer and British Army officer

Personal information
- Full name: Henry Aldworth Neville
- Born: 26 October 1824; Waltham St Lawrence, Berkshire, England
- Died: 5 November 1854 (aged 30); Inkerman, Russian Empire
- Batting: Unknown

Domestic team information
- Years: Team
- 1844: Marylebone Cricket Club

Career statistics
Competition	First-class
Matches	1
Runs scored	5
Batting average	2.50
100s/50s	–/–
Top score	5
Catches/stumpings	–/–
- Source: Cricinfo, 12 June 2021

The Hon. Henry Aldworth Neville (26 October 1824 – 5 November 1854) was an English first-class cricketer and British Army officer.

The son of Richard Griffin, 3rd Baron Braybrooke, he was born on 26 October 1824 at Waltham St Lawrence, Berkshire. He was educated at Eton College. After finishing his education at Eton, he proceeded to purchased the ranks of ensign and lieutenant in the Grenadier Guards in September 1842. Neville played first-class cricket for the Marylebone Cricket Club (MCC) in 1844, making a single appearance against Oxford University at Lord's. He batted twice in the match, being run out for 0 in the MCC first innings, while in their second innings he was dismissed for 5 runs by Gerald Yonge. He later purchased the rank of lieutenant and captain in October 1846. Neville served in the Crimean War, during which he was killed in action at the Battle of Inkerman on 5 November 1854. His elder brother, Richard, succeeded their father as the 4th Baron Braybrooke in 1858.
