= Latimer Neville, 6th Baron Braybrooke =

British peer, clergyman

Latimer Neville, 6th Baron Braybrooke (22 April 1827 – 12 January 1904), styled the Hon. Latimer Neville until 1902, was a British peer, clergyman and academic, who was Master of Magdalene College, Cambridge, for half a century.

Neville was the fourth son of Richard Griffin, 3rd Baron Braybrooke and Lady Jane Cornwallis, daughter of Charles Cornwallis, 2nd Marquess Cornwallis. One of five brothers and three sisters, he grew up at Audley End House, where in 2014 the nursery was restored to how it was in their childhood. He was educated at Eton College and Magdalene College, Cambridge, matriculating in 1845 aged 18, gaining a Fellowship in 1848, and graduating M.A. with a second in the Classical Tripos in 1849. He was ordained deacon in 1850 and priest in 1851. Having briefly served as curate at Waltham St Lawrence in Berkshire, where his family owned the estate of Billingbear House, he was appointed rector of Heydon in Essex in 1851. He was also rural dean of Saffron Walden from 1873 to 1879 and as honorary canon of St Albans Cathedral from 1873 to 1904.

The owners of Audley End were hereditary Visitors to Magdalene College, with the right of presenting to the Mastership. Neville's grandfather, the 2nd Baron Braybrooke, had appointed his younger son, George Neville-Grenville, to the position in 1813. In 1846 Neville-Grenville was appointed Dean of Windsor but retained the Mastership of Magdalene College until his death in 1853, at which point Neville was appointed. Between them, Neville and his uncle Neville-Grenville held the Mastership for 90 years. In June 1853, six months before becoming Master, Neville had married Lucy Frances Le Marchant. In 1854, he lost two brothers Henry and Grey, who both died from wounds received while fighting in the Crimean War.

Although leader of the Conservative Party in Cambridge, he oversaw reforms in the university during his term as Vice-Chancellor from 1859-1961.. During his fifty years Mastership, he occasionally served as the Bursar or Dean. He succeeded his brother Charles Neville, 5th Baron Braybrooke as the 6th Baron in 1902 and inherited the estate of Audley End. He resigned from the living at Heydon on succeeding to the title.

Neville died at the Master's Lodge at Magdalene College on 12 January 1904 and was buried at Littlebury. He was succeeded in the title by his eldest son Henry.

Academic offices
Preceded by George Neville-Grenville	Master of Magdalene College, Cambridge; 1853–1904	Succeeded by Stuart Alexander Donaldson
Peerage of Great Britain
Preceded by Charles Cornwallis Neville	Baron Braybrooke; 1902–1904	Succeeded by Henry Neville
