= Audley End House =

Country house and former royal residence

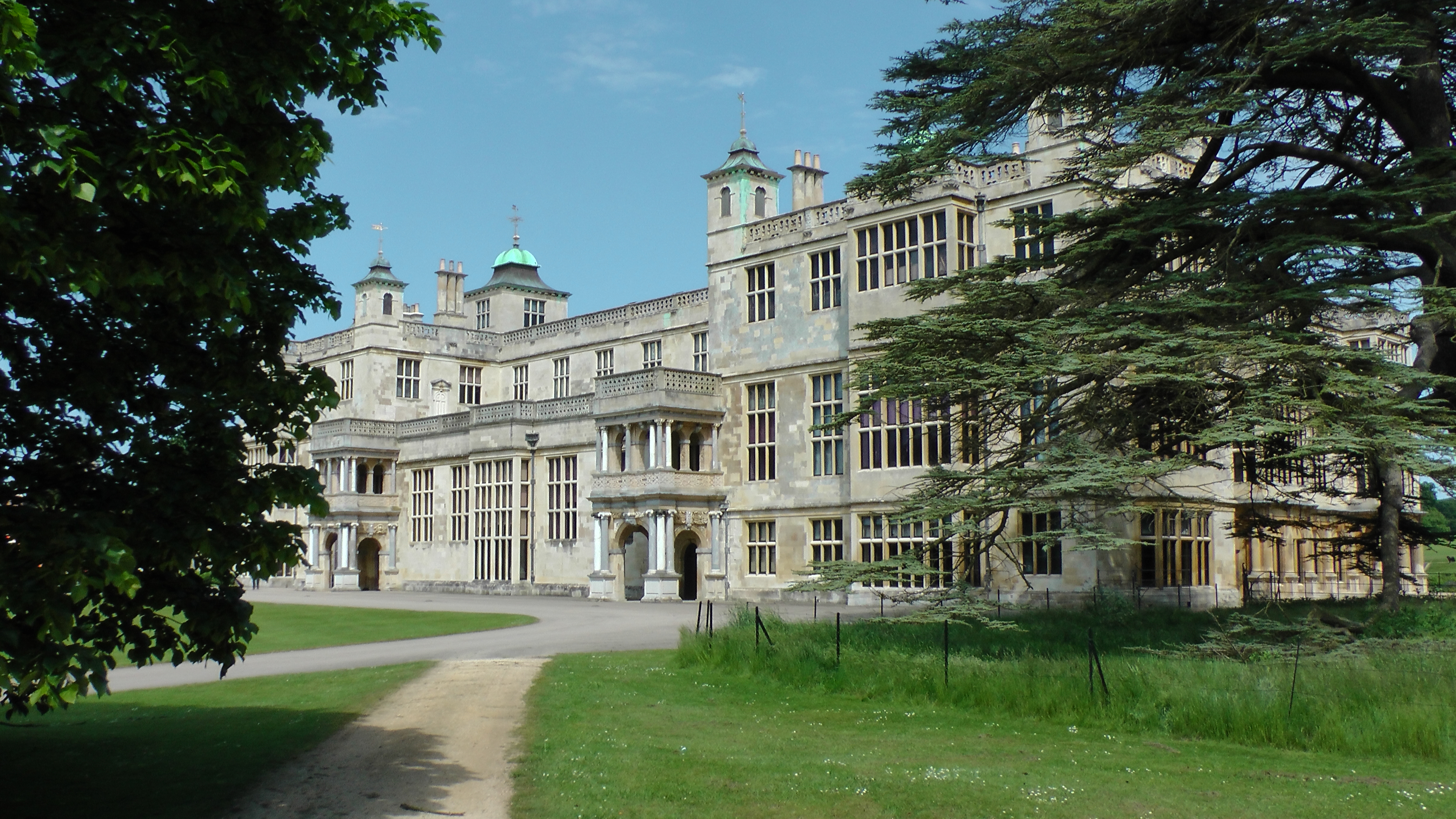

- Location within Essex
- 52°01′15″N 00°13′14″E
- Type: County house
- Location: Saffron Walden, Essex
- OS grid reference: TL524381

History
- Built: 17th century

Site notes
- Architectural style: Jacobean
- Owner: English Heritage

Listed Building – Grade I
- Official name: Audley End House
- Designated: 1 November 1972
- Reference no.: 1196114

National Register of Historic Parks and Gardens
- Official name: Audley End
- Designated: 1 July 1987
- Reference no.: 1000312

Audley End House, or Audley End, is an early 17th-century English country house near to Saffron Walden in north-west Essex. The Jacobean house was built by Thomas Howard, 1st Earl of Suffolk, on the site of a Benedictine monastery that had been awarded to his grandfather, chancellor Thomas Audley, during the dissolution of the monasteries. Suffolk demolished his grandfather's Tudor mansion and built a house of palatial proportions in which he entertained King James I. The house was bought by King Charles II in 1666, but returned to the earls of Suffolk in 1701. Originally consisting of two courts, much of the house was demolished in the 18th century, leaving it about one-third of its original size. The house came into the possession of the Barons Braybrooke at the end of the 18th century and remained with the family for 150 years.

During World War II, the house was used as a base for training Polish SOE agents. After the war, the ninth Lord Braybrooke sold the house and park to the government, although he retained the farms which formed part of the estate. The Ministry of Works opened the house to the public and it is now managed by English Heritage. Rooms on view to visitors include the great hall, chapel, library, reception rooms, nursery and service block. The house contains an extensive collection of pictures on loan from the Braybrooke family.

The park, which was landscaped by Capability Brown in the 18th century, includes a temple, a parterre garden, an organic kitchen garden and a Tudor stable block.

== History ==
=== 16th century ===
Audley End House was built on the site of Walden Abbey, a Benedictine monastery outside Saffron Walden in north-west Essex. The abbey and its lands were granted by Henry VIII to his chancellor Sir Thomas Audley in 1538, during the dissolution of the monasteries. Audley built a manor house on the site, converting the nave of the abbey church into a three-storied residence and part of the abbot's lodging into a great hall. The rest of the church and other buildings were demolished.

After the deaths of Audley and his wife Elizabeth Grey, Audley End was inherited by their only daughter, Margaret, who married Thomas Howard, 4th Duke of Norfolk. Margaret died aged 24 in 1564 and her husband was executed in 1572. The duke's brother Henry Howard became guardian of the orphaned children and took up residence at Audley End. Elizabeth I visited Audley End on two occasions. The first was in September 1569, while the Duke of Norfolk was imprisoned. The second was during the summer progress of 1578, when the court received a delegation from the University of Cambridge.

=== 17th century ===
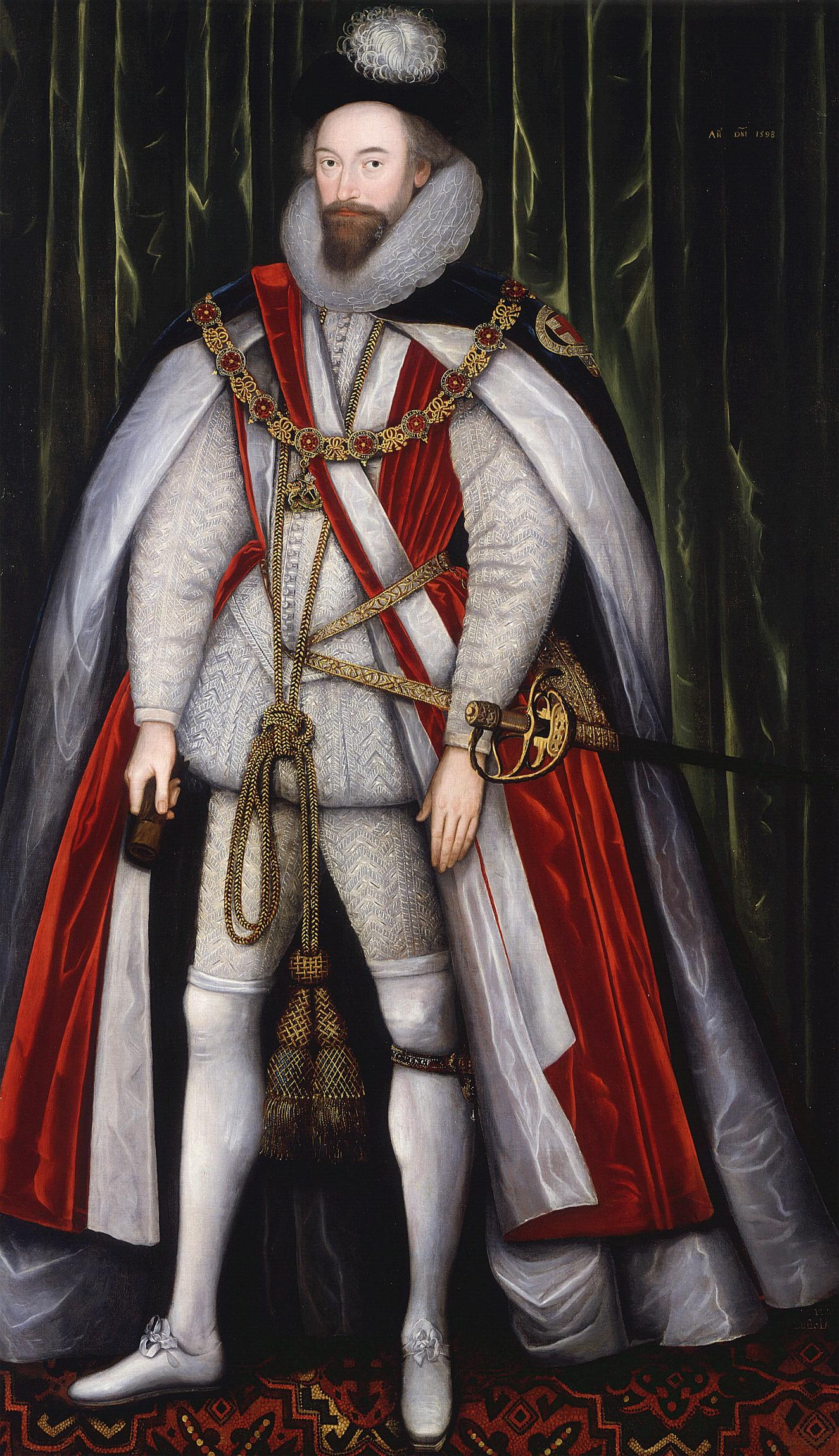
Thomas Howard, 1st Earl of Suffolk, depicted in 1598

In 1603, naval hero Sir Thomas Howard, the eldest son of Margaret Audley and the Duke of Norfolk, pledged allegiance to the new king, James I, was created the Earl of Suffolk and appointed as Lord Chamberlain. He demolished his grandfather's house at Audley End and replaced it with a much grander building that reflected his status and was large enough to accommodate the court on royal visits. The house consisted of an inner and an outer courtyard. The inner courtyard, which was, like the Tudor mansion, built on the site of the abbey cloisters, contained a suite of rooms for the queen in the north range, a suite of rooms for the king in the south range, a great hall on the west front, and a long gallery on the east side. The layout of the quarters for the king and queen each contained a procession of rooms: presence chamber, privy chamber, drawing room, bedchamber and closet. The outer court contained further lodgings. The earl's uncle (who had been created the earl of Northampton), master mason Bernard Janssen and surveyor John Thorpe are thought to have been involved in the design of the house.

It is reputed that the Earl of Suffolk told King James he had spent some £200,000 on building and furnishing the house, though this may have been an exaggeration. The house was completed in 1614, the year that Suffolk was appointed Lord High Treasurer. The king visited in January and July 1614, and remarked that the house was too great for a king but might suit a lord treasurer. The cost of the house and extravagant lifestyle of Suffolk and his wife Katherine Knyvett led to debts and, in 1619, Suffolk was found guilty of embezzlement. He and his wife spent nine days in the Tower of London before a fine secured their release. The earl died at Audley End in 1626.

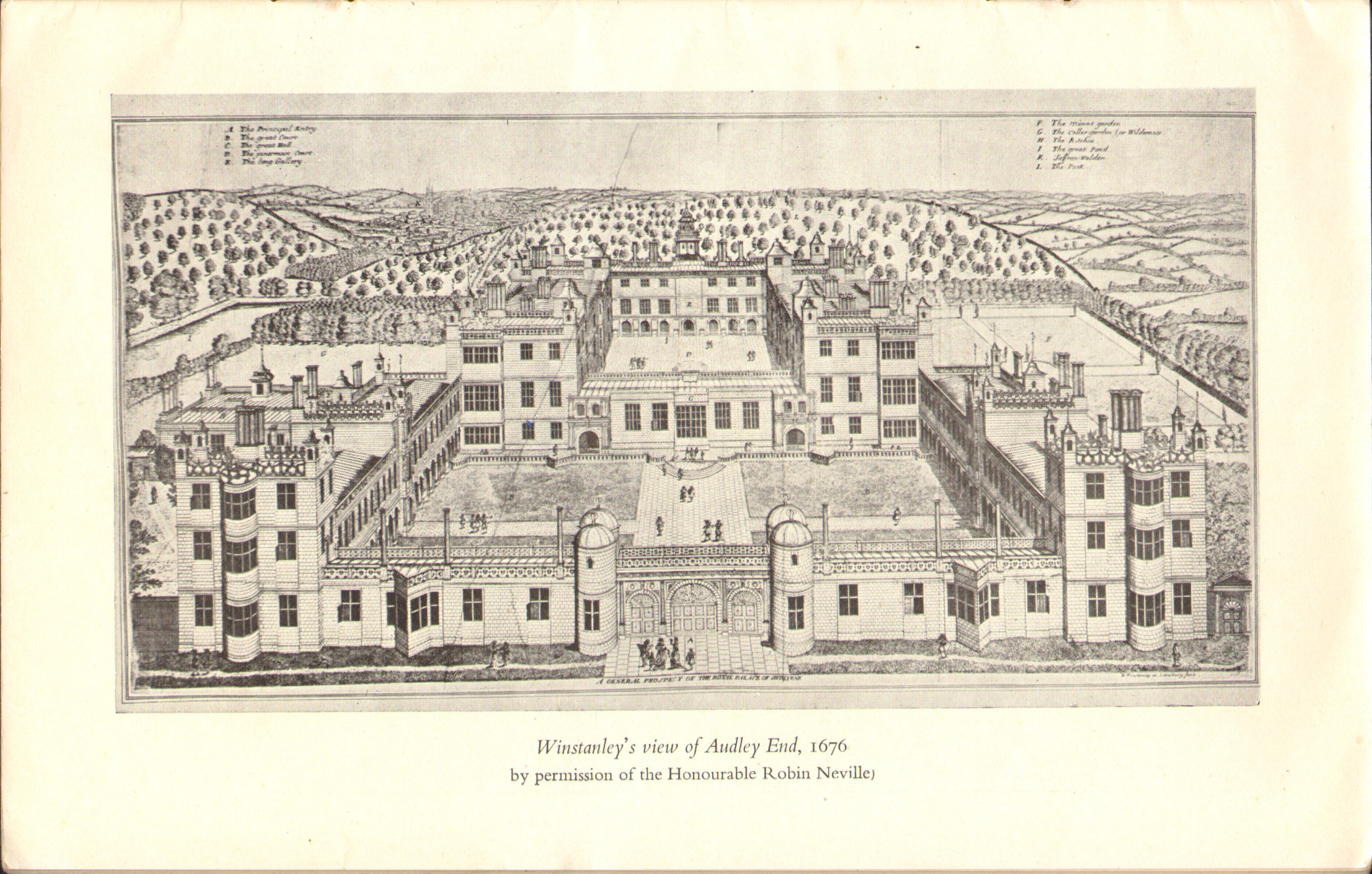
Audley End House in 1676

Along with Audley End, the second and third earls of Suffolk inherited debts, which left them unable to keep the house in good repair. Samuel Pepys visited the house in October 1660 and described it as "very fine", although he was less impressed with the furnishings and paintings. In 1666, the third earl sold Audley End to King Charles II for £50,000, but continued to live in the house as "keeper of the palace". The attraction to the king was that the house was only twenty miles from Newmarket, the centre for his sporting activities. After building Newmarket Palace, he lost interest in Audley End.

Henry Winstanley, who was clerk of the works at Audley End in the 1670s, made a series of engravings that show the extent of the house before it underwent partial demolition in the next century.

=== 18th century ===
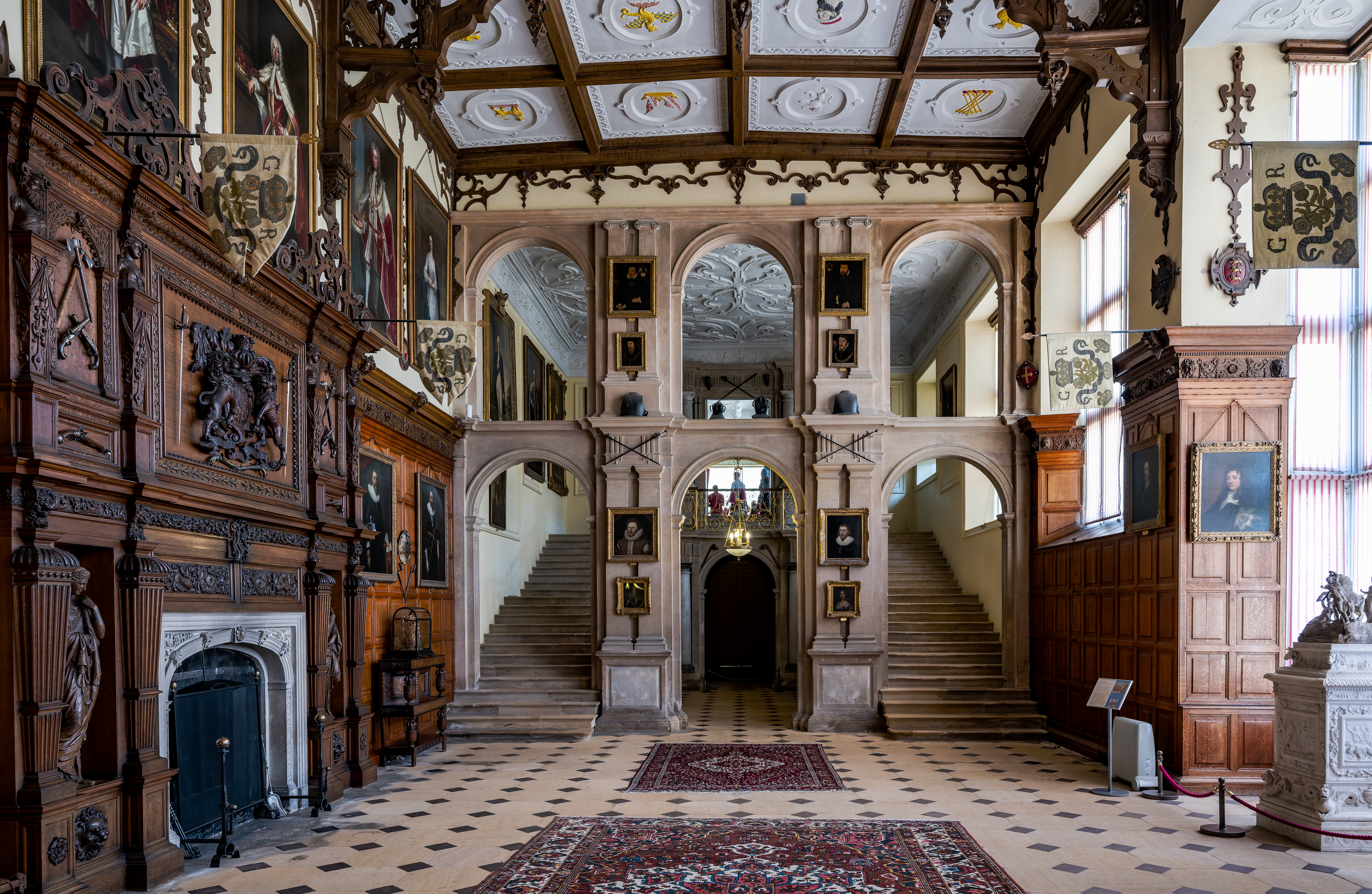
The great hall

Having been in possession of the crown since 1666, Audley End was returned to the Howard family by William III in 1701. The sixth earl of Suffolk commissioned Sir John Vanbrugh to work on the site. Improvements included a new staircase screen in the great hall, while the north and south wings of the outer court were demolished. The ninth earl of Suffolk was responsible for the demolition of the west range of the outer court.

When the tenth earl of Suffolk died intestate in 1745, the title devolved to the fourth earl of Berkshire, while a distant kinsman, the second earl of Effingham, claimed the Audley End estate. His claim was successfully challenged in the Court of Chancery by three descendants of the daughters of the third earl of Suffolk, although one of them, the countess of Portsmouth, had to pay Effingham £10,000 for the house and park. The house was in a dilapidated state when the countess took possession of it, and she proceeded to carry out a programme of demolition and restoration on the advice of the London builders John Phillips and George Shakespear. The long gallery on the east side of the court was demolished to leave the house in its present U-shaped form. When the countess died in 1762, she left Audley End to her sister's son, Sir John Griffin Griffin, fourth Baron Howard de Walden and first Baron Braybrooke.

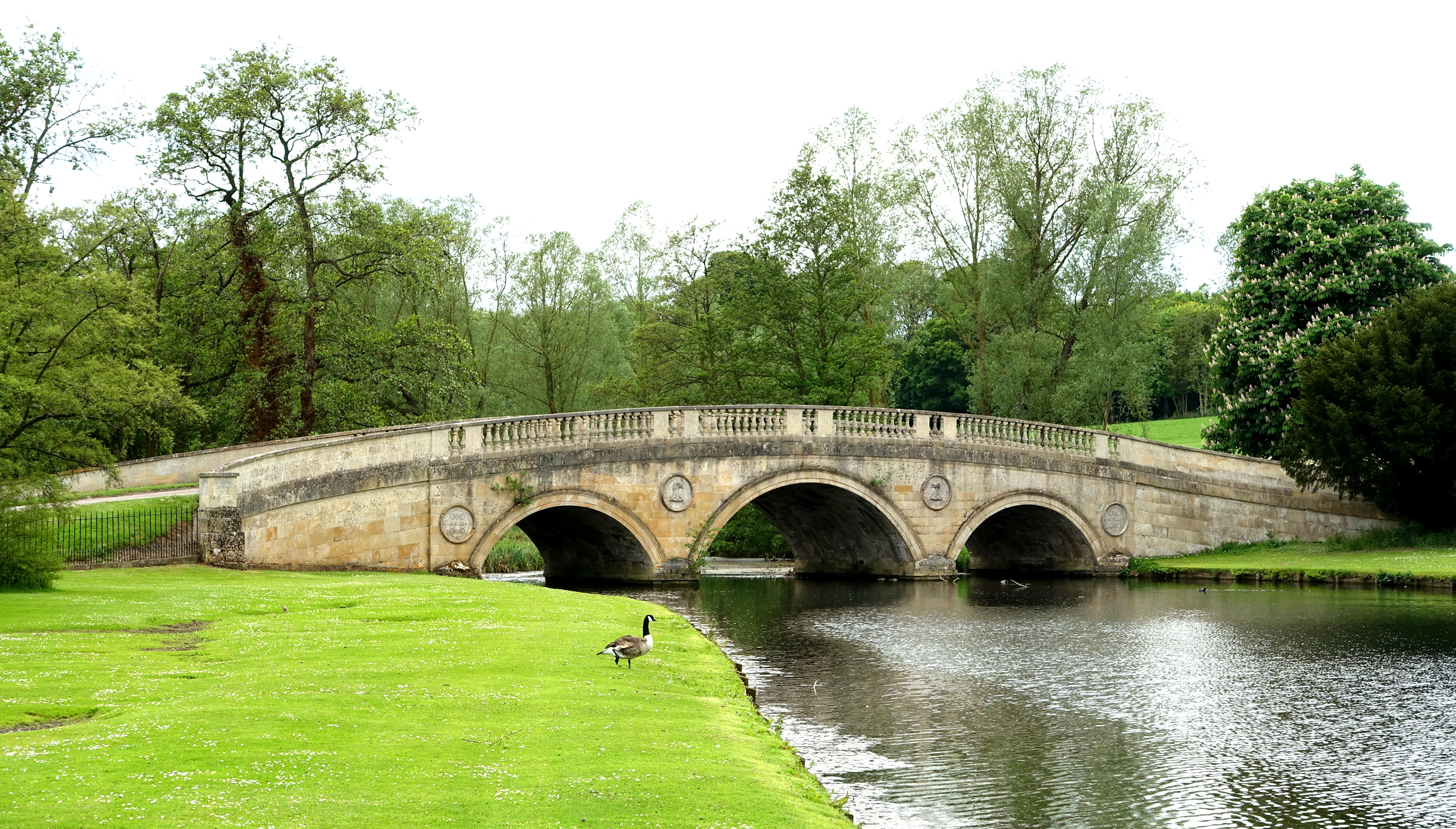
The Adam bridge over the River Cam at Audley End

Griffin spent some thirty years and £100,000 on alterations to Audley End House and its grounds, employing architect Robert Adam and landscape gardener Capability Brown. Adam was responsible for a suite of neoclassical rooms for entertaining in the south wing, a new service block to the north of the house, and a new library that was later demolished. The carpenter, John Hobcraft, designed a new chapel in Gothic style. After Griffin's elevation to the peerage as fourth Baron Howard de Walden in 1784, a new state apartment was created in the south wing in anticipation of a visit from King George III that did not materialise. Capability Brown replaced the old formal gardens with sweeping lawns, widened the River Cam to the west of the house and built a ha-ha to the east. Robert Adam designed a Grecian temple to the west of the house to commemorate the ending of the Seven Years' War in 1763, a bridge over the river on the Walden Road, and a bridge and teahouse over the river to the north-west. The Temple of Concord, surrounded by a ha-ha, was built on the hill to the east of the house in 1792 to commemorate George III's recovery from illness in 1789. Griffin erected an obeslisk in memory to his aunt, Lady Portsmouth, to the north of the house. By the 1790s, fifty gardeners were employed at Audley End to maintain the seven-acre kitchen garden and keep the lawns mown.

Griffin married twice but had no children. On his death in 1797, in accordance with the terms of his aunt's will, he left Audley End House and estate to his third cousin Richard Aldworth Neville, who took the name of Griffin and, by special remainder, the title of second Baron Braybrooke. Although not a blood relative of the Howard family, the second Baron Braybrooke married Catherine Grenville, a descendant of the first earl of Suffolk, and through her the house would stay in the ownership of the descendants of its original builder for another 150 years.

=== 19th century ===
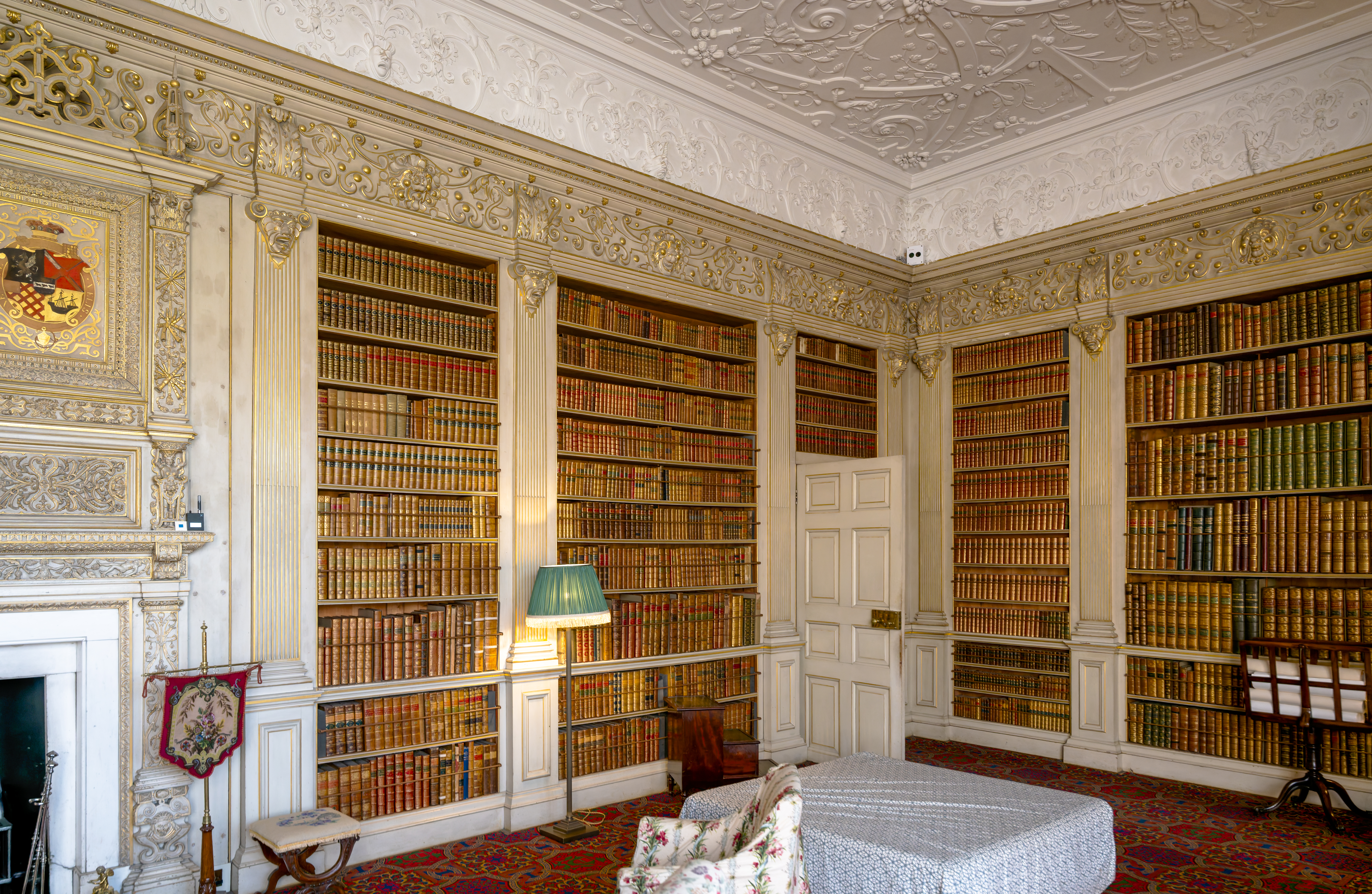
The library

The second Lord Braybrooke spent little time at Audley End, preferring the Neville family seat of Billingbear House in Berkshire. His son, Richard Griffin, 3rd Baron Braybrooke, who inherited the house and title in 1825, made Audley End house his principal home and carried out extensive work in an attempt to restore its Jacobean character. In the south wing, the principal rooms were re-established on the first floor and Robert Adams' state rooms on the ground floor, including the library, converted into bedrooms. A new library was created on the first floor. He brought a collection of furniture and pictures from Billingbear to Audley End, to which was added another collection inherited by his wife Jane, daughter of Charles Cornwallis, 2nd Marquess Cornwallis. The rooms at Audley End remain much as the third Lord Braybrooke left them, although there was a partial restoration of Adam's state rooms in the 1960s. The nursery, which was home to the Braybrookes' eight children, was restored in 2014. Three of the children, Richard, Charles and Latimer became the fourth, fifth and sixth Lords Braybrooke. The third Lord Braybrooke published a history of Audley End, while his son Richard, fourth Lord Braybrooke, was responsible for the natural history collection on display in the house.

=== 20th century ===
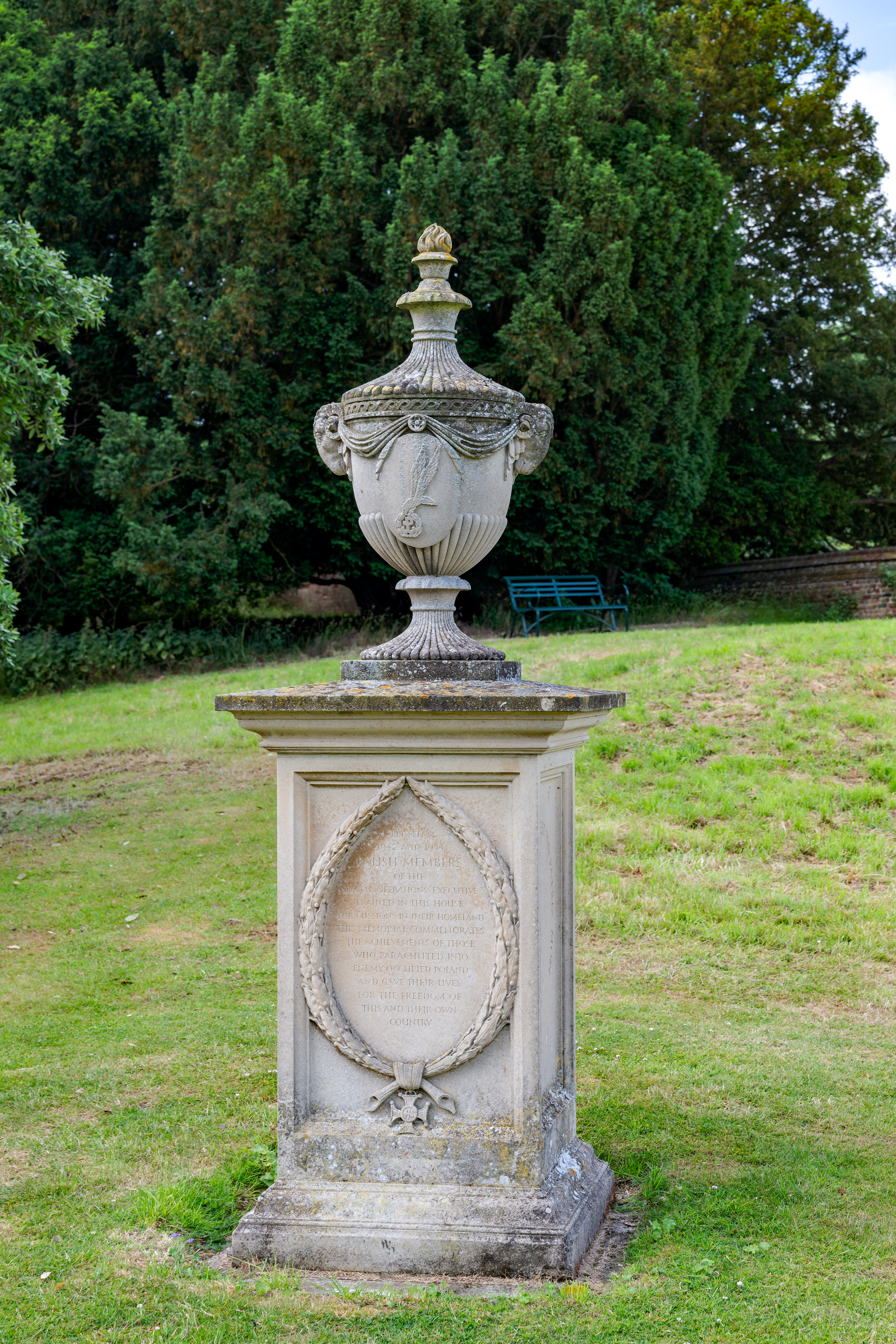
The Polish war memorial

The seventh Lord Braybrooke inherited Audley End in 1904 and for ten years leased it to a kinsman, Lord Howard de Walden, before returning to raise a family after a late second marriage. The house was offered to the government during the Dunkirk evacuation but the offer was declined due to its lack of facilities. Lord Braybrooke died in March 1941 and within weeks the house was requisitioned and used as a camp by a small number of units before being turned over to the Special Operations Executive (SOE). In 1942, the house, designated Special Training School 43 (STS 43), became a base for the training of Polish SOE agents or Cichociemni, operating under the Polish leadership of Lieutenant Colonel Józef Hartman. A war memorial to the 108 Poles who died in the service stands in the main drive. Unveiled on 20 June 1983, the memorial was Grade II listed in 2018.

The eighth Lord Braybrooke and his younger brother were killed in action in World War II and, in 1943, their cousin became the ninth Lord. Faced with double death duties, the ninth Lord Braybrooke offered the house to the National Trust. In 1948 the house was sold to the Ministry of Works, the predecessor of English Heritage, for £30,000. The Braybrooke family retained ownership of the contents of the house and also of the farmland and woodland estate surrounding the house and park.

== Gardens and grounds ==
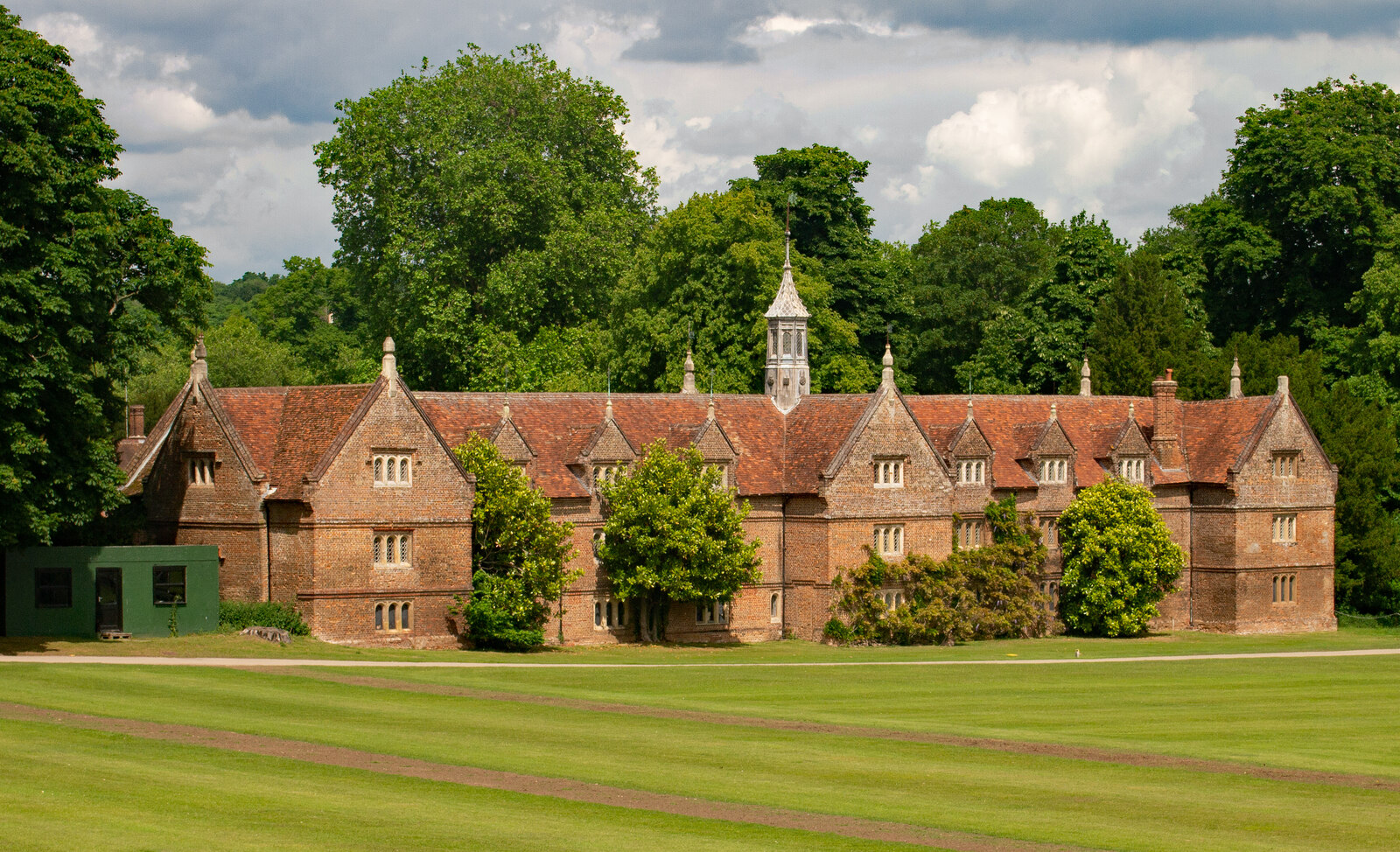
The stable block

The grounds of Audley End House remain largely as Capability Brown designed them in the 18th century. A parterre garden was created to the east of the house in 1832 and has since been restored. The Grade I listed stable block, dating from the late sixteenth century, is situated adjacent to the London Road to the west of the River Cam.

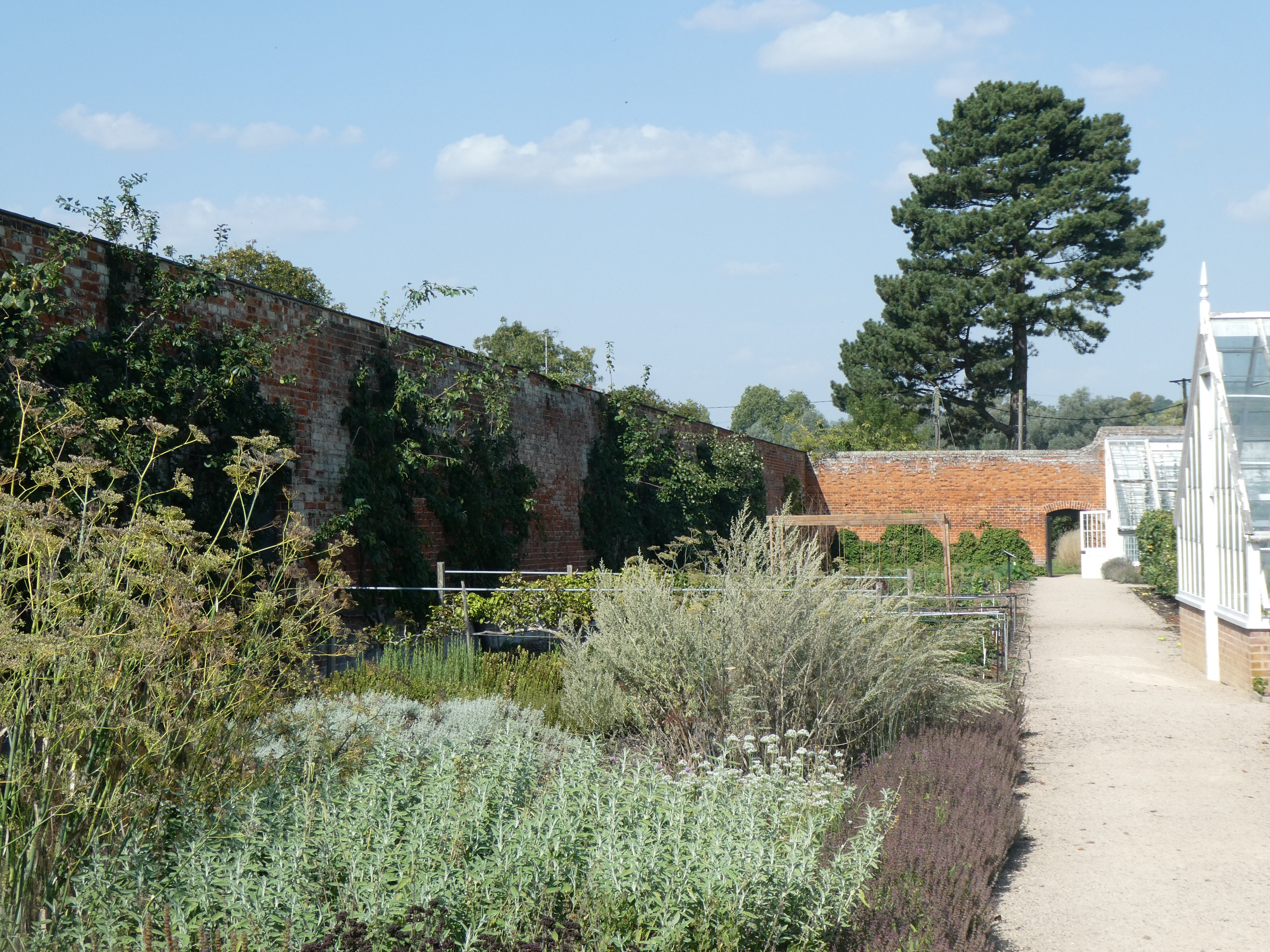
The kitchen garden

With help from an 1877 garden plan and the 1874 journal of gardener William Cresswell, the walled kitchen garden was restored by Garden Organic in 1999 from an overgrown, semi-derelict state. Completed in 2000, it was opened by the then Prince Charles and features in a book presented to him upon his wedding to Camilla Parker Bowles. It now looks as it would have done in late Victorian times: it contains plots for vegetables, fruit, herbs and flowers, which at times have supplied the Dorchester Hotel. The garden contains extensive varietals of multiple plant types: including some 120 apple, 60 pear, and 40 tomato varieties.

== Paintings ==
The house contains a number of paintings, many still the property of the family of the Barons Braybrooke.

== Media appearances ==
The house and grounds have been used in popular television and radio shows, including Flog It!, Antiques Roadshow and Gardeners' Question Time.

The exteriors and gardens were also used for the 1964 feature film Woman of Straw starring Gina Lollobrigida and Sean Connery.

During 2017, scenes were filmed at Audley End for Trust produced by Danny Boyle and based on the life of John Paul Getty III. On 7 September 2018, scenes were shot for The Crown. Previously, interior shots of the Library and Great Hall had been used to portray rooms in Balmoral Castle, Windsor Castle and Eton College.

Audley End appears in The Victorian Way, a series of videos on English Heritage's YouTube channel. The videos, shot at Audley End, feature the character of Mrs Crocombe (based on Avis Crocombe, head cook at the house during the 1880s) demonstrating Victorian cuisine and other aspects of household management in an English country house in the late 19th century.

== Gallery ==
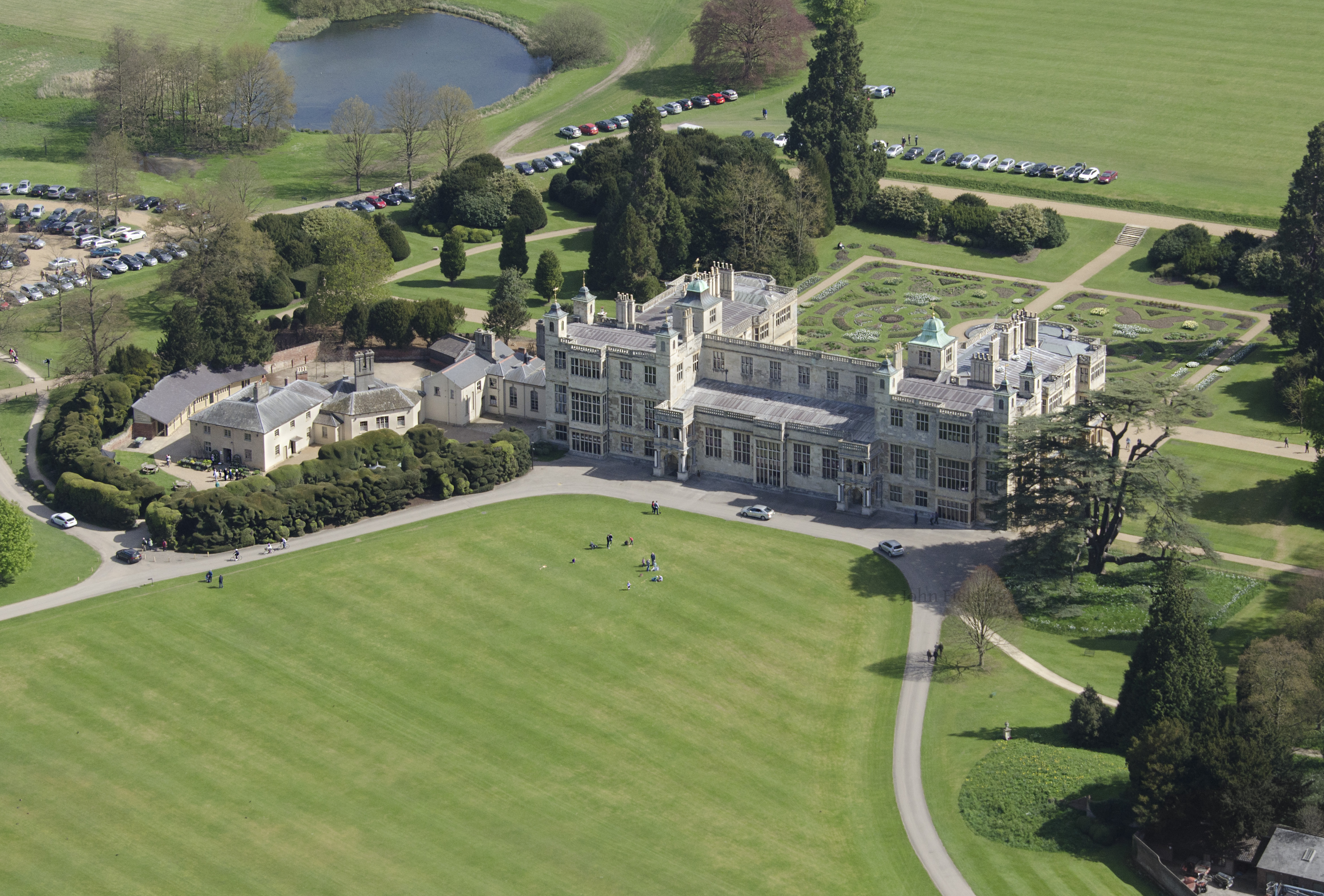
Aerial view from the west

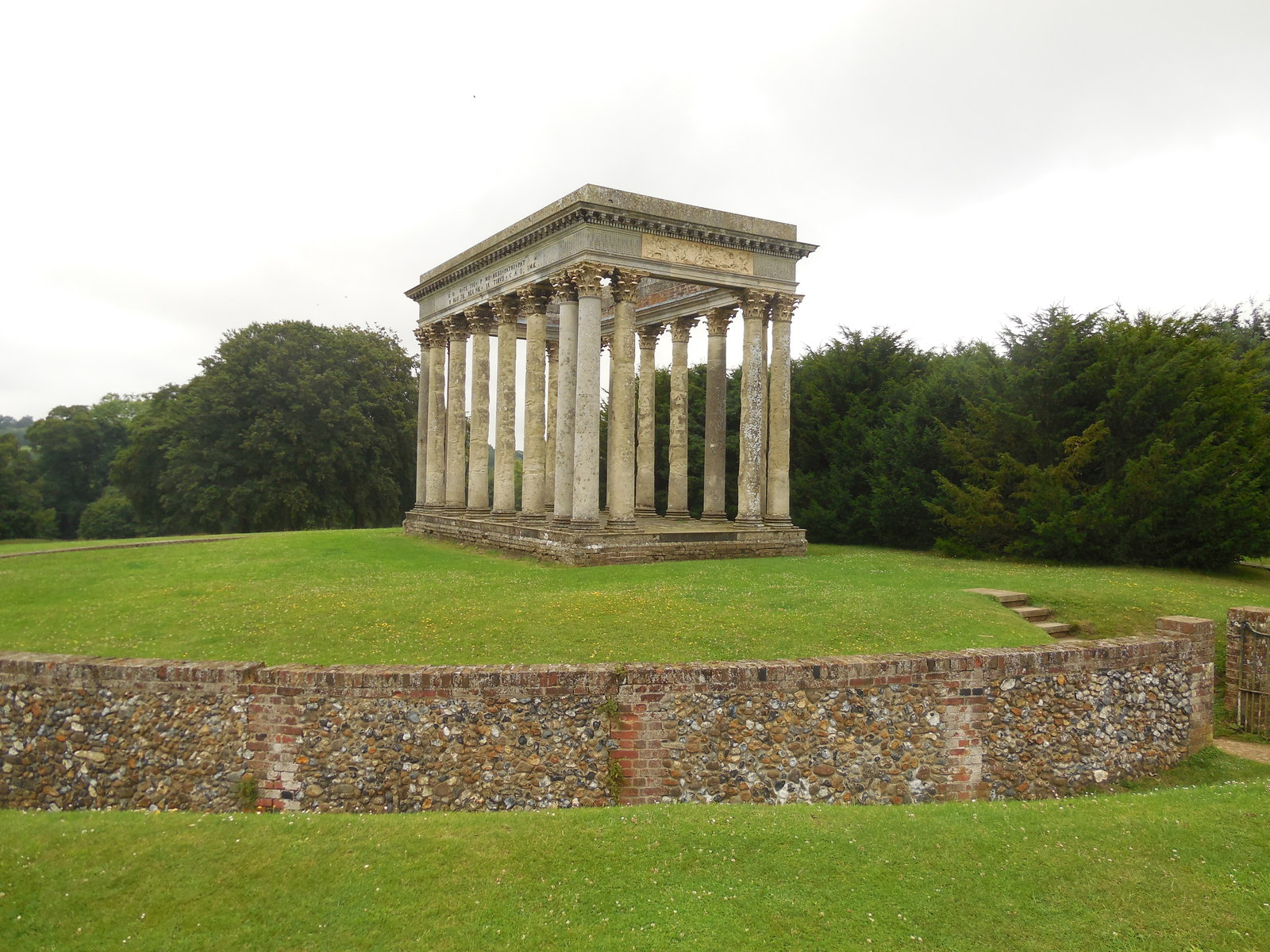
The Temple of Concorde

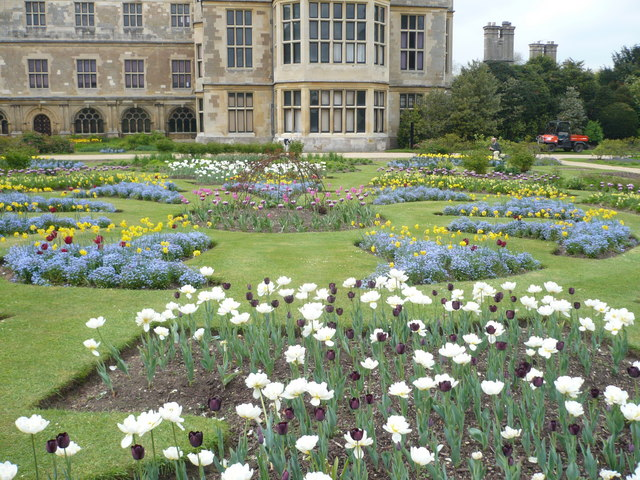
The parterre garden

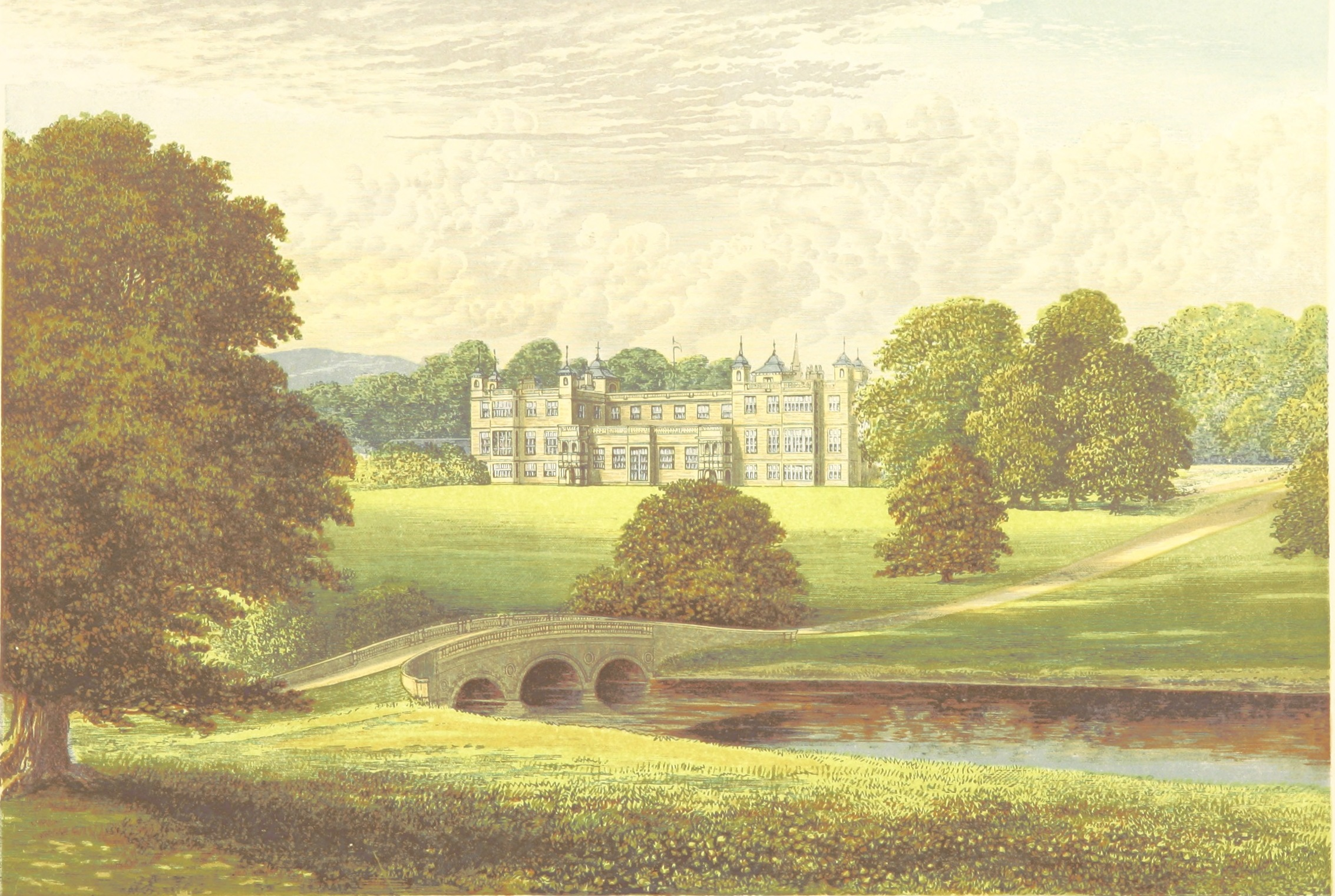
Audley End in 1880

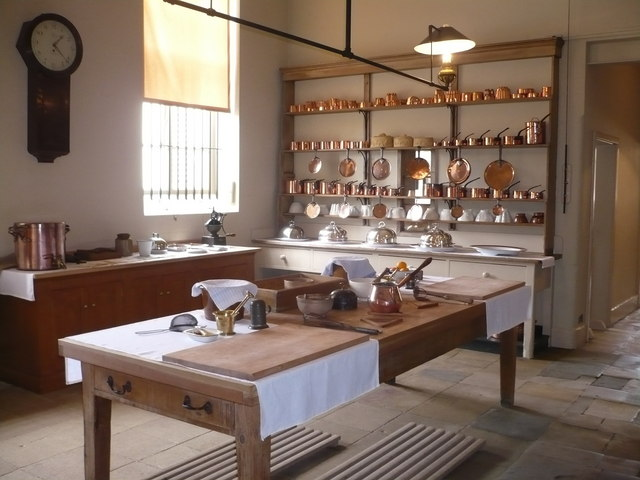
The kitchen

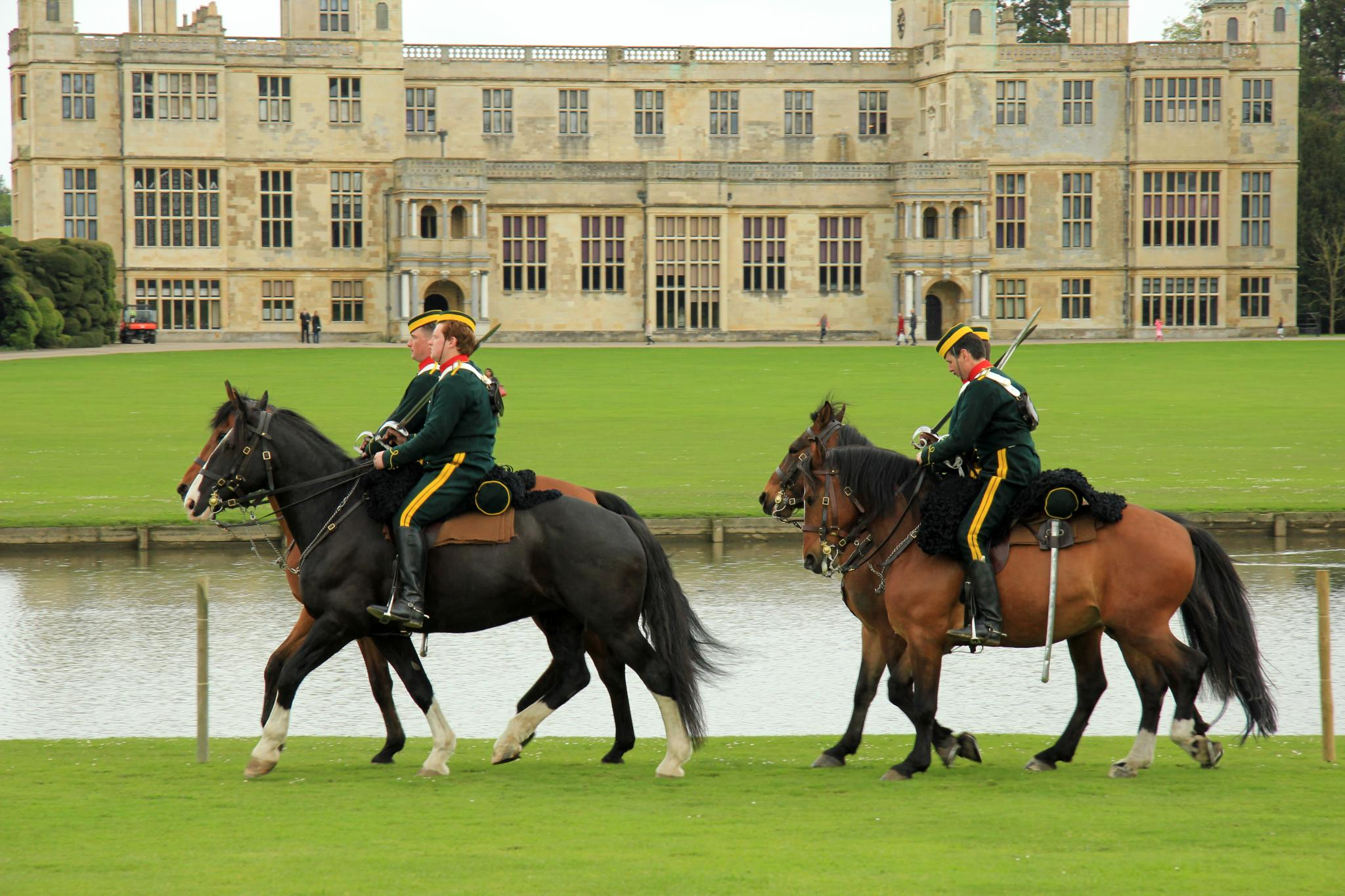
A riding display

== See also ==
- Audley End Railway, miniature railway in the grounds
- Audley End railway station
