= Audley End Railway =

Miniature railway in Essex, England

Audley End Enchanted Railway
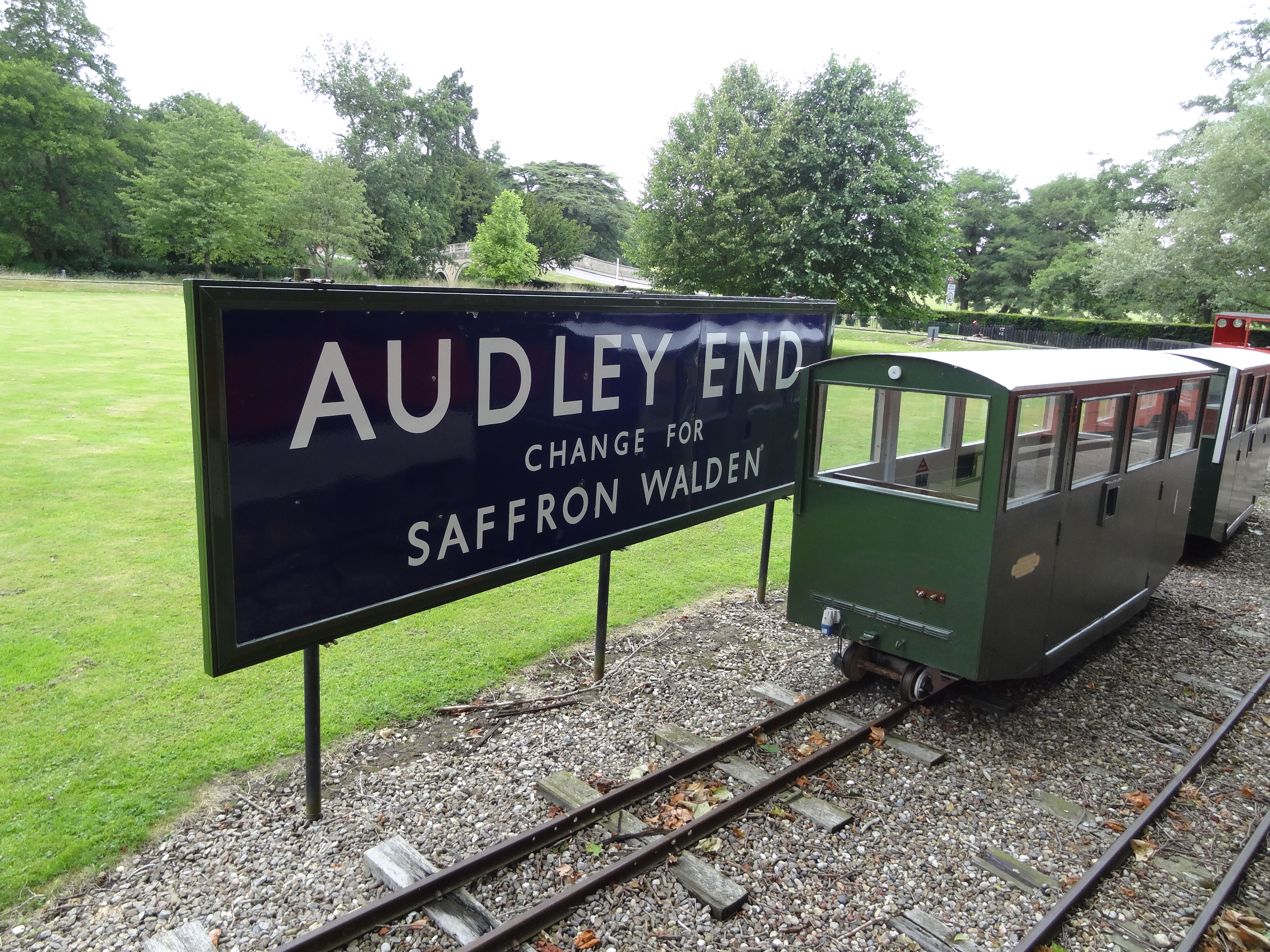
- Rolling stock and old station sign
- Locale: Saffron Walden, Essex
- Terminus: Audley End
- Coordinates: 52.0193°N 0.2176°E

Commercial operations
- Name: Audley End Enchanted Railway
- Built by: Lord Braybrooke
- Original gauge: 10 1/4 in (260 mm)

Preserved operations
- Stations: 1
- Length: 1 1/2 miles (2.4 km)
- Preserved gauge: 10 1/4 in (260 mm)

Commercial history
- Opened: 1964

Preservation history
- 1963: Building commences
- 1964: Line opens
- 1979: Line extended to its present length.
- 2010: Amanda Murray took over the railway from her father.
- 2012: The Fairy Walk opened.
- 2023: New welcome centre and shop opened.
- 2024: Celebrated 60 years.

Website
- Audley End Railway

Audley End Enchanted Railway (trading name for Audley End Miniature Railway Ltd. as of February 2026) is a woodland family attraction park and railway established in 1964 and located near Saffron Walden in Essex, England. Set opposite Audley End House and inside Audley End parkland designed by Capability Brown, the railway operates through ancient woodland alongside the River Cam and attracts more than 145,000 visitors annually.

== Overview ==
The railway runs along a 1 1/2-mile (2.4 km) custom-built track, built by the late Lord Braybrooke, through the Fulfen Forest, a private woodland with shaded glades, clearings and river crossings. A bridge over the River Cam and a tunnel are among the route's engineering features.

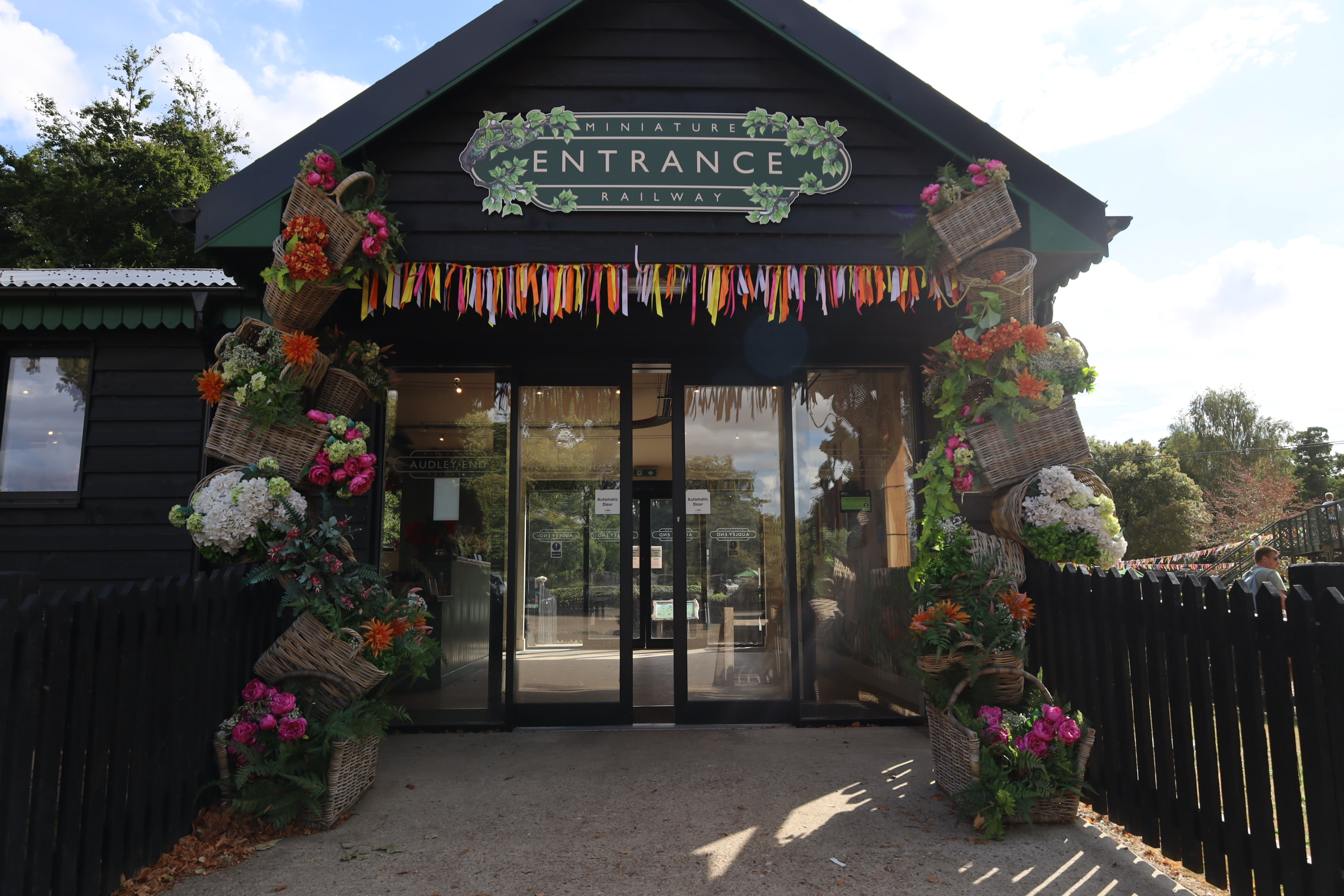
Audley End Enchanted Railway Entrance

The station area includes a ticket office & shop, Station Snack café and restroom facilities.

The attraction also hosts educational and recreational school visits and a regular forest school programme during the summer term.

Audley End Miniature Railway runs a year-round calendar of themed events, during which the entire site is redecorated to match the season with custom displays throughout the forest, multiple curated shows with the train ride and an array of seasonal activities. The main themed events include Easter Special, Summer Festival, and Halloween Special; Christmas is the most well-known event with over 50,000 visitors annually.

The site also hosts licensed character events during May half term.

During summer, visitors can also take punting trips on the River Cam. Additional evening programming, including “Rivernights” adult events has been developed in 2026.

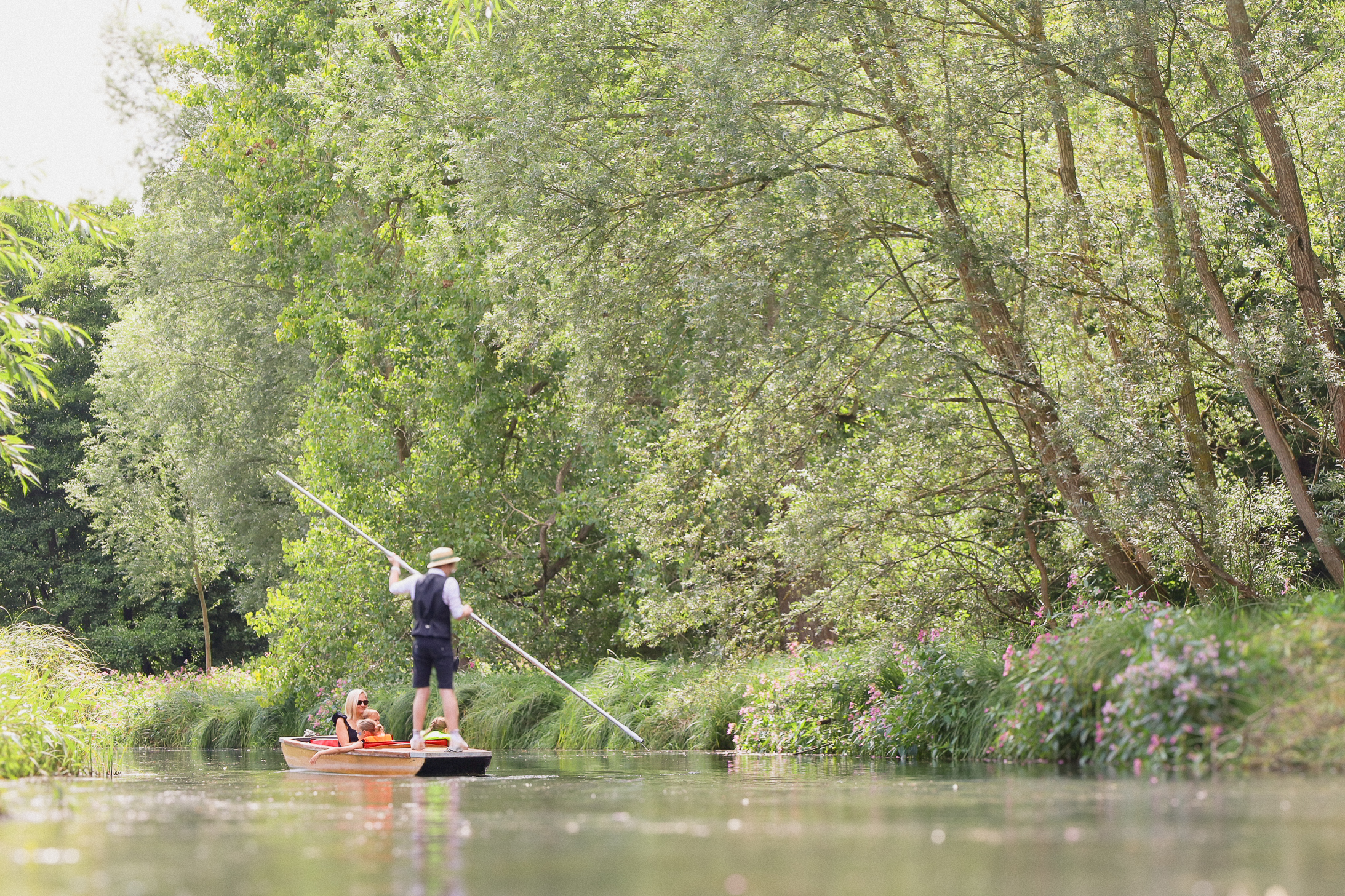
Audley End Enchanted Railway Punting

== Sustainability ==
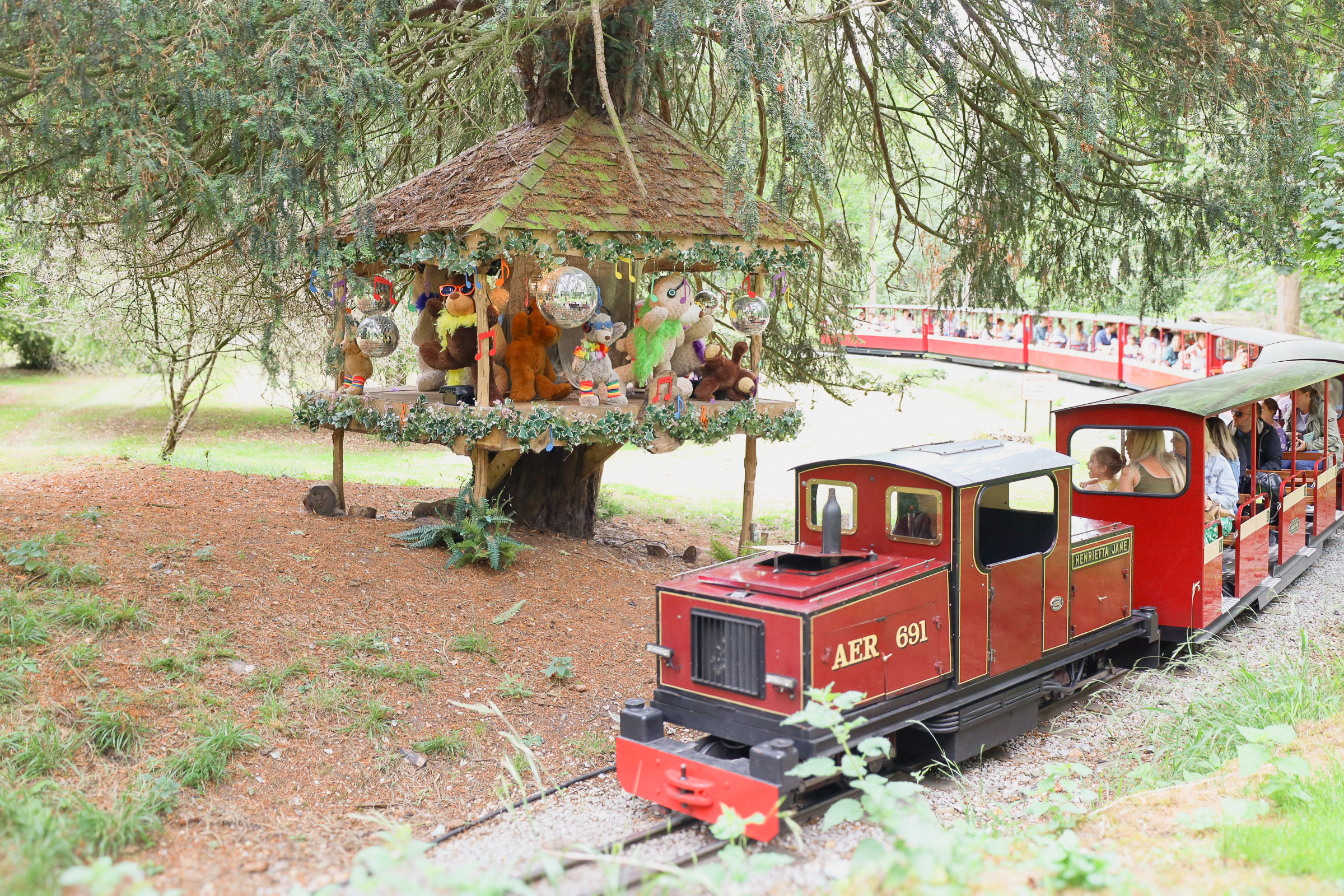
Audley End Enchanted Railway Summer Festival Train

In 2024, the site introduced its first custom-built all-electric locomotive, Electra, as part of its long-term sustainability strategy. The railway continues to maintain a mixed fleet of steam, diesel and electric locomotives.

== History ==
The miniature railway was built by Lord Braybrooke, who had a lifelong interest in steam trains. The site itself officially opened to the public on 16 May 1964, with racing driver Sir Stirling Moss performing the opening ceremony. Originally a 10 1/4 inches (260 mm) gauge railway woodland loop with teddy bears and picnic areas, it has since grown into one of the most popular family attractions in Essex.

The line has two tunnels and crosses the River Cam and River Fulfen. The bridge across the Cam retains the original World War II pillbox.

Since 2011, the site has been run by Lord Braybrooke's daughter, Amanda Murray, who has overseen its development into a modern visitor destination with immersive events and expanded infrastructure.

== Visitor numbers and significance ==
The attraction draws over 145,000 visitors each year, with peak daily visitor numbers exceeding 2,000. It is considered one of the leading miniature railways and children attractions in the UK and plays a significant role in family tourism in the East of England. It is located just outside the town of Saffron Walden. In September 2026, The Times published a feature on Audley End Enchanted Railway, documenting its history as a family-run attraction and the introduction of its new battery-electric locomotive, designed to replicate the appearance and sounds of a traditional steam engine https://www.thetimes.com/life-style/property-home/article/we-built-a-railway-in-our-stately-home-garden-dx6z80frc
