= James Grenville, 1st Baron Glastonbury =

British politician (1742–1825)

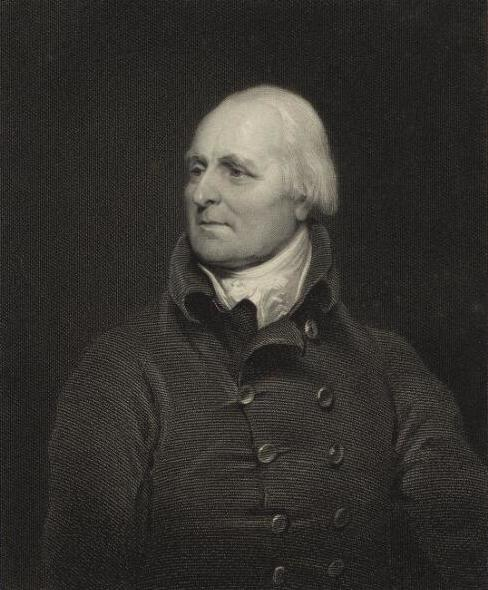
Portrait of James Grenville c.1810

James Grenville, 1st Baron Glastonbury, PC (6 July 1742 – 26 April 1825) of Butleigh Court, Somerset was a United Kingdom politician, who was a member of both houses of Parliament during his career.

== Background ==
Grenville was the eldest son of James Grenville MP (12 February 1715 – 14 September 1783) and a first cousin of George Nugent-Temple-Grenville, 1st Marquess of Buckingham. He was educated at Eton College and Christ Church, Oxford.

The Grenvilles were the most prominent aristocratic family in the south-eastern English county of Buckinghamshire in the 18th and early 19th centuries. For much of this time they supplied one of the two parliamentary representatives of Buckinghamshire and both of those from the town of Buckingham. The family produced some prominent national political figures, including two Prime Ministers (George Grenville and William Wyndham Grenville, 1st Baron Grenville). They were also related to William Pitt the Elder and William Pitt the Younger.

== Career ==
Grenville served as Member of Parliament for the Yorkshire borough of Thirsk 1766–1768. He sat for his family borough of Buckingham 1770–1790, from 1774 to 1780 in partnership with his twin brother, Richard. He then represented the county seat of Buckinghamshire 1790–1797.

He succeeded his father in 1783. As a politician he generally followed his family connection up to 1801 and after 1806, but between those years he continued to support William Pitt the Younger instead of becoming closer to Charles James Fox as most of his politically active Grenville relatives did.

He held junior ministerial office as a Lord of the Treasury March 1782 – March 1783. William Petty, 2nd Earl of Shelburne offered to make Grenville Chancellor of the Exchequer or Secretary at War, but he declined these appointments. He was sworn of the Privy Council on 26 December 1783. He was a member of the Board of Trade from 1784 until his death.

On 20 October 1797 he was created Baron Glastonbury. Lord Glastonbury never married and the title became extinct on his death in 1825. He left his estate to the bibliophile Thomas Grenville, with a remainder, including Butleigh Court, to a relative, the Reverend George Neville of Windsor, later Dean of Windsor, who then added the name of Grenville to his own.

Parliament of Great Britain
Preceded by Sir Thomas Frankland, Bt; Henry Grenville	Member of Parliament for Thirsk; 1765–1768; With: Sir Thomas Frankland, Bt	Succeeded by Sir Thomas Frankland, Bt; William Frankland
Preceded by George Grenville; Henry Grenville	Member of Parliament for Buckingham; 1770–1790; With: Henry Grenville 1770–1774; Richard Grenville 1774–1780; Richard Aldworth-Neville 1780–1782; William Wyndham Grenville 1782–1784; Charles Edmund Nugent 1784–1790; George Nugent 1790	Succeeded by George Nugent; Sir Alexander Hood
Preceded by William Grenville; The Earl Verney	Member of Parliament for Buckinghamshire; 1790–1797; With: The Earl Verney 1790–1791; Marquess of Titchfield 1791–1797	Succeeded by Earl Temple; Marquess of Titchfield
Peerage of Great Britain
New creation	Baron Glastonbury; 1797–1825	Extinct
