= Charles Neville =

Charles Nevill(e) may refer to:

- Charles Neville, 6th Earl of Westmorland (1543–1601), English nobleman and one of the leaders of the Rising of the North in 1569
- Charles Neville (musician) (1938–2018), American saxophonist with The Neville Brothers
- Charles Neville (UDF), see 1981 in the Irish Republican Army
- Charles William Nevill (1815–1888), British Member of Parliament for Carmarthen, 1874–1876
- Charles Neville, 5th Baron Braybrooke (1823–1902), British peer
