= Richard Grenville (British Army officer) =

General Richard Grenville
- Born: 6 July 1742
- Died: 22 April 1823 (aged 80)
- Military career
- Allegiance: Great Britain
- Branch: British Army
- Rank: General
- Other work: Member of Parliament

General Richard Grenville (6 July 1742 – 22 April 1823) was a senior officer in the British Army and a politician who sat in the House of Commons from 1774 to 1780.

== Biography ==
Grenville was the second son of James Grenville and was the twin brother of James Grenville, 1st Baron Glastonbury. He attended Eton College from 1754 to 1758, and in 1759 he entered the Army, as an ensign in the 1st Foot Guards.

Grenville obtained the rank of captain in 1760, by raising an independent company, and on 7 May 1761 he was removed to a company in the 24th Regiment of Foot. He served the campaigns of 1761 and 1762 in Germany, as aide-de-camp to the Marquess of Granby. In 1772 he purchased a company in the Coldstream Guards, and in 1776 he accompanied the brigade of Guards to America. On 19 February 1779 he received the rank of colonel, on 20 November 1782 that of major-general, on 21 April 1786, the colonelcy for life of the 23rd Regiment of Foot, and on 3 May 1796 the rank of lieutenant-general. In 1798 he was appointed commandant of the garrison at Plymouth in the absence of the Governor, and on 1 January 1801 he was promoted to general.

Grenville was returned as Member of Parliament for Buckingham, together with his twin brother James, on the family interest at the 1774 general election. His military activities appear to have prevented him from making much of a contribution in Parliament. Whether by his own choice or at the instigation of Lord Temple, he did not stand in 1780.

Grenville was in charge of Prince Frederick Augustus's establishment in Hanover from about 1781 until 1787, then served as comptroller and master of the Household to him as Duke of York from 1788 until 1823.

Grenville died unmarried in 1823.

Military offices
Preceded by Sir William Howe, 5th Viscount Howe	Colonel of the 23rd Regiment of Foot; 1786–1823	Succeeded by Sir James Willoughby Gordon, Bt
Parliament of Great Britain
Preceded by Henry Grenville; James Grenville	Member of Parliament for Buckingham; 1774–1780; With: James Grenville	Succeeded by Richard Griffin; James Grenville
