= Baron Glastonbury =

Barony in the Peerage of Great Britain

Baron Glastonbury is a title that was created twice in the Peerage of Great Britain. The first creation came on 19 March 1719 (as Baroness Glastonbury), as a life peerage and as a subsidiary title for Ehrengard Melusine von der Schulenburg, Duchess of Kendal and Munster, mistress of George I.

The second creation came on 29 October 1797 when the politician James Grenville was made Baron Glastonbury, of Butleigh in the County of Somerset, with remainder, in default of male issue of his own, to his younger brother General Richard Grenville and the heirs male of his body. A member of the influential Grenville family, he was the eldest son of the Honourable James Grenville, third son of Richard Grenville and Hester Grenville, 1st Countess Temple (see Viscount Cobham for more information on the Grenville family). General Richard Grenville died unmarried in 1823. Lord Glastonbury was also unmarried and the title consequently became extinct on his death in 1825.

== Baroness Glastonbury (1719) ==
- Ehrengard Melusine von der Schulenburg, Duchess of Kendal and Munster (1659–1743)

== Baron Glastonbury (1797) ==
- James Grenville, 1st Baron Glastonbury (1742–1825)

== See also ==
- Viscount Cobham
