= Charles Neville, 5th Baron Braybrooke =

British peer

Charles Cornwallis Neville, 5th Baron Braybrooke (29 August 1823 – 7 June 1902) was a British peer.

== Life ==
Neville was the second son of Richard Griffin Neville, 3rd Baron Braybrooke (1783–1858), by his wife Lady Jane Cornwallis (1798–1856), daughter of the 2nd Marquess Cornwallis. His father was a maternal descendant of the Neville family. He was born in 1823, and was educated at Eton and Magdalene College, Cambridge.

In February 1861 he succeeded his brother as fifth Baron Braybrooke, and inherited the estate of Audley End. He took a great interest in local affairs and was important to the neighbouring town of Saffron Walden and to the county of Essex. Lord Braybrooke was hereditary visitor of Magdalene College, Cambridge, and served as Justice of the peace, Deputy Lieutenant, and Vice-Lieutenant of Essex. He was a captain of the 17th Essex Rifle Volunteers.

He died at Audley End on 7 June 1902.

He married on 9 October 1849 Florence Priscilla Alicia Maude (1825–1914), daughter of Cornwallis Maude, 3rd Viscount Hawarden and sister of the Earl de Montalt. They had an only child, Augusta Neville (1860–1903), who married Richard Strutt (1848–1927), a younger son of the 2nd Baron Rayleigh. The barony was inherited by a younger brother, Latimer Neville (1827–1904).

Peerage of Great Britain
Preceded by Richard Neville	Baron Braybrooke; 1861–1902	Succeeded by Latimer Neville
