= George Neville-Grenville =

English Dean of Windsor (1789–1854)

The Very Reverend and Honourable George Neville-Grenville
- Dean of Windsor
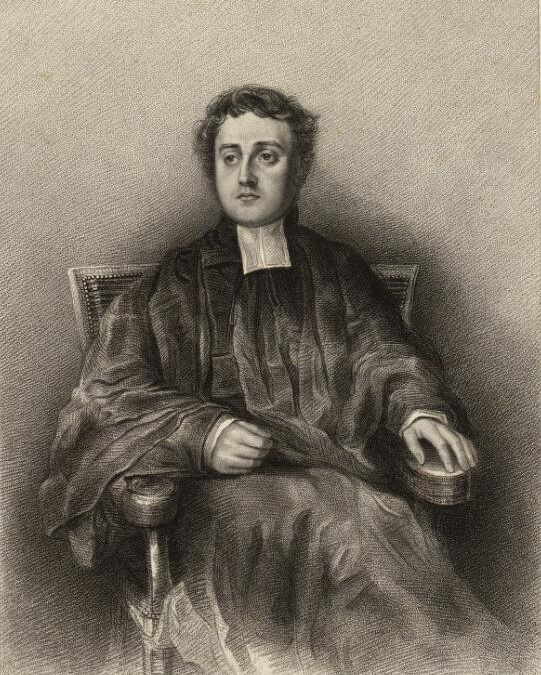
- Church: Church of England
- In office: 1846–1854
- Predecessor: Henry Hobart
- Successor: Gerald Wellesley
- Other post: Chaplain-in-Ordinary

Personal details
- Born: 17 August 1789
- Died: 10 June 1854 (aged 64) Butleigh Court, Somerset
- Parents: Richard Griffin, 2nd Baron Braybrooke; Catherine Grenville
- Spouse: Lady Charlotte Legge (m. 1816)
- Children: 11
- Education: Eton College
- Alma mater: Trinity College, Cambridge

George Neville-Grenville (17 August 1789 – 10 June 1854), named George Neville until 1825, was Dean of Windsor in the mid nineteenth century.

== Early life ==
Neville was born a younger son of the Hon Richard Griffin MP (later 2nd Baron Braybrooke) and the Hon Mrs Griffin (née Catherine Grenville and later Lady Braybrooke, a daughter of prime minister George Grenville); his elder brother was (later) Richard Griffin, 3rd Baron Braybrooke.

He was educated at Eton and Trinity College, Cambridge.

== Career ==
In 1813, he was nominated by his father, as owner of Audley End, as Master of Magdalene College, Cambridge. He served in this role for forty years. An Honorary Chaplain to the Queen, he was also register of the Order of the Garter.

On being appointed Dean of Windsor in 1846, Neville-Grenville offered to resign the mastership of Magdalene, but was blocked by the Visitor, his brother Lord Braybrooke, who had earmarked the post for his fourth son Latimer Neville, then aged 19. The Master's health was in decline: by 1850, although still only sixty years of age, he was "a wreck". With some diplomacy needed to manage the Fellowship, the transition was achieved in 1853, and Latimer Neville became Master at the age of 26.

== Personal life ==
In 1816 he married Lady Charlotte Legge, daughter of George Legge, 3rd Earl of Dartmouth and Lady Frances Finch (second daughter of Heneage Finch, 3rd Earl of Aylesford and Lady Charlotte Seymour, herself the daughter of Charles Seymour, 6th Duke of Somerset). Together, they were the parents of:

- Ralph Neville-Grenville (1817–1886), a Tory MP who married Julia Roberts Frankland-Russell, fourth daughter of Sir Robert Frankland-Russell, 7th Baronet and Louisa Anne Murray (a daughter of Rt. Rev. Lord George Murray, Bishop of St David's) in 1845.
- William Frederick Neville (1818–1882), Vicar of Butleigh and Prebendary of Wells; he married Fanny Grace Blackwood in 1847.
- Frances Catherine Neville, who married the Rev. Edmund Peel, in 1849.
- Georgiana Neville (1821–1882)
- Cicely Neville (1821–1898)
- Seymour Neville (b. 1823), Rector of Ockham; he married Agnes Mary Proby, youngest daughter of Rev. Charles Privy, Canon of Windsor and Vicar of Twickenham, in 1859.
- Edward Neville (b. 1824), a Lt.-Col. who married Georgiana Frances Corbett, daughter of Vincent Corbett, in 1866.
- Harriet Louisa Neville, who married the Rev. Charles Arundell St John-Mildmay, third son of Paulet St John-Mildmay, in 1854.
- Adelaide Neville (d. 1837)
- Capt Glastonbury Neville (1829–1858), who was killed in action at Barodia, near Ratghur.
- William Wyndham Neville (1834–1858)

Neville-Grenville died at his seat, Butleigh Court near Glastonbury, on 10 June 1854.

Academic offices
Preceded by William Gretton	Master of Magdalene College, Cambridge; 1813–1853	Succeeded by Latimer Neville
Church of England titles
Preceded by Henry Hobart	Dean of Windsor; 1846–1854	Succeeded by Gerald Wellesley
