= Baron Braybrooke =

Title in the Peerage of Great Britain

Barony of Braybrooke
- Creation date: 5 September 1788
- Created by: George III
- Peerage: Peerage of Great Britain
- First holder: John Griffin Griffin, 1st Baron Braybrooke
- Present holder: Richard Neville, 11th Baron Braybrooke
- Heir apparent: Hon. Edward Alfred Neville
- Remainder to: 1st baron's heirs male in default to his kinsman Richard Aldworth Neville
- Status: Extant
- Seat: None
- Former seat: Audley End
- Motto: Ne Vile Velis ("Incline to nothing base")

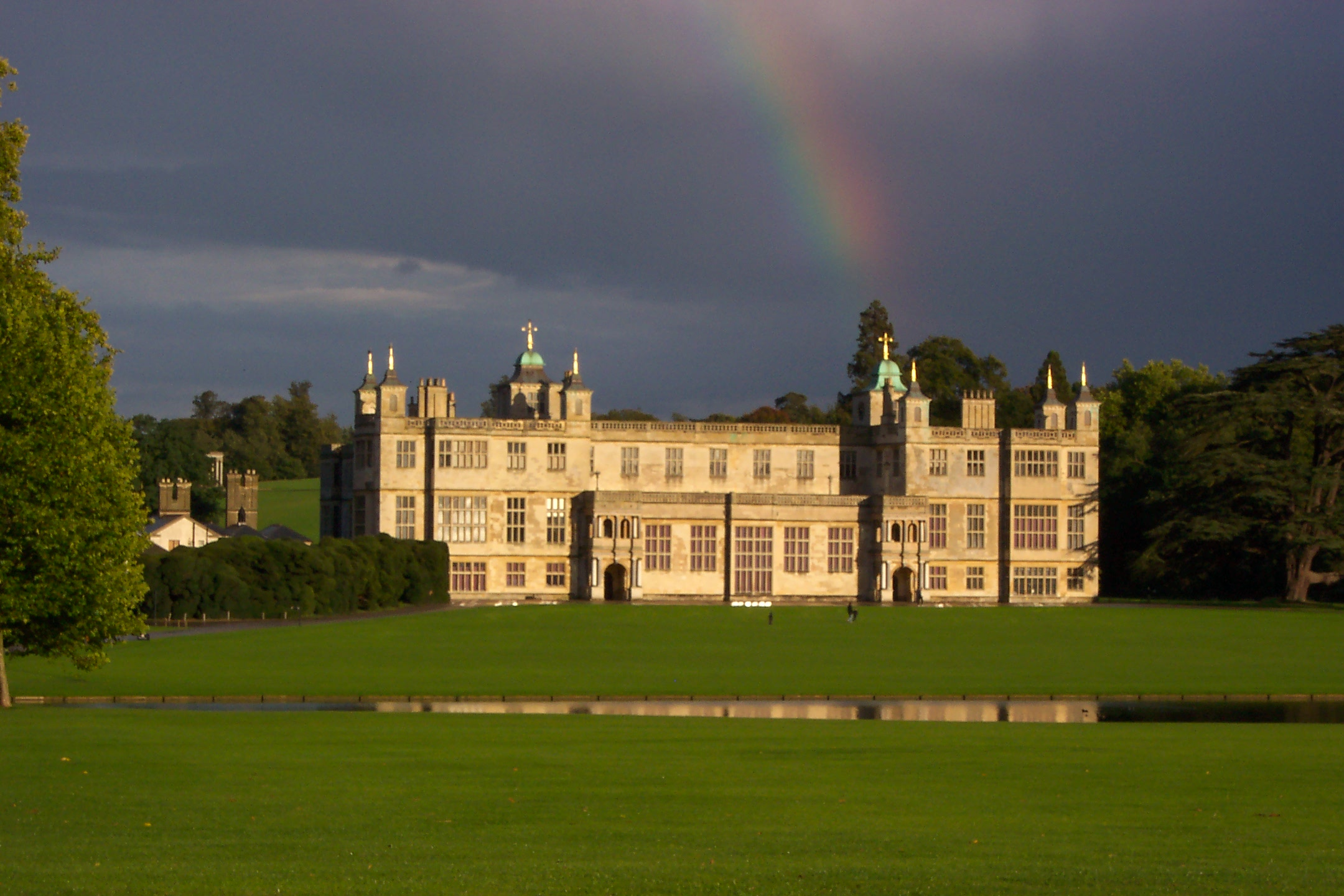
Audley End, the former seat of the Barons Braybrooke

Baron Braybrooke, of Braybrooke in the County of Northampton, is a title in the Peerage of Great Britain. It was created in 1788 for John Griffin, 4th Baron Howard de Walden, with remainder to his kinsman Richard Neville-Aldworth. Lord Howard de Walden was the son of William Whitwell and Anne Griffin, daughter of James Griffin, 2nd Baron Griffin of Braybrooke, who was the son of Edward Griffin, 1st Baron Griffin of Braybrooke, and his wife Lady Essex Howard, eldest daughter of James Howard, 3rd Earl of Suffolk and 3rd Baron Howard de Walden.

In 1749 Whitwell assumed the surname of Griffin, and the same year he was elected to Parliament for Andover, a seat he held until 1784. The latter year the barony of Howard de Walden, which had been in abeyance since the death of his great-great-grandfather the third Earl of Suffolk in 1689, was called out of abeyance in favour of him, and he was summoned to the House of Lords as the fourth Baron Howard de Walden. Moreover, the barony of Griffin of Braybrooke held by his maternal ancestors had become extinct on the death of his uncle, the third Baron, in 1743. In 1788 the Braybrooke title was revived when Griffin was created Baron Braybrooke.

== History ==
Lord Braybrooke's Name Act 1798
- Act of Parliament
- Parliament of Great Britain
- Long title: An act to enable the right honourable Richard Aldworth lord Braybrocke, baron of Braybrooke, and Richard Neville, Henry Neville, George Neville, and William Neville, and all and every other son and sons of the said Richard Aldworth lord Braybrooke, and their issue male, respectively, when they shall respectively become beneficially entitled to the possession, or to the rents and profits, of certain estates devised by the will of the late right honourable John Griffin, lord Howard de Walden and lord Braybrooke, deceased, or shall become entitled to the peerage of the barony of Braybrooke in possession, to use and take the surname, and bear the arms, of Griffin, pursuant to the said will.
- Citation: 38 Geo. 3. c. 8 Pr.
- Territorial extent: Great Britain

Dates
- Royal assent: 20 February 1798
- Commencement: 20 February 1798 (Note: The Acts of Parliament (Commencement) Act 1793.)

Status: Current legislation

On Lord Braybrooke and Howard de Walden's death in 1797, the barony of Howard de Walden again fell into abeyance (it was called out of abeyance in 1799; see the Baron Howard de Walden). He was succeeded in the barony of Braybrooke according to the special remainder by his kinsman Richard Neville-Aldworth, the second Baron. He also inherited the family seat of Audley End in Essex, to add to his own at Billingbear Park in Berkshire. The same year he succeeded in the barony, Neville-Aldworth assumed by act of Parliament, Lord Braybrooke's Name Act 1798 (38 Geo. 3. c. 8 Pr.), the surname of Griffin for himself, his eldest son and one of his daughters (one of his younger sons was George Neville-Grenville, Dean of Windsor). He had previously represented Grampound, Buckingham and Reading in Parliament and later served as Lord Lieutenant of Essex. Lord Braybrooke was the husband of Catherine Grenville, daughter of the former Prime Minister George Grenville.

Their eldest son, the third Baron, sat in the House of Commons as a representative for Thirsk, Saltash, Buckingham and Berkshire.

Latimer Neville, 6th Baron Braybrooke was Master of Magdalene College, Cambridge for over 50 years from 1853–1904.

Lieutenant Richard, 8th Baron Braybroke, Grenadier Guards, was killed on active service in Tunisia on 23 January 1943, and is buried in the Medjez el Bab Commonwealth War Graves Cemetery.

The tenth Baron, who succeeded his father in 1990, served as Lord Lieutenant of Essex from 1992 to 2000. Lord Braybrooke was awarded an Honorary Doctorate from the University of Essex in July 2000. Lord Braybrooke had eight daughters but no sons.

In 2017, the title was inherited by the tenth Baron's fourth cousin once removed, Richard Neville, born in 1977. The eleventh Baron is a great-great-great-grandson of George Neville-Grenville, Dean of Windsor, third son of the second Baron.

The family seat of Billingbear House burnt down in 1924. In 1948, Audley End house (but not the estate and contents) was sold, while creating the incorporeal hereditament right to repurchase, to the Ministry of Works and later came into the care of English Heritage.

The Barons Braybrooke remain the hereditary visitors of Magdalene College, Cambridge but no longer have the power to appoint the master. Following an amendment to the college statutes, approved in 2012, the master is now appointed by the governing body of the college.

== Barons Braybrooke (1788–) ==
- John Griffin Griffin, 1st Baron Braybrooke (1719–1797) (also 4th Baron Howard de Walden)
- Richard Neville Aldworth Neville (1717–1793) (kinsman of the 1st Baron)
  - Richard Griffin, 2nd Baron Braybrooke (1750–1825) (kinsman of the 1st Baron, succeeded according to special remainder)
    - Richard Griffin, 3rd Baron Braybrooke (1783–1858)
      - Richard Cornwallis Neville, 4th Baron Braybrooke (1820–1861)
      - Charles Cornwallis Neville, 5th Baron Braybrooke (1823–1902)
      - Latimer Neville, 6th Baron Braybrooke (1827–1904)
        - Henry Neville, 7th Baron Braybrooke (1855–1941)
          - Richard Henry Cornwallis Neville, 8th Baron Braybrooke (1918–1943)
        - Hon. Grey Neville (1857–1920)
          - Henry Seymour Neville, 9th Baron Braybrooke (1897–1990)
            - Robin Henry Charles Neville, 10th Baron Braybrooke (1932–2017)
              - Hon. Caroline Emma Neville (1963–)
    - Hon. George Neville-Grenville (1789–1854)
      - Ralph Neville-Grenville (1817–1886)
        - Sir George Neville (1850–1923)
          - Philip Lloyd Neville (1888–1976)
            - George Neville (1943–2004)
              - Richard Ralph Neville, 11th Baron Braybrooke (1977–)
                - (1) Hon. Edward Alfred Neville (2015–)
            - John Neville (1944–2007)
              - (2) Edward Grey Neville (1982–)

The heir apparent is the present holder's son, the Hon. Edward Alfred Neville (born 2015).
The heir apparent's heir presumptive is the present holder's first cousin, Edward Grey Neville (born 1982).
There are no further heirs to the barony.

== Arms ==
Coat of arms of Baron Braybrooke

Coronet
A Coronet of a Baron
Crest
A Bull statant Argent collared and chained Or
Escutcheon
Quarterly: 1st and 4th, Gules in a Saltire Argent a Rose of the field barbed and seeded proper (Neville); 2nd and 3rd, Or fretty Gules on a Canton of the first a Lymphad Sable
Supporters
On either side a Lion reguardant Argent maned and tufted Sable gorged with a Chaplet of Olive Vert
Motto
Ne Vile Velis (Incline to nothing base)

== See also ==
- Baron Howard de Walden
- Earl of Suffolk
- George Neville-Grenville, Dean of Windsor
- Ralph Neville-Grenville, Conservative MP
