= Richard Griffin, 2nd Baron Braybrooke =

English politician and peer (1750–1825)

The Right Honourable The Lord Braybrooke
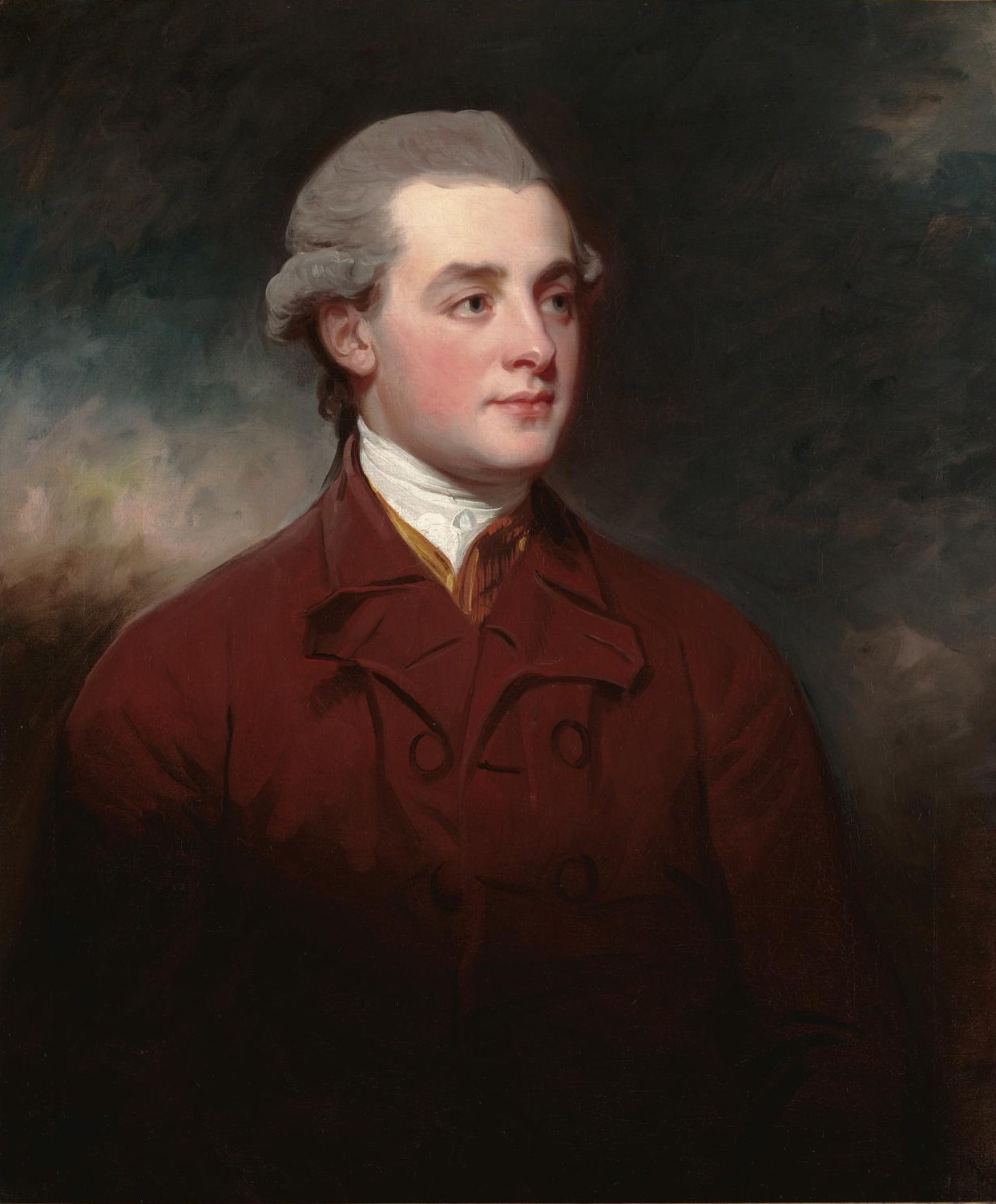
- Portrait of Lord Braybrooke, by George Romney

Member of Parliament for Reading
- In office 1782–1797 Serving with Francis Annesley
- Preceded by: John Dodd; Francis Annesley
- Succeeded by: Francis Annesley; John Simeon

Member of Parliament for Buckingham
- In office 1780–1782 Serving with James Grenville
- Preceded by: James Grenville; Richard Grenville
- Succeeded by: James Grenville; William Grenville

Member of Parliament for Grampound
- In office 1774–1780 Serving with Hon. Sir Joseph Yorke
- Preceded by: Grey Cooper; Charles Wolfran Cornwall
- Succeeded by: Sir John Ramsden; Thomas Lucas

Personal details
- Born: Richard Aldworth; 3 July 1750 Duke Street, Westminster
- Died: 28 February 1825 (aged 74) Billingbear House
- Spouse: Catherine Grenville (m. 1780; died 1796)
- Children: 10, including: Richard Griffin, 3rd Baron Braybrooke; Henry Neville-Grenville; George Neville-Grenville; Mary Glynne; Caroline Thompson, Baroness Wenlock
- Parent(s): Richard Neville Aldworth Neville; Magdalen Calandrini
- Education: Merton College, Oxford

Richard Griffin, 2nd Baron Braybrooke (3 July 1750 – 28 February 1825) was an English politician and peer. He was known as Richard Aldworth-Neville or Richard Aldworth Griffin-Neville until 1797.

== Early life ==
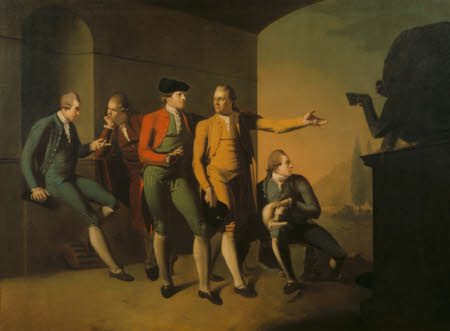
A Grand Tour Group of Five Gentlemen in Rome (c.1773), group portrait attributed to John Brown. To the right of the guide, with a spaniel on his knee, is the future 2nd Baron Braybrooke. The others of the party are: John Staples, James Byres, Sir William Young, 2nd Baronet, and Thomas Orde-Powlett, 1st Baron Bolton.

Aldworth was born on 3 July 1750 in Duke Street, Westminster. He was the only son and heir of Richard Neville Aldworth Neville and the former Magdalen Calandrini. His father was a diplomat who served as MP for Reading, Wallingford, and Tavistock. His only sibling was sister Frances, who became the wife of Francis Jalabert.

His maternal grandfather was Francis Calandrini, first syndic (or civil magistrate) of Geneva. His paternal grandparents were Richard Aldworth of Stanlake, and the former Catherine Neville (a daughter of Richard Neville of Billingbear House). His father assumed the name and arms of Neville in August 1762, when, on the death of the Countess of Portsmouth (widow of his maternal uncle Henry Neville Grey before her marriage to John Wallop, 1st Earl of Portsmouth), he succeeded to the estate of Billingbear.

He matriculated at Merton College, Oxford, on 20 June 1768, was created M.A. 4 July 1771, D.C.L. 3 July 1810, and was incorporated LL.D. of Cambridge in 1819.

== Career ==
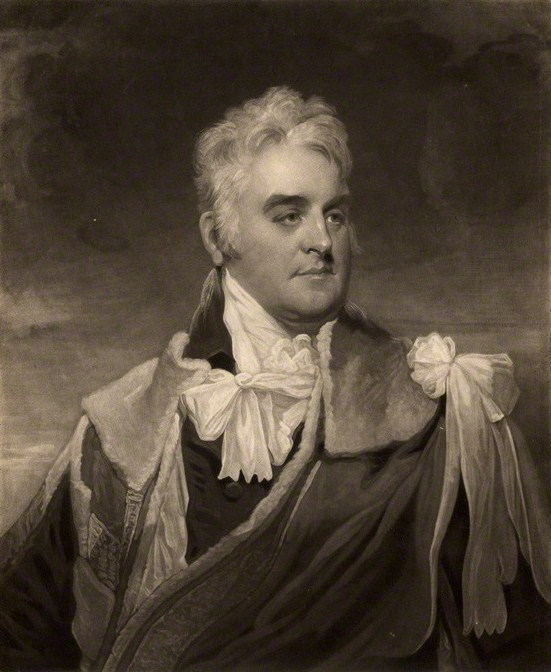
Richard Griffin, 2nd Baron Braybrooke, 1810 engraving

Neville served as a Lieutenant in the Berkshire Militia in 1779. He was Member of Parliament for Grampound from 10 October 1774 till the dissolution in 1780, and for Buckingham in the next parliament till his appointment as agent to the Buckinghamshire Militia in February 1782. On the 21st of the same month he was returned for Reading, and was re-elected there for the three succeeding parliaments (1784, 1790, 1796).

On the death, in May 1797, of his kinsman John Griffin, 4th Baron Howard de Walden, by whom he had been adopted as heir, Griffin-Neville succeeded to the Braybrooke barony. He assumed the additional surname and arms of Griffin, and came into possession of the Audley End estate until the death in 1802 of Dr. Parker, son-in-law of the late Baron, who had a life interest in it. Braybrooke increased the property by the purchase of neighbouring manors and farms from the Earls of Bristol and Suffolk, and other acquisitions.

He became Lord Lieutenant of Essex and custos rotulorum of the county immediately after his accession to the peerage (19 January 1798), and was also vice-admiral of Essex, recorder of Saffron Walden, high steward of Wokingham, hereditary visitor of Magdalene College, Cambridge, and provost marshal of Jamaica.

== Personal life ==
On 19 June 1780 Aldworth-Neville married Catherine Grenville at Stowe House, Buckinghamshire. Catherine was the youngest daughter of Prime Minister George Grenville and the former Elizabeth Wyndham (daughter of Sir William Wyndham, 3rd Baronet and sister of Charles Wyndham, 2nd Earl of Egremont). Together, they were the parents of six sons (including twins who died immediately after birth) and four daughters:

- Richard Griffin, 3rd Baron Braybrooke (1783–1858), who married Lady Jane Cornwallis, eldest daughter of Charles Cornwallis, 2nd Marquess Cornwallis and Lady Louisa Gordon (fourth daughter of Alexander Gordon, 4th Duke of Gordon) in 1819.
- Hon. Henry Neville-Grenville (d. 1809), a Captain in the dragoons who died while serving in Spain after the Battle of Talavera.
- Hon. George Neville-Grenville (1789–1854), Dean of Windsor and Chaplain-in-Ordinary to Queen Victoria; he married his second half-cousin once removed, Lady Charlotte Legge, second daughter of George Legge, 3rd Earl of Dartmouth and Lady Frances Finch (second daughter of Heneage Finch, 3rd Earl of Aylesford) in 1816.
- William Neville-Grenville, who died young.
- Hon. Catherine Neville-Grenville (d. 1841), who died unmarried.
- Hon. Mary Neville-Grenville, who married Sir Stephen Glynne, 8th Baronet, of Hawarden.
- Hon. Caroline Neville-Grenville (d. 1868), who married Paul Thompson, 1st Baron Wenlock in 1817.
- Hon. Frances Neville-Grenville, who died young.

Lord Braybrooke died on 28 February 1825, after a lingering illness, at his seat at Billingbear House, and was buried at Laurence Waltham. He was succeeded in the barony by his eldest surviving son, Richard.

Parliament of Great Britain
Preceded by Grey Cooper; Charles Wolfran Cornwall	Member of Parliament for Grampound; 1774–1780; With: Hon. Sir Joseph Yorke	Succeeded by Sir John Ramsden; Thomas Lucas
Preceded by James Grenville; Richard Grenville	Member of Parliament for Buckingham; 1780–1782; With: James Grenville	Succeeded by James Grenville; William Grenville
Preceded by John Dodd; Francis Annesley	Member of Parliament for Reading; 1782–1797; With: Francis Annesley	Succeeded by Francis Annesley; John Simeon
Honorary titles
Preceded by The Lord Howard de Walden and Braybrooke	Lord Lieutenant and Vice-Admiral of Essex; 1798–1825	Succeeded by The Viscount Maynard
Peerage of Great Britain
Preceded by John Griffin	Baron Braybrooke; 1797–1825	Succeeded by Richard Griffin
