= Richard Neville, 4th Baron Braybrooke =

British archaeologist

Richard Cornwallis Neville, 4th Baron Braybrooke (17 March 1820 – 4 February 1861) was a British archaeologist.

== Life ==
Neville, third son of Richard Griffin Neville, 3rd Baron Braybrooke, was born in Charles Street in the parish of St. George, Hanover Square, London, on 17 March 1820, and was educated at Eton from 1832 till 1837. On 2 June 1837 he was gazetted an ensign and lieutenant in the Grenadier Guards, and served with that regiment in Canada during the rebellion in the winter of 1838. On 5 November in that year he had a narrow escape from drowning in the St. Lawrence. On 31 December 1841 he was promoted to be lieutenant and captain, and on 2 Sept. 1842 retired from the service.

For some years, aided by his sister, he devoted himself to the study of natural history, and to the investigation of the Roman and Saxon remains in the neighbourhood of Audley End, Essex, and ultimately attained a distinguished position among the practical archæologists of his day. At one period geology was his favourite pursuit, and he formed a collection of fossils, which he presented to the museum at Saffron Walden. He also brought together a beautiful series of stuffed birds. The most remarkable feature, however, of his collections at Audley End is the museum of antiquities of every period, the creation of his own exertions, and consisting almost exclusively of objects brought to light at the Roman station at Great Chesterford, or at other sites of Roman occupation in the vicinity of Audley End, and at the Saxon cemeteries excavated under his directions near Little Wilbraham and Linton in Cambridgeshire during 1851 and 1852. On 25 March 1847 he had been elected a fellow of the Society of Antiquaries, and from time to time he made communications to that body regarding his explorations (cf. Archæologia, xxxii. 350–4, 357–6). To the 'Journal of the British Archæological Association' he also communicated memoirs (cf. iii. 208–13). To the 'Journal of the Archæological Institute,’ of which society he became a vice-president in 1850, he was a frequent contributor (Journal, vi. 14–26, viii. 27–35, x. 224–34, xi. 207–15, xiii. 1–13). To the 'Transactions of the Essex Archæological Society' he sent a list of potters' names upon Samian ware (i. 141–8), and notes on Roman Essex (i. 191–200). On the death of John Disney in 1857 he was elected president of the society.

In March 1858 he succeeded as fourth Baron Braybrooke. He was hereditary visitor of Magdalene College, Cambridge, high steward of Wokingham, Berkshire, and vice-lieutenant of the county of Essex. He died at Audley End on 22 Feb. 1861, having married on 27 Jan. 1852 Lady Charlotte Sarah Graham Toler, sixth daughter of Hector Graham-Toler, 2nd Earl of Norbury. She was born 26 Dec. 1826; married secondly, on 6 Nov. 1862, Frederic Hetley, M.D., of Norwood, and died on 4 Feb. 1867.

== Works ==
Braybrooke's separately issued works were:
1. 'Antiqua Explorata, being the result of Excavations made at Chesterford,’ (Saffron Walden, 1847).
2. 'Sepulchra Exposita, or an Account of the Opening of some Barrows,’ 1848.
3. 'Saxon Obsequies, illustrated by Ornaments and Weapons discovered in a Cemetery near Little Wilbraham, Cambridgeshire, during the Autumn of 1851,’ 1852.
4. 'Catalogue of Rings in the Collection of R. C. Neville,’ 1856.
5. 'The Romance of the Ring, or the History and Antiquity of Finger Rings' (printed for private circulation in 1856).

Peerage of Great Britain
Preceded by Richard Griffin	Baron Braybrooke; 1858–1861	Succeeded by Charles Neville
