= Richard Griffin, 3rd Baron Braybrooke =

British Whig politician

Richard Griffin, 3rd Baron Braybrooke (26 September 1783 – 13 March 1858), known as Richard Neville until 1797 and as the Hon. Richard Griffin between 1797 and 1825, was a British Whig politician and literary figure.

Billingbear House in Berkshire, the Neville family seat

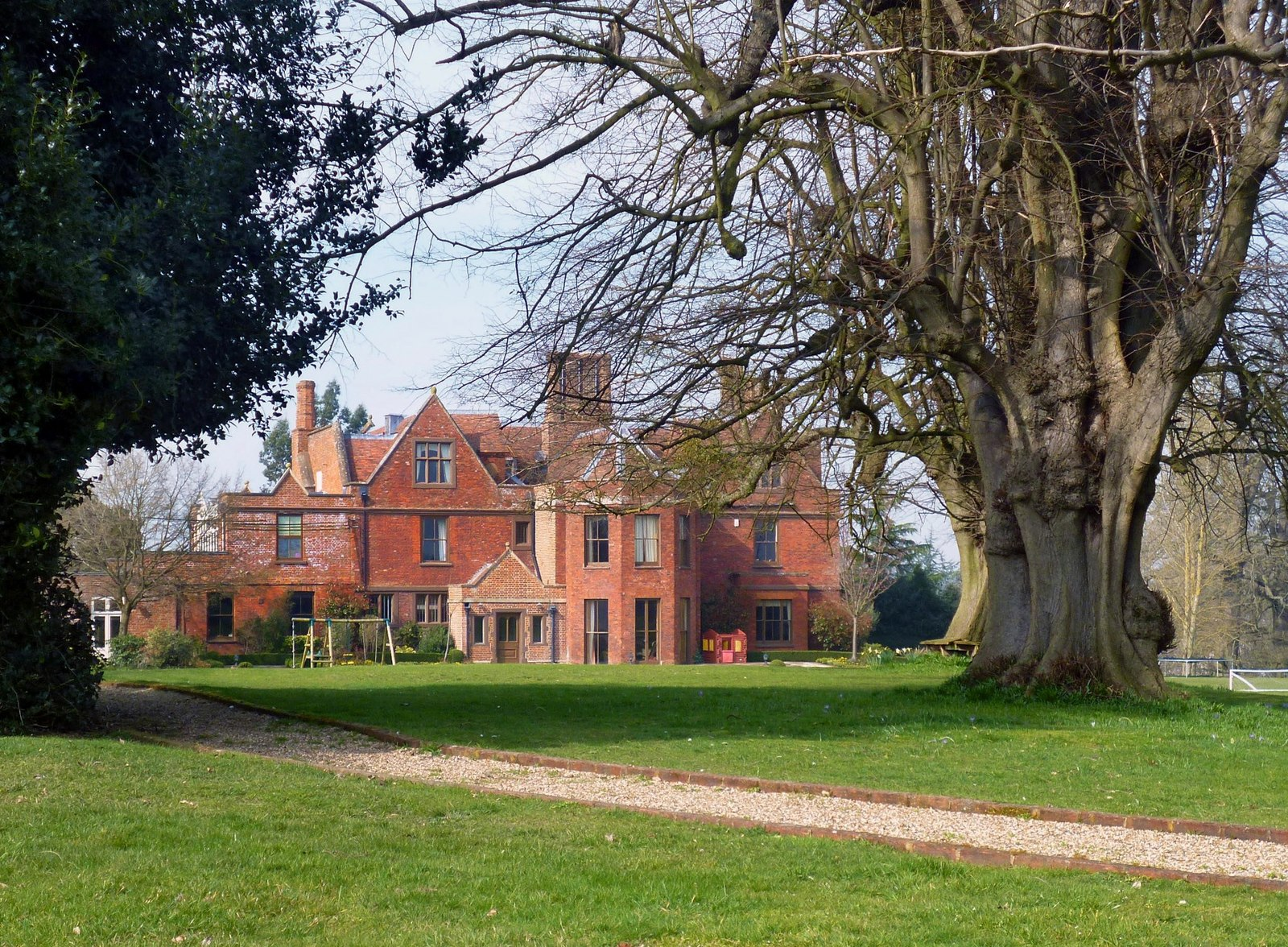
Stanlake Park, Berkshire, a Neville property

== Background and education ==
Born at Stanlake Park at Ruscombe in Berkshire, Braybrooke was the son of Richard Griffin, 2nd Baron Braybrooke, and Catherine, daughter of Prime Minister George Grenville. His father had inherited the barony as well as Audley End from his kinsman, John Whitwell, 4th Baron Howard de Walden and 1st Baron Braybrooke, in 1797. He was educated at Eton and Christ Church, Oxford, also taking a degree as nobleman at Magdalene College, Cambridge. In 1797 he assumed, alongside his father, by Royal licence the surname of Griffin in lieu of his patronymic. He served as a captain in the Royal Berkshire Militia 1803–4.

== Political career ==
Braybrooke was returned to Parliament for Thirsk in 1805, a seat he held until 1806, and then represented Saltash in 1807, Buckingham between 1807 and 1812 and Berkshire between 1812 and 1825. The latter year he succeeded his father in the barony and took his seat in the House of Lords.

== Writings ==
Braybrooke was the editor of an edition of the diary of Samuel Pepys published in 1825. He also published The History of Audley End and Saffron Walden (1836) and The private correspondence of Lady Cornwallis, 1613-1644 (1842). In 1838 he became a Fellow of the Society of Antiquaries. Between 1853 and 1858 he served as president of the Camden Society.

== Family ==
Lord Braybrooke married Lady Jane, daughter of Charles Cornwallis, 2nd Marquess Cornwallis, in 1819. They had five sons and three daughters. She died in September 1856, aged 57. Lord Braybrooke survived her by two years and died at Audley End in March 1858, aged 74. He was succeeded in the barony by his eldest son, Richard.

Parliament of the United Kingdom
Preceded by Sir Gregory Page-Turner, Bt; William Frankland	Member of Parliament for Thirsk; 1805–1806; With: William Frankland	Succeeded by Robert Greenhill; James Topping
Preceded by Matthew Russell; Arthur Champernowne	Member of Parliament for Saltash; 1807; With: William Fremantle	Succeeded by Matthew Russell; John Pedley
Preceded by Thomas Grenville; Sir John Borlase Warren, Bt	Member of Parliament for Buckingham; 1807–1812; With: Thomas Grenville 1807–1812; Lord George Grenville 1810–1812	Succeeded by Viscount Ebrington; William Fremantle
Preceded by George Vansittart; Charles Dundas	Member of Parliament for Berkshire; 1812–1825; With: Charles Dundas	Succeeded by Charles Dundas; Robert Palmer
Peerage of Great Britain
Preceded by Richard Griffin	Baron Braybrooke; 1825–1858	Succeeded by Richard Neville
Professional and academic associations
Preceded by Edward Maltby	President of the Surtees Society; 1840–43	Succeeded by The Earl Fitzwilliam
