= Grey Neville =

English landowner and politician

Grey Neville (23 September 1681 – 24 April 1723) of Billingbear, Berkshire was an English landowner and politician who sat in the English House of Commons from 1705 to 1708 and in the British House of Commons between 1708 and 1723.

== Early life ==
Neville was the elder son of Richard Neville of Billingbear House in Berkshire and his wife Katherine Grey, the daughter of Ralph Grey, 2nd Baron Grey of Werke. He was born in the parish of St Giles's-in-the-Fields, London, on 23 September 1681. His brother was Henry Neville, later Henry Grey. He was educated privately in 1691 and was admitted at Middle Temple in 1699. From 1699 to 1700, he travelled abroad in the Netherlands, Germany, Switzerland, Italy and France recording his observations in a diary and discussing theology in depth. When he returned he subscribed to the SPCK and the SPG, and for a while attended their meetings regularly. This enthusiasm earned him the nickname ‘Bishop Neville’.

After a few years, he left the Established Church and joined Thomas Bradbury’s Independent congregation in Fetter Lane. He married Elizabeth Boteler, daughter of Sir John Boteler of Watton Woodhall, Hertfordshire on 14 February 1706.

== Political career ==
Billingbear House, Berkshire, in 1669.

Neville was elected Member of Parliament for Abingdon at the 1705 general election on 10 May. His Tory opponent, Sir Simon Harcourt, raised a petition against his return and was unsuccessful. At the 1708 general election, Neville was returned unopposed as MP for Wallingford, but was defeated in contests in 1710 and 1713. He was also defeated at Berwick-upon-Tweed in 1713. At the 1715 general election he was returned unopposed as MP for Berwick-upon-Tweed with fellow dissenter John Barrington. He was appointed as one of the Commissioners for Stating the Debts due to the Army in 1715 and held the post until 1721. In 1717, he inherited Billingbear in the death of his father. He was returned for Berwick in a contest in the 1722 general election.

In Parliament, Neville was a Whigs loyalist. He supported the Act for naturalising foreign Protestants in 1708, voted for the impeachment of Henry Sacheverell, and generally acted with the Whigs. When the first split developed in the Whig party, he joined the Walpole faction, and voted with the majority which threw out the Peerage Bill of 1719. Neville's most prominent action as a member of the House of Commons was his defence in 1721 of James Craggs the elder and John Aislabie, former chancellor of the exchequer, who had been implicated in the affairs of the South Sea Company.

Neville died on 24 April 1723. He had one daughter who died without issue.

Parliament of England
| Preceded by Sir Simon Harcourt | Member of Parliament for Abingdon; 1705–1707 | Succeeded by Parliament of Great Britain |
Parliament of Great Britain
| Preceded by Parliament of England | Member of Parliament for Abingdon; 1707–1708 | Succeeded by Sir Simon Harcourt |
| Preceded by William Jennens; Clement Kent | Member of Parliament for Wallingford; 1708–1710; With: William Jennens 1708–1709; Thomas Renda 1709–1710 | Succeeded by Thomas Renda; Simon Harcourt |
| Preceded by Richard Hampden; William Orde | Member of Parliament for Berwick-upon-Tweed; 1715–1723; With: John Shute Barrington 1715–1723; Henry Grey 1723 | Succeeded by Henry Grey; William Kerr |
