= Ralph Grey =

Ralph Grey may refer to:

- Ralph Grey, Baron Grey of Naunton (1910–1999), last governor of Northern Ireland
- Ralph Grey (MP) (1819–1869), British Whig politician
- Ralph Grey, 2nd Baron Grey of Werke (1630–1675)
- Ralph Grey, 4th Baron Grey of Werke (died 1706), English peer who served as governor of Barbados

== See also ==
- Ralph Gray (disambiguation)
