= Ford Grey, 1st Earl of Tankerville =

English peer and politician (1655–1701)

The Right Honourable The Earl of Tankerville PC
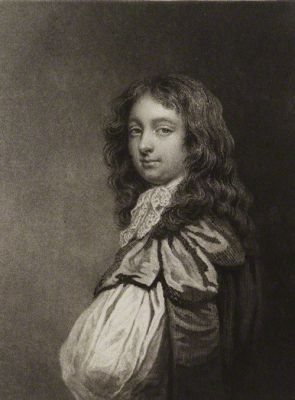

Lord Privy Seal
- In office 1700–1701
- Preceded by: The Viscount Lonsdale
- Succeeded by: The Marquess of Normanby

First Lord of the Treasury
- In office 1699–1700
- Preceded by: Charles Montagu
- Succeeded by: The Lord Godolphin

Personal details
- Born: Ford Grey; 20 July 1655 Harting, West Sussex
- Died: 24 June 1701 (aged 45)
- Spouse: Lady Mary Berkeley
- Relations: Ralph Grey, 4th Baron Grey of Warke (brother); Henry Grey (nephew)
- Children: Lady Mary Bennet; Lady Annabella Cecil
- Parent(s): Ralph Grey, 2nd Baron Grey of Werke; Catherine Ford

Ford Grey, 1st Earl of Tankerville, PC (20 July 1655 – 24 June 1701) was an English peer and politician.

== Early life ==
Grey was the eldest son of Ralph Grey, 2nd Baron Grey of Werke and Catherine Ford, daughter of Sir Edward Ford of Harting in West Sussex. He was baptised the day of his birth at Harting. His family seat was Chillingham Castle in Northumberland, which he inherited on his father's death in 1675.

His younger brother, Ralph was an officer in the Army and Whig MP for Berwick who served as the Governor of Barbados. His sister, Hon. Catherine Grey, married Richard Neville, MP for Berkshire.

== Career ==
In 1682 Grey achieved notoriety for being found guilty of seducing his wife's sister, Lady Henrietta Berkeley for which he was arrested, tried and ultimately freed. In 1683 he was arrested for involvement in the Rye House Plot but escaped from the Tower of London in July and fled with Lady Henrietta and her new husband to France. He later became one of the leaders of the Monmouth Rebellion, landing with Monmouth at Lyme Regis in June 1685. He was in command of the cavalry, and its defeat on two occasions may have been caused by his cowardice, possibly even by his treachery. He was taken prisoner and condemned for high treason, but he obtained a pardon by freely giving evidence against his former associates, and was restored to his honours in June 1686.

During the reign of William III he was made Privy Councillor on 11 May 1695 and, on 11 June 1695, created Viscount Glendale and Earl of Tankerville. From 1695 until his death he was a Commissioner of Greenwich Hospital; from November 1699 until November 1700, First Lord of the Treasury. During the absence of the King from June until October 1700, he was a Lord Justice of the Realm, and from November 1700 until his death, Lord Privy Seal.

== Personal life ==
Grey married Lady Mary Berkeley, daughter of George Berkeley, 1st Earl of Berkeley and his wife, Elizabeth Massingberd. They were the parents of at least two daughters:

- Lady Mary Grey (b. c. 1678), who married Charles Bennet, 2nd Lord Ossulston, on 3 July 1695. He was later created 1st Earl of Tankerville, new creation, and died on 31 May 1710.
- Lady Annabella Grey (d. 1698), who married John Cecil, 6th Earl of Exeter, in 1697 but died in August 1698 leaving no children.

He died on 24 June 1701. After Grey's death, Lady Mary married Richard Rooth of Epsom.

== In popular culture ==
In Sir Arthur Conan Doyle's novel about the Monmouth Rebellion, Micah Clarke (1889), Grey is represented as the character Lord Grey of Warke. In Aphra Behn's epistolary novel, Love-Letters Between a Nobleman and His Sister, Grey is represented as the character Philander. In the 1972 HTV series Pretenders, which also depicted the Monmouth Rebellion, Lord Grey was played by David Jackson.

Political offices
Preceded by Charles Montagu	First Lord of the Treasury; 1699–1700	Succeeded by Sidney Godolphin
Preceded by The Viscount Lonsdale	Lord Privy Seal; 1700–1701	Succeeded by The Marquess of Normanby
Peerage of England
New creation	Earl of Tankerville; 1695–1701	Extinct
Preceded by Ralph Grey	Baron Grey of Werke; 1675–1701	Succeeded by Ralph Grey
