= Richard Potenger =

British lawyer and politician

Richard Potenger, of Reading and Compton, Berkshire, (c.1690–1739) was a British lawyer and politician who sat in the House of Commons from 1727 to 1739.

Potenger was the eldest son of Nicholas Potenger of Pangbourne, Berkshire, and the Inner Temple. He was admitted at Inner Temple in 1704 and matriculated at Trinity College, Oxford on 20 October 1705, aged 15. In 1711 he was called to the bar. He married Anne Mason in April 1714. He came into the family properties of Maidenhatch, in Pangbourne, and in Compton.

Potenger was appointed Recorder of Reading in 1720 and he held the role for the rest of his life. At the 1727 British general election, he was returned after a contest as Member of Parliament for Reading. He voted with the Administration on the Hessians in 1730 and on the army in 1732, but against on the Excise Bill in 1733. He was returned in a contest at the 1734 British general election. In 1735 he was appointed 2nd Justice of Chester, and was returned again for Reading without a contest at the ensuing by-election.

Potenger died on 26 November 1739 leaving one son.

Parliament of Great Britain
Preceded by Anthony Blagrave; Clement Kent	Member of Parliament for Reading; 1727–1739; With: Richard Thompson 1727-1734; Henry Grey 1734-1739	Succeeded by John Blagrave; Henry Grey
