= Richard Thompson (MP for Reading) =

Jamaican merchant and member of British House of Commons

Richard Thompson (died 1735), of Coley, Reading, Berkshire, was a merchant in Jamaica and a Whig politician who sat in the House of Commons between 1720 and 1734.

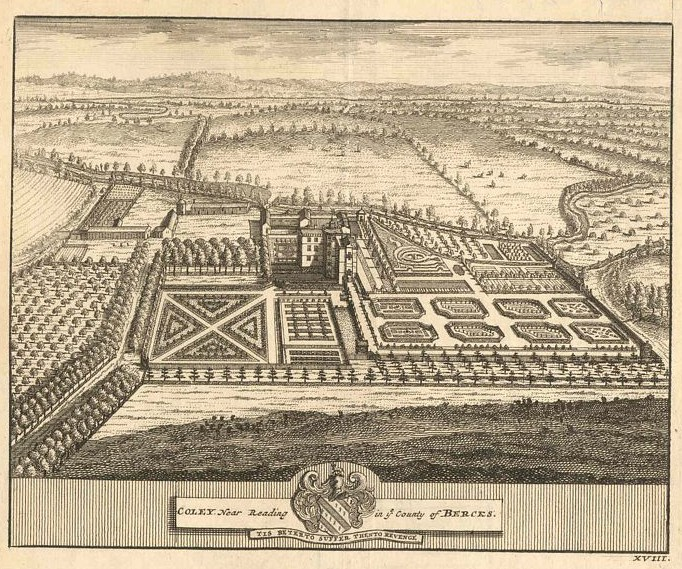
Coley Park c. 1700-1709

Thompson was the son of William Thompson and his wife Elizabeth. He owned a sugar plantation in Jamaica, maintained by many slaves. He became a colonel in the Jamaica militia and a member of the Jamaica assembly. From 1704 to 1711 he was a member of the council of Jamaica. In February 1711 he told the Board of Trade that he did not intend to return to Jamaica and was replaced on the local council. He married Jane Nicoll, and bought the manors of Whitley and Coley on the outskirts of Reading in 1727.

Thompson was High Sheriff of Berkshire for the year 1719 to 1720. In the course of the year there was an unexpected by-election at Reading on 15 March 1720, when he was returned in a contest as a Whig Member of Parliament. Later in 1720 he was one of the patentees of the Royal Mining Company which was formed to develop gold and silver mines in Jamaica. After they invested their subscribers’ funds in the South Sea Company the company went into liquidation. Thompson was defeated at Reading at the 1722 British general election but was returned successfully at the 1727 British general election. He voted for the Administration on the army in 1732 and on the Excise Bill in 1733. He did not stand at the 1734 British general election.

Thompson probably died before the end of 1736 leaving three daughters, Frances, Jane and Ann who married Sir Philip Jennings-Clerke, 1st Baronet.

Parliament of Great Britain
Preceded by Charles Cadogan; Owen Buckingham	Member of Parliament for Reading; British general election 1720–1722; With: Charles Cadogan	Succeeded by Anthony Blagrave; Clement Kent
Preceded by Anthony Blagrave; Clement Kent	Member of Parliament for Reading; 1727–1734; With: Richard Potenger	Succeeded by Richard Potenger; Henry Grey
