= List of acts of the Parliament of England from 1706 =

This is a list of acts of the Parliament of England for the year 1706.

For acts passed during the period 1707–1800, see the list of acts of the Parliament of Great Britain. See also the list of acts of the Parliament of Scotland, and the list of acts of the Parliament of Ireland.

For acts passed from 1801 onwards, see the list of acts of the Parliament of the United Kingdom. For acts of the devolved parliaments and assemblies in the United Kingdom, see the list of acts of the Scottish Parliament, the list of acts of the Northern Ireland Assembly, and the list of acts and measures of Senedd Cymru; see also the list of acts of the Parliament of Northern Ireland.

For medieval statutes, etc. that are not considered to be acts of Parliament, see the list of English statutes.

See also the List of ordinances and acts of the Parliament of England, 1642–1660 for ordinances and acts passed by the Long Parliament and other bodies without royal assent, and which were not considered to be valid legislation following the Restoration in 1660.

The number shown after each act's title is its chapter number. Acts are cited using this number, preceded by the years of the reign during which the relevant parliamentary session was held; thus the Union with Ireland Act 1800 is cited as "39 & 40 Geo. 3. c. 67", meaning the 67th act passed during the session that started in the 39th year of the reign of George III and which finished in the 40th year of that reign. The modern convention is to use Arabic numerals in citations (thus "41 Geo. 3" rather than "41 Geo. III"). Acts of the last session of the Parliament of Great Britain and the first session of the Parliament of the United Kingdom are both cited as "41 Geo. 3".

Acts passed by the Parliament of England did not have a short title; however, some of these acts have subsequently been given a short title by acts of the Parliament of the United Kingdom, such as the Short Titles Act 1896 (59 & 60 Vict. c. 14).

Acts passed by the Parliament of England were deemed to have come into effect on the first day of the session in which they were passed. Because of this, the years given in the list below may in fact be the year before a particular act was passed.

== 6 Ann. ==
The second session of the 2nd Parliament of Queen Anne, which met from 3 December 1706 until 8 April 1707.

This session was also traditionally cited as 6 Anne, 6 A, 5 Ann. (Ruffhead's The Statutes at Large) or 5 A.

=== Public acts ===
Short title	Citation	Royal assent
Long title
Land Tax Act 1706 or the Taxation Act 1706 (repealed)	6 Ann. c. 1 (Note: This is the citation in The Statutes of the Realm.); 5 Ann. c. 1 (Note: This is the citation in The Statutes at Large.)	21 December 1706
An Act for granting an Aid to Her Majesty, by a Land Tax, to be raised in the Year One Thousand Seven Hundred and Seven. (Repealed by Statute Law Revision Act 1867 (30 & 31 Vict. c. 59))
Taxation (No. 2) Act 1706 (repealed)	6 Ann. c. 2; 5 Ann. c. 19	27 March 1707
An Act for continuing the Duties on Low Wines and Spirits of the First Extraction, and the Duties payable by Hawkers, Pedlars, and Petty Chapmen; and Part of the Duties on Stamped Vellum, Parchment, and Paper, and the late Duties on Sweets, and the One Third Subsidy of Tonnage and Poundage; and for settling and establishing a Fund thereby, and by the Application of certain Overplus-monies and otherwise, for Payment of Annuities, to be sold, for raising a further Supply to Her Majesty, for the Service of the Year One Thousand Seven Hundred and Seven, and other Uses therein expressed. (Repealed by Statute Law Revision Act 1867 (30 & 31 Vict. c. 59))
Royal Lustring Company Act 1706 (repealed)	6 Ann. c. 3; 5 Ann. c. 20	27 March 1707
An Act for the better Encouragement of the Royal Lustring Company. (Repealed by Statute Law Revision Act 1867 (30 & 31 Vict. c. 59))
Bedfordshire and Buckinghamshire Roads Act 1706	6 Ann. c. 4; 5 Ann. c. 21	27 March 1707
An Act for repairing the Highways between Fornhill, in the County of Bedford, and the Town of Stoney Stratford, in the County of Buckingham.
Taxation (No. 3) Act 1706 (repealed)	6 Ann. c. 5; 5 Ann. c. 2	21 December 1706
An Act for continuing the Duties upon Malt, Mum, Cyder, and Perry, for the Service of the Year One Thousand Seven Hundred and Seven. (Repealed by Statute Law Revision Act 1867 (30 & 31 Vict. c. 59))
Duke of Marlborough (Annuity) Act 1706	6 Ann. c. 6; 5 Ann. c. 3	21 December 1706
An Act for the settling of the Honours and Dignities of John Duke of Marlborough upon his Posterity; and annexing the Honour and Manor of Woodstock, and House of Bleinheim to go along with the said Honours.
Duke of Marlborough (Pension) Act 1706 (repealed)	6 Ann. c. 7; 5 Ann. c. 4	28 January 1707
An Act for settling upon John Duke of Marlborough and his Posterity a Pension of Five Thousand Pounds per Annum, for the more Honourable Support of their Dignities, in like Manner as his Honours and Dignities, and the Honour and Manor of Woodstock, and House of Bleinheim, are already limited and settled. (Repealed by Statute Law Revision Act 1948 (11 & 12 Geo. 6. c. 62))
Maintenance of Church of England Act 1706	6 Ann. c. 8; 5 Ann. c. 5	13 February 1707
An Act for securing the Church of England, as by Law established. (Repealed for Northern Ireland by Statute Law Revision Act 1950 (14 Geo. 6. c. 6))
Burglaries, etc. Act 1706 (repealed)	6 Ann. c. 9; 5 Ann. c. 6	13 February 1707
An Act for repealing a Clause in an Act, intituled, "An Act for the better apprehending, prosecuting, and punishing Felons, that commit Burglaries, Housebreaking, or Robberies, in Shops, Ware-houses, Coach-houses, or Stables, or that steal Horses." (Note: Clerks of Assize (Fees) Act 1698 (10 Will. 3. c. 12)) (Repealed for England and Wales by Criminal Statutes Repeal Act 1827 (7 & 8 Geo. 4. c. 27) and for India by Criminal Law (India) Act 1828 (9 Geo. 4. c. 74))
Yarmouth Coal Import Duties (Freemen, etc.) Act 1706 (repealed)	6 Ann. c. 10; 5 Ann. c. 7	13 February 1707
An Act for regulating and ascertaining the Duties to be paid by the Unfreemen, Importers of Coals into the Port and Borough of Great Yarmouth, in the County of Norfolk. (Repealed by Statute Law Revision Act 1948 (11 & 12 Geo. 6. c. 62))
Union with Scotland Act 1706	6 Ann. c. 11; 5 Ann. c. 8	6 March 1707
An Act for a Union of the Two Kingdoms of England and Scotland.
Prison (Escape) Act 1706 (repealed)	6 Ann. c. 12; 5 Ann. c. 9	6 March 1707
An Act for rendring more effectual an Act, passed in the First Year of Her Majesties Reign, intituled, "An Act for the better preventing Escapes out of the Queen's Bench and Fleet Prisons." (Note: Escape of Debtors from Prison Act 1702 (1 Ann. St. 2. c. 6)) (Repealed by Sheriffs Act 1887 (50 & 51 Vict. c. 55), Statute Law Revision Act 1887 (50 & 51 Vict. c. 59) and Statute Law Revision Act 1948 (11 & 12 Geo. 6. c. 62))
Bedfordshire Highways Act 1706 (repealed)	6 Ann. c. 13; 5 Ann. c. 10	6 March 1707
An Act for repairing the Highway between Hockliffe and Wooborne, in the County of Bedford. (Repealed by Hockliffe, Woburn and Newport Pagnell Roads Act 1821 (1 & 2 Geo. 4. c. lxxxv))
Hertfordshire Highways Act 1706 (repealed)	6 Ann. c. 14; 5 Ann. c. 11	6 March 1707
An Act for continuing the Acts formerly made, for repairing of the Highways in the County of Hertford. (Repealed by Hertfordshire Roads Act 1732 (6 Geo. 2. c. 24))
New Palace Yard, Westminster Act 1706	6 Ann. c. 15; 5 Ann. c. 12	6 March 1707
An Act for enlarging the Passage leading to New Palace-Yard, through The Gatehouse, Westminster.
Game Act 1706 (repealed)	6 Ann. c. 16; 5 Ann. c. 14	24 March 1707
An Act for the better Preservation of the Game. (Repealed by Game Act 1831 (1 & 2 Will. 4. c. 32))
Recruiting Act 1706 (repealed)	6 Ann. c. 17; 5 Ann. c. 15	24 March 1707
An Act for the better recruiting Her Majesty's Land Forces and the Marines, for the Year One Thousand Seven Hundred and Seven. (Repealed by Statute Law Revision Act 1867 (30 & 31 Vict. c. 59))
Mutiny Act 1706 (repealed)	6 Ann. c. 18; 5 Ann. c. 16	24 March 1707
An Act for continuing an Act, made in the Third and Fourth Years of Her Majesty's Reign, intituled, "An Act for punishing Mutiny and Desertion, and false Musters; and for the better Payment of the Army and Quarters." (Note: Mutiny Act 1704 (3 & 4 Ann. c. 5)) (Repealed by Statute Law Revision Act 1867 (30 & 31 Vict. c. 59))
Importation Act 1706 (repealed)	6 Ann. c. 19; 5 Ann. c. 17	24 March 1707
An Act to repeal all the Laws, prohibiting the Importation of Foreign Lace made of Thread. (Repealed by Statute Law Revision Act 1867 (30 & 31 Vict. c. 59))
Yorkshire (West Riding) Land Registry Act 1706 (repealed)	6 Ann. c. 20; 5 Ann. c. 18	24 March 1707
An Act for Enrolments of Bargains and Sales within the West-Riding of the County of York in the Register-office there lately provided; and for making the said Register more effectual. (Repealed by Yorkshire Registries Act 1884 (47 & 48 Vict. c. 54))
Taxation (No. 4) Act 1706 (repealed)	6 Ann. c. 21; 5 Ann. c. 13	24 March 1707
An Act for continuing the Duties upon Houses, to secure a Yearly Fund, for circulating Exchequer Bills, whereby a Sum, not exceeding Fifteen Hundred Thousand Pounds, is intended to be raised, for carrying on the War, (Note: The War of the Spanish Succession.) and other Her Majesty's Occasions. (Repealed by Statute Law Revision Act 1867 (30 & 31 Vict. c. 59))
Bankrupts Act 1706 (repealed)	6 Ann. c. 22; 5 Ann. c. 22	8 April 1707
An Act to explain and amend an Act of the last Session of Parliament, (Note: Bankruptcy Act 1705 (4 & 5 Ann. c. 4)) for preventing Frauds frequently committed by Bankrupts. (Repealed by Statute Law Revision Act 1867 (30 & 31 Vict. c. 59))
Thomas Brerewood's Estate and Thomas Pitkins' Creditors Act 1706 (repealed)	6 Ann. c. 23; 5 Ann. c. 23	8 April 1707
An Act to subject the Estate of Thomas Brerewood to the Creditors of Thomas Pitkin, notwithstanding any Agreement or Composition made by the Creditors of the said Thomas Pitkin. (Repealed by Statute Law Revision Act 1948 (11 & 12 Geo. 6. c. 62))
Queen Anne's Bounty Act 1706 (repealed)	6 Ann. c. 24; 5 Ann. c. 24	8 April 1707
An Act for discharging small Livings from their First Fruits and Tenths, and all Arrears thereof. (Repealed by First Fruits and Tenths Measure 1926 (16 & 17 Geo. 5. No. 5))
Crown Lands, Forfeited Estates (Ireland) Act 1706 (repealed)	6 Ann. c. 25; 5 Ann. c. 25	8 April 1707
An Act for making the Acts more effectual, for appropriating the forfeited Impropriations in Ireland, for the building of Churches, and augmenting poor Vicarages, in Ireland. (Repealed for Northern Ireland by Statute Law Revision Act 1950 (14 Geo. 6. c. 6))
Wiltshire Highways Act 1706 (repealed)	6 Ann. c. 26; 5 Ann. c. 26	8 April 1707
An Act for repairing the Highways between Sheppard Shord and The Devizes, and between the Top of Ashlington Hill and Rowdford, in the County of Wilts. (Repealed by Devizes Roads Act 1797 (37 Geo. 3. c. 154))
Taxation (No. 5) Act 1706 (repealed)	6 Ann. c. 27; 5 Ann. c. 27	8 April 1707
An Act for continuing several Subsidies, Impositions, and Duties; and for making Provisions therein mentioned, to raise Money, by Way of Loan, for the Service of the War, and other Her Majesty's necessary and important Occasions; and for ascertaining the Wine Measure. (Repealed by Statute Law Revision Act 1867 (30 & 31 Vict. c. 59))
Militia Act 1706 (repealed)	6 Ann. c. 28; 5 Ann. c. 28	8 April 1707
An Act for raising the Militia for the Year One Thousand Seven Hundred and Seven, notwithstanding the Month's Pay formerly advanced be not re-paid; and for an Accompt to be made of Trophy-money. (Repealed by Statute Law Revision Act 1867 (30 & 31 Vict. c. 59))
Duties on Salt, etc. Act 1706 (repealed)	6 Ann. c. 29; 5 Ann. c. 29	8 April 1707
An Act for Ease of Her Majesty's Subjects, in relation to the Duties upon Salt; and for making the like Allowances upon the Exportation of White Herrings, Flesh, Oatmeal, and Grain called Beer alias Bigg, as are to be made upon Exportation of the like from Scotland. (Repealed by Statute Law Revision Act 1867 (30 & 31 Vict. c. 59))
British Museum Act 1706 (repealed)	6 Ann. c. 30; 5 Ann. c. 30	8 April 1707
An Act for the better securing Her Majesty's Purchase of Cotton House, in Westminster. (Repealed by Statute Law Revision Act 1948 (11 & 12 Geo. 6. c. 62))
Apprehension of Housebreakers Act 1706 (repealed)	6 Ann. c. 31; 5 Ann. c. 31	8 April 1707
An Act for the encouraging the Discovery and apprehending of House-breakers. (Repealed by Sheriffs Act 1887 (50 & 51 Vict. c. 55))
Vagrants Act 1706 (repealed)	6 Ann. c. 32; 5 Ann. c. 32	8 April 1707
An Act for the Continuance of the Laws for the Punishment of Vagrants; and for making such Laws more effectual. (Repealed by Statute Law Revision Act 1867 (30 & 31 Vict. c. 59))
Accounting for Certain Debentures Act 1706 (repealed)	6 Ann. c. 33; 5 Ann. c. 33	8 April 1707
An Act for obliging John Rice to accompt for Debentures granted to him in the last Session of Parliament. (Repealed by Statute Law Revision Act 1867 (30 & 31 Vict. c. 59))
Continuance of Laws Act 1706 (repealed)	6 Ann. c. 34; 5 Ann. c. 34	8 April 1707
An Act for continuing the Laws therein mentioned, relating to the Poor, and to the buying and selling of Cattle in Smithfield; and for suppressing of Piracy. (Repealed by Statute Law Revision Act 1867 (30 & 31 Vict. c. 59))

=== Private acts ===
Short title	Citation	Royal assent
Long title
Naturalizing of Maria Margaret, Lady North and Grey Act 1706	6 Ann. c. 1 Pr. (Note: This is the citation in The Statutes of the Realm.); 5 Ann. c. 1 Pr. (Note: This is the citation in The Statutes at Large.)	21 December 1706
An Act for naturalizing Maria Margaret Lady North & Grey.
Neville's Name Act 1706	6 Ann. c. 2 Pr. 5 Ann. c. 2 Pr.	28 January 1707
An‌‌‌‌‌ ‌‌‌‌Act‌‌‌‌ ‌‌‌‌‌to‌‌‌‌‌ ‌‌enable‌‌‌‌ ‌‌‌‌Henry‌‌ ‌‌‌‌Grey‌‌‌‌,‌‌‌‌ ‌‌‌‌second‌‌‌‌ ‌‌‌‌Son‌‌‌‌ ‌‌‌‌‌of‌‌‌ ‌‌‌Richard‌‌‌ ‌‌‌Neville‌‌‌ ‌‌Esquire‌‌,‌‌ (Note: Richard Neville (the younger)) ‌to change his Name from Nevill to Grey, according to the Will of Ralph Lord Grey deceased. (Note: Ralph Grey, 4th Baron Grey of Werke)
Freedom of Ship Neptune Privateer Act 1706	6 Ann. c. 3 Pr. 5 Ann. c. 32 Pr.	28 January 1707
An Act to make the Ship called The Neptune Priveteer (a Foreign-built Ship, lately bought as a Wreck) a free Ship.
Freedom of Ship "Vigilantia" of Stad (Germany), lately a wreck.	6 Ann. c. 4 Pr. 5 Ann. c. 4 Pr.	28 January 1707
An Act to make the Ship Vigilantia, of Stad upon the River Elbe in Germany (lately a Wreck), a free Ship.
Tigh's Naturalization Act 1706	6 Ann. c. 5 Pr. 5 Ann. c. 5 Pr.	28 January 1707
An Act for naturalizing John Tigh.
Enabling the Treasury to compound with Benjamin Niccoll and his sureties for his debt to Her Majesty.	6 Ann. c. 6 Pr. 5 Ann. c. 6 Pr.	13 February 1707
An Act to enable the Lord High Treasurer, or Commissioners of the Treasury, for the Time being, to compound with Benjamine Niccoll, Citizen and late Merchant of London, and his Sureties, for the Debt owing by him to Her Majesty.
Relief of Sir John Mead Act 1706	6 Ann. c. 7 Pr. 5 Ann. c. 7 Pr.	6 March 1707
An Act for Relief of Sir John Mead, of the Kingdom of Ireland, Knight and Baronet.
Administration in England of Thomas Maule's oath of office as Remembrancer of the Court of Exchequer in Ireland.	6 Ann. c. 8 Pr. 5 Ann. c. 8 Pr.	6 March 1707
An Act for empowering the Barons of the Court of Exchequer in Ireland to grant a Commission to some Persons in England, to administer to Thomas Maule Esquire, Remembrancer of the said Court, the usual Oaths for the due Execution of his Office; and to enable him to take the Oaths, and subscribe the Declaration, in the Court of Chancery in England, instead of those requisite to be taken and subscribed by the Laws of England and Ireland, in order to qualify him to execute the said Office.
Earl of Thomond's Estate Act 1706	6 Ann. c. 9 Pr. 5 Ann. c. 9 Pr.	24 March 1707
An Act to enable the Right Honourable Henry Earl of Thomond, an Infant, to make a Settlement of his Estate upon his Marriage (notwithstanding his Infancy); and for other the Purposes in the said Act mentioned.
Bishop of Oxford's Estate Act 1706	6 Ann. c. 10 Pr. 5 Ann. c. 10 Pr.	24 March 1707
An Act for making more effectual a Settlement made by William Lord Bishop of Oxford, for the Benefit of his Children.
Dame Elizabeth Rich's Charity Estate Act 1706	6 Ann. c. 11 Pr. 5 Ann. c. 11 Pr.	24 March 1707
An Act for discharging several Lands in the County of Worcester from the Sum of Two Thousand Pounds, given by the Will of Dame Elizabeth Rich Widow, deceased, for Charitable Uses; and charging the same upon other Lands, in the County of Berks.
Canham's Estate Act 1706	6 Ann. c. 12 Pr. 5 Ann. c. 12 Pr.	24 March 1707
An Act for supplying the Defect of an Appointment for the Provision of the Younger Children of John Canham Esquire, deceased, pursuant to his Marriage Settlement; and for settling an Estate in Totteridge, in Lieu of Thirteen Hundred Pounds, the Remainder of a Sum of Money agreed to be laid out in a Purchase.
Darell's Estate Act 1706	6 Ann. c. 13 Pr. 5 Ann. c. 13 Pr.	24 March 1707
An Act for Sale of some Part of the Estate of Henry Darell Esquire, deceased; and leasing or mortgaging other Part thereof, to raise Money, to pay his Debts charged thereupon; and for making Provision for his Widow and Younger Children.
Fitch's Estate Act 1706	6 Ann. c. 14 Pr. 5 Ann. c. 14 Pr.	24 March 1707
An Act for vesting Part of the Estate of William Fitch Esquire, lying in the County of Dorset, in Trustees, to be sold, for the Payment of his Sister's Portion and other Debts; and for preserving the Residue free from all Power of Waste; and for settling certain Tithes in the Isle of Wighte to the same Uses.
Lee's Estate Act 1706	6 Ann. c. 15 Pr. 5 Ann. c. 15 Pr.	24 March 1707
An Act for the enabling Agnes Lee Widow to renew certain Leases for Lives, belonging to Richard Lee, her Son, who is an Infant.
Thomas' Estate Act 1706	6 Ann. c. 16 Pr. 5 Ann. c. 16 Pr.	24 March 1707
An Act for settling the Estate of Daniel Thomas Gentleman, for the Benefit of his Wife and Children.
Williams' Estate Act 1706	6 Ann. c. 17 Pr. 5 Ann. c. 17 Pr.	24 March 1707
An Act for Sale of certain Houses near Aldgate, in London, late the Estate of William Williams, deceased; and for purchasing Lands in Lieu thereof.
Empowering the Treasury to compound with Nathaniel Rich late Receiver General for the county of Essex.	6 Ann. c. 18 Pr. 5 Ann. c. 18 Pr.	24 March 1707
An Act to empower the Lord High Treasurer of England, or Commissioners of the Treasury, for the Time being, to compound with Nathaniel Rich Esquire, late Receiver General for the County of Essex.
Relief of John Baker and his family.	6 Ann. c. 19 Pr. 5 Ann. c. 19 Pr.	24 March 1707
An Act for the Relief of John Baker, his Mother, Brother, and Sisters, Widow and Children of Colonel Henry Baker deceased.
Freedom of Ship Prince Act 1706	6 Ann. c. 20 Pr. 5 Ann. c. 20 Pr.	24 March 1707
An Act for making the Ship Prince (Foreign-built) a free Ship.
Duke of Beaufort's Estate Act 1706	6 Ann. c. 21 Pr. 5 Ann. c. 21 Pr.	27 March 1707
An Act for discharging divers Manors and Lands of Henry Duke of Beaufort, from the Portions of his Daughters and Younger Children by his present Dutchess; and for charging other Manors and Lands of the said Duke, of greater Value, with the like Portions.
Henry Pye's Estate Act 1706	6 Ann. c. 22 Pr. 5 Ann. c. 22 Pr.	27 March 1707
An Act to enable Henry Pye Esquire to make a Jointure.
Pott's Estate Act 1706	6 Ann. c. 23 Pr. 5 Ann. c. 23 Pr.	27 March 1707
An Act for Sale of Part of the Estate of William Potts, for discharging his Brothers and Sisters Portions, and his Debts; and for confirming his Marriage Settlement, as to the Residue of his Estate, discharged of such Portions.
Vesting lands in Chelsea in the Queen for Chelsea College and vesting other lands in John Earl of Carbury.	6 Ann. c. 24 Pr. 5 Ann. c. 24 Pr.	8 April 1707
An Act for vesting Lands, in Chelsea, in the County of Middl'x, purchased of Charles Lord Cheyne, Viscount Newhaven in Scotland, in the Queen's Majesty, for the Accommodation of Chelsea Colledge; and other Lands in John Lord Vaughan, Earl of Carbury in Ireland, and his Heirs.
William Pierrepont's and Charles Egerton's Estate Act 1706	6 Ann. c. 25 Pr. 5 Ann. c. 25 Pr.	8 April 1707
An Act for confirming and establishing the Partitions made between Wiiliam Pierrepont Esquire, since deceased, and the Honourable Charles Egerton Esquire, and others, of several Manors and Lands, in the Counties of Suffolk, Kent, and Surrey; and to enable William and Samuel Pierrepont, Infants, to make Partition of Lands in other Counties, and to sell the same, and purchase other Lands, to be settled to the same Uses; and for rectifying a Mistake in the Marriage Settlement of William Peck Esquire.
Ratcliffe Culey (Leicestershire) Estate Act 1706	6 Ann. c. 26 Pr. 5 Ann. c. 26 Pr.	8 April 1707
An Act for vesting in Trustees a Messuage and Lands in Ratcliffe Culey, in the County of Leicester, to be sold, upon the settling of another Estate, of as great or greater Value, to the same Uses as the Lands to be sold are settled.
Alexander Pendarvis Relief Act 1706	6 Ann. c. 27 Pr. 5 Ann. c. 27 Pr.	8 April 1707
An Act for Relief of Alexander Pendarvis Esquire, in relation to Five Thousand Pounds, and Interest, provided for him out of Lands in Ireland.
Tettenhall (Staffordshire) Parish Act 1706	6 Ann. c. 28 Pr. 5 Ann. c. 28 Pr.	8 April 1707
An Act for the better Support and Maintenance of the Minister of Tettenhall, in the County of Stafford, for the Time being.
Eyre's Estate Act 1706	6 Ann. c. 29 Pr. 5 Ann. c. 29 Pr.	8 April 1707
An Act to vest certain Mills and Lands, in Downton, in the County of Wilts (the Estate of William Eyre a Lunatic), in Trustees, to be sold; and for applying Part of the Monies arising by the Sale thereof for Payment of the Debts of the said Lunatic, and making some Provision for Ambrose Eyre, his Eldest Son and Heir; and for applying the Residue of such Monies in purchasing of other Lands, to be settled to the same Uses as the said Premises to be sold are now settled.
Winwood's Estate Act 1706	6 Ann. c. 30 Pr. 5 Ann. c. 30 Pr.	8 April 1707
An Act to enable Trustees to sell several Lands, at Cole-greene, within the Manor of Herting fordbury, in the County of Hertford, and the Manor of the Rectory of Hertingfordbury aforesaid, late the Estate of Anne Winwood, deceased, for Payment of a Debt of Six Hundred Pounds, and Interest, due upon Mortgage, and Bond or Specialty; and for laying out the Residue of the Money arising by such Sale in the Purchase of other Lands or Tenements, to be settled to the same Uses as the said Lands are now settled.
Vanden Enden's Naturalization Act 1706	6 Ann. c. 31 Pr. 5 Ann. c. 31 Pr.	6 March 1707
An Act for naturalizing Philip Vanden Enden, Merchant.
Freedom of Ship Supply Act 1706	6 Ann. c. 32 Pr. 5 Ann. c. 32 Pr.	6 March 1707
An Act for making the Ship Supply a free Ship.
Hide's Estate Act 1706	6 Ann. c. 33 Pr. 5 Ann. c. 33 Pr.	8 April 1707
An Act for vesting a Mansion-house, and Lands thereunto adjoining, in the County of Middl'x, the Estate of William Hide Merchant, in Trustees, to be forthwith sold, for the better Maintenance and present Provision of his Children.
Hitch's Estate Act 1706	6 Ann. c. 34 Pr. 5 Ann. c. 34 Pr.	8 April 1707
An Act to vest several Lands and Hereditaments, in the County of York, in Robert Hitch Esquire and his Heirs; and to settle other Lands and Hereditaments, in the said County, in Lieu thereof, and as an Exchange thereof, to the same Uses.
Baines' Estate Act 1706	6 Ann. c. 35 Pr. 5 Ann. c. 35 Pr.	8 April 1707
An Act for rectifying a Mistake, and for supplying the Defects, in an Act of the Third Year of Her Majesty's Reign, (Note: Edward Baines' Estate Act 1704 (3 & 4 Ann. c. 27 Pr.)) for Sale of the Estate late of Edward Baines, for Discharge of a Mortgage thereupon; and for making Provision for his Daughters.
Charlton's Estate Act 1706	6 Ann. c. 36 Pr. 5 Ann. c. 36 Pr.	8 April 1707
An Act for Sale of the Estate, in the County of Montgomery, late Part of the Estate of Gilbert Charlton Esquire, deceased; and for purchasing other Estate, or Estates, in the Counties of Nottingham, Leicester, or Lincolne, to be settled to the like Uses as the Estate in the County of Montgomery was settled.
King's Estate Act 1706	6 Ann. c. 37 Pr. 5 Ann. c. 37 Pr.	8 April 1707
An Act for Sale of certain Lands contained in the Marriage Settlement of Daniel King and Jane his Wife; and for purchasing other Lands, of the same or greater Value, to be settled to the same Uses; also for giving Liberty to Jane Nicoll Widow and the Executors of Sir William Prichard to pay Two Sums, of Four Thousand Pounds and Two Thousand Pounds, mentioned in the said Settlement, in the Life-time of the said Jane Nicoll.
Weedon's Estate Act 1706	6 Ann. c. 38 Pr. 5 Ann. c. 38 Pr.	8 April 1707
An Act for Sale of Part of the Estate of John Weedon, of Souldern, in the County of Oxon, Esquire, for Payment of his Father's Debts and Legacies, and Portions to his Younger Children; and for settling the rest of his Estate to the Uses of his Father's voluntary Settlement.
Clark's Estate Act 1706	6 Ann. c. 39 Pr. 5 Ann. c. 39 Pr.	8 April 1707
An Act to enable Thomas Clarke, an Infant, to make a Lease of a House in St. Mary Axe, in London, to Sir Jeffrey Jeffreys Knight.
Humberston Parish Act 1706	6 Ann. c. 40 Pr. 5 Ann. c. 40 Pr.	8 April 1707
An Act for encouraging the re-building the ancient Parish Church of Humberston, in the County of Lincolne; and settling a Rent-charge, of greater Value, on the Bishop of Lincolne and his Successors, in Lieu of the Rectory of Humberston; and for other Purposes therein mentioned.
Drake's Estate Act 1706	6 Ann. c. 41 Pr. 5 Ann. c. 41 Pr.	8 April 1707
An Act for vesting the Reversion in Fee of certain Manors and Lands, in the County of Kent, late the Estate of Mountague Drake Esquire, deceased, in Trustees, to be sold, for Payment of his Debts and Legacies.
John Aynsworth's Estate Act 1706	6 Ann. c. 42 Pr. 5 Ann. c. 42 Pr.	8 April 1707
An Act for the better Discovery of the Estate of John Aynsworth, late of London, Merchant.
John Crosse's Debt Act 1706	6 Ann. c. 43 Pr. 5 Ann. c. 43 Pr.	8 April 1707
An Act to enable the Lord High Treasurer, or Commissioners of the Treasury, for the Time being, to compound with John Crosse Merchant, and his Sureties, for the Debt owing by him to Her Majesty.
Elson's Estate Act 1706	6 Ann. c. 44 Pr. 5 Ann. c. 44 Pr.	8 April 1707
An Act to enable the Trustees of William Elson, an Infant, to sell Part of his Estate, for Payment of his Father's Debts on Specialties.
John Pye's Debt Act 1706	6 Ann. c. 45 Pr. 5 Ann. c. 45 Pr.	8 April 1707
An Act to enable the Lord Treasurer, or Commissioners of the Treasury, for the Time being, to compound with John Pye Gentleman, and his Sureties, for the Debt by him and them owing to Her Majesty.
Relief of Elizabeth Wandesford and Elizabeth Foulk Act 1706	6 Ann. c. 46 Pr. 5 Ann. c. 46 Pr.	8 April 1707
An Act for Relief of Elizabeth Wandesford and Elizabeth Foulke.
Naturalizing John Thomeur and Others Act 1706	6 Ann. c. 47 Pr. 5 Ann. c. 47 Pr.	8 April 1707
An Act for naturalizing John Thomeur and others.
Naturalizing Henry Van Holte and Others Act 1706	6 Ann. c. 48 Pr. 5 Ann. c. 48 Pr.	8 April 1707
An Act to naturalize Henry Von-Holte and others.

=== Sources ===
- Raithby, John, ed. (1963) [1821]. "6° Annæ". Statutes of the Realm. Vol. 8: The Statutes of the First to the Sixth Years of the Reign of Queen Anne (1702–1707). London: Dawsons. pp. 519–636 – via HathiTrust.
- Pickering, Danby, ed. (1764). "Anno quinto Annæ". The Statutes at Large. Vol. 11: From the Second to the Eighth Year of Queen Anne. Cambridge: Joseph Bentham. pp. 180–290 – via Internet Archive.
- Pickering, Danby, ed. (1764). "Anno quinto Annæ". The Statutes at Large. Vol. 11: From the Second to the Eighth Year of Queen Anne. Cambridge: Joseph Bentham. pp. 180–290 – via Internet Archive.
- Journals of the House of Commons. Vol. 15. London: His Majesty's Stationery Office. 1803. pp. 200–385 – via Google Books.
- Chronological Table of and Index to the Statutes. Vol. 1: To the End of the Session 59 Vict. Sess. 2 (1895) (13th ed.). London: Her Majesty's Stationery Office. 1896. pp. 85–86 – via Google Books.
- Chronological Table of the Statutes: Covering the Period from 1235 to the End of 1971. London: Her Majesty's Stationery Office. 1972. pp. 82–83. ISBN 978-0-11-840096-1 – via Google Books.
- "Acts of the English Parliament from 1706". legislation.gov.uk. The National Archives.
- "Chronological Tables of the Private and Personal Acts: Part 7 (1706–1713)". legislation.gov.uk. The National Archives.

== See also ==
- List of acts of the Parliament of England
