= Monmouth Rebellion =

1685 English rebellion against James II

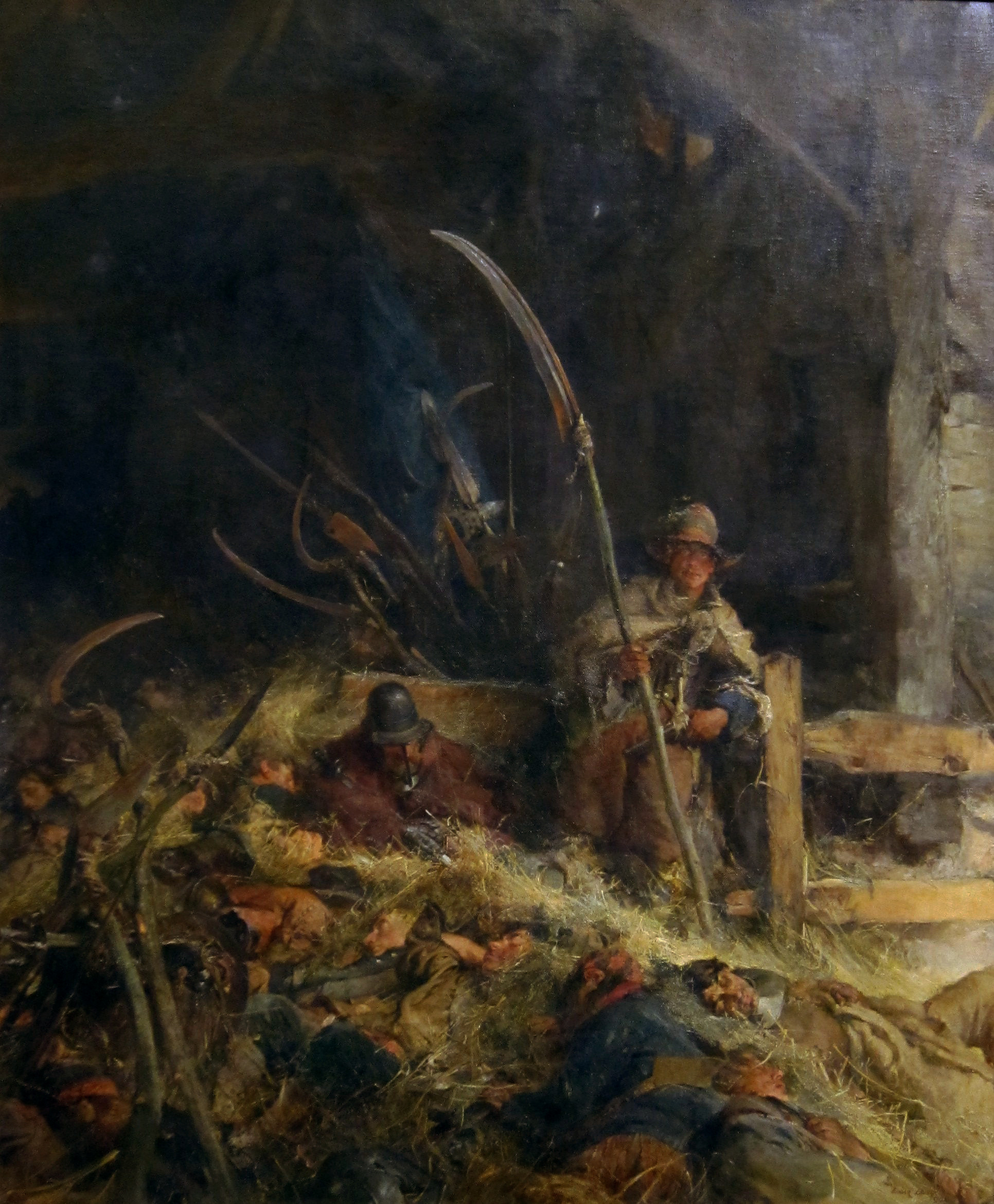
- The Morning of Sedgemoor, by Edgar Bundy
| Date | June – July 1685 |
| Location | South West England |
| Result | Government victory |

Belligerents
| England | Monmouth Rebels |

Commanders and leaders
| Earl of Feversham; John Churchill; Duke of Grafton; Duke of Ablemarle; Duke of Somerset | Duke of Monmouth (executed); Baron Grey of Werke; Robert Ferguson; Nathaniel Wade; Andrew Fletcher |

Strength
| 3,000 | 4,000 |

Casualties and losses
| 200 killed and wounded | 1,300 killed and wounded 2,700 captured (Note: Estimated 320 of these were executed, 750 transported) |

The Monmouth Rebellion (also known as the Pitchfork Rebellion, Revolt of the West or West Country rebellion) in June 1685 was an attempt to depose James II, who in February had succeeded his brother Charles II as king of England, Scotland and Ireland. Dissident Protestants led by James Scott, 1st Duke of Monmouth, eldest illegitimate son of Charles II, opposed James largely due to his Catholicism.

The failure of Parliamentary efforts to exclude James from the succession in 1681 resulted in the 1683 Rye House Plot, an alleged attempt to assassinate Charles II and James. Monmouth, implicated as a co-conspirator, went into exile in the Dutch Republic. He returned to England when on 11 June 1685, he landed at Lyme Regis in the South West where he had widespread popular support, planning to take control of the area and march on London.

The rebellion coincided roughly with Argyll's Rising in Scotland, an ill-organised failure intended to take place at the same time. Over the next few weeks, Monmouth's army skirmished with troops commanded by Louis de Duras, 2nd Earl of Feversham, and John Churchill. However, he failed to attract wider backing and was defeated at the Battle of Sedgemoor on 6 July 1685.

Monmouth was captured and beheaded for treason on 15 July 1685, while around 1,000 of his supporters were executed or transported in what became known as the Bloody Assizes. James II reigned until 1688, when he was deposed by another nephew, William III of Orange, in the Glorious Revolution.

== Duke of Monmouth ==
Standard of the troops loyal to the Duke of Monmouth.

Monmouth was an illegitimate son of Charles II. There had been rumours that Charles had married Monmouth's mother, Lucy Walter, but no evidence was forthcoming, and Charles always said that he only had one wife, Catherine of Braganza.

Monmouth had been appointed Commander-in-Chief of the English Army by his father in 1672 and Captain general in 1678, enjoying some successes in the Netherlands in the Third Anglo-Dutch War, as commander of a British brigade in the French army.

== Context ==
The English Civil War had left resentment among some of the population about the monarchy and the penalties which had been imposed on the supporters of the Commonwealth. The South West of England contained several towns where opposition remained strong. Fears of a potential Catholic monarch persisted, intensified by the failure of Charles II and his wife to produce any children. A defrocked Anglican clergyman, Titus Oates, spoke of a "Popish Plot" to kill Charles and to put the Duke of York on the throne. The Earl of Shaftesbury, a former government minister and a leading opponent of Catholicism, attempted to have James excluded from the line of succession. Some members of Parliament even proposed that the crown go to Charles's illegitimate son, James Scott, who became the Duke of Monmouth. In 1679, with the Exclusion Bill – which would exclude the King's brother and heir presumptive, James, Duke of York, from the line of succession – in danger of passing, Charles II dissolved Parliament. Two further Parliaments were elected in 1680 and 1681, but were dissolved for the same reason.

After the Rye House Plot of 1683, an attempt to assassinate both Charles and James, Monmouth went into self-imposed exile in the Netherlands, and gathered supporters in The Hague. Monmouth was a Protestant and had toured the South West of England in 1680, where he had been greeted amicably by crowds in towns such as Chard and Taunton. So long as Charles II remained on the throne, Monmouth was content to live a life of pleasure in Holland, while still hoping to accede peaceably to the throne. The accession of James II and coronation at Westminster Abbey on 23 April 1685 put an end to these hopes.

== Plan ==
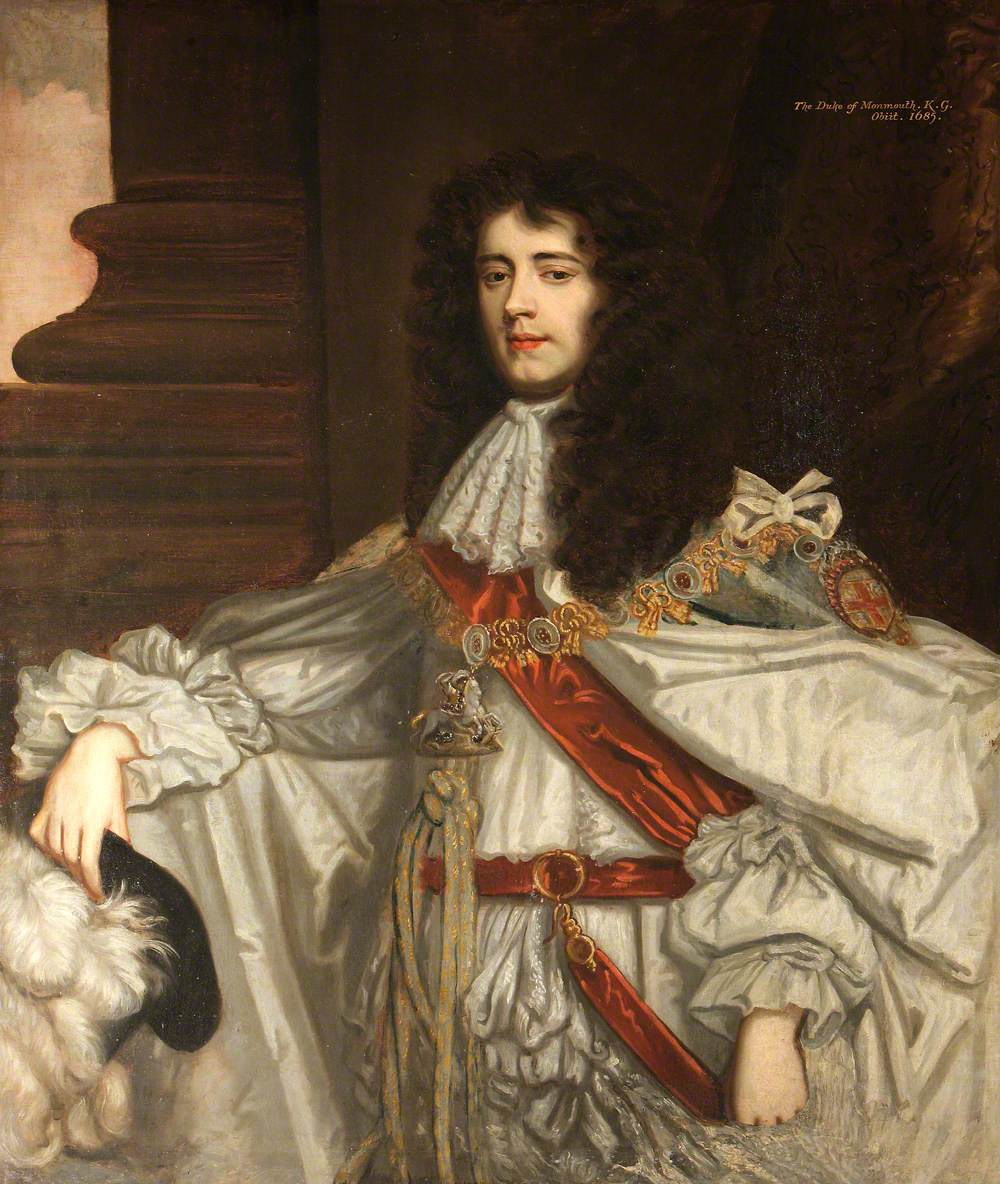
Portrait of the Duke of Monmouth made five years before the rebellion

The Monmouth rebellion was planned in Holland and coordinated with another rebellion in Scotland led by Archibald Campbell, the Earl of Argyll. Several areas of England were considered as potential locations for rebellion, including Cheshire and Lancashire along with the South West, as these were seen as having the highest number of opponents of the monarchy. Argyll and Monmouth both began their expeditions from Holland, where James's nephew and son-in-law, stadtholder William III of Orange, had not detained them or put a stop to their recruitment efforts. Argyll sailed to Scotland and, on arriving there, raised recruits mainly from his own clan, the Campbells, as part of the Scottish revolt. He had previously been involved in the Rye House Plot of 1683.

Another important member of the rebellion was Robert Ferguson, a radical Scottish Presbyterian minister. He was also known as "the plotter". It was Ferguson who drew up Monmouth's proclamation, and he who was most in favour of Monmouth being crowned King. Thomas Hayward Dare was a goldsmith from Taunton and a Whig politician, a man of considerable wealth and influence who had been jailed during a political campaign calling for a new parliament. He was also fined the huge sum of £5,000 for uttering "seditious" words. After his release from jail, he fled to Holland and became the paymaster general to the Rebellion.

To raise the funds for ships and weaponry, Monmouth pawned many of his belongings. His wife Anne Scott, 1st Duchess of Buccleuch, and her mother also pawned their jewellery to hire the Dutch warship Helderenberg. Ann Smith, wealthy widow of a London sugar-baker, gave him £1,000.

== From Lyme Regis to Sedgemoor ==
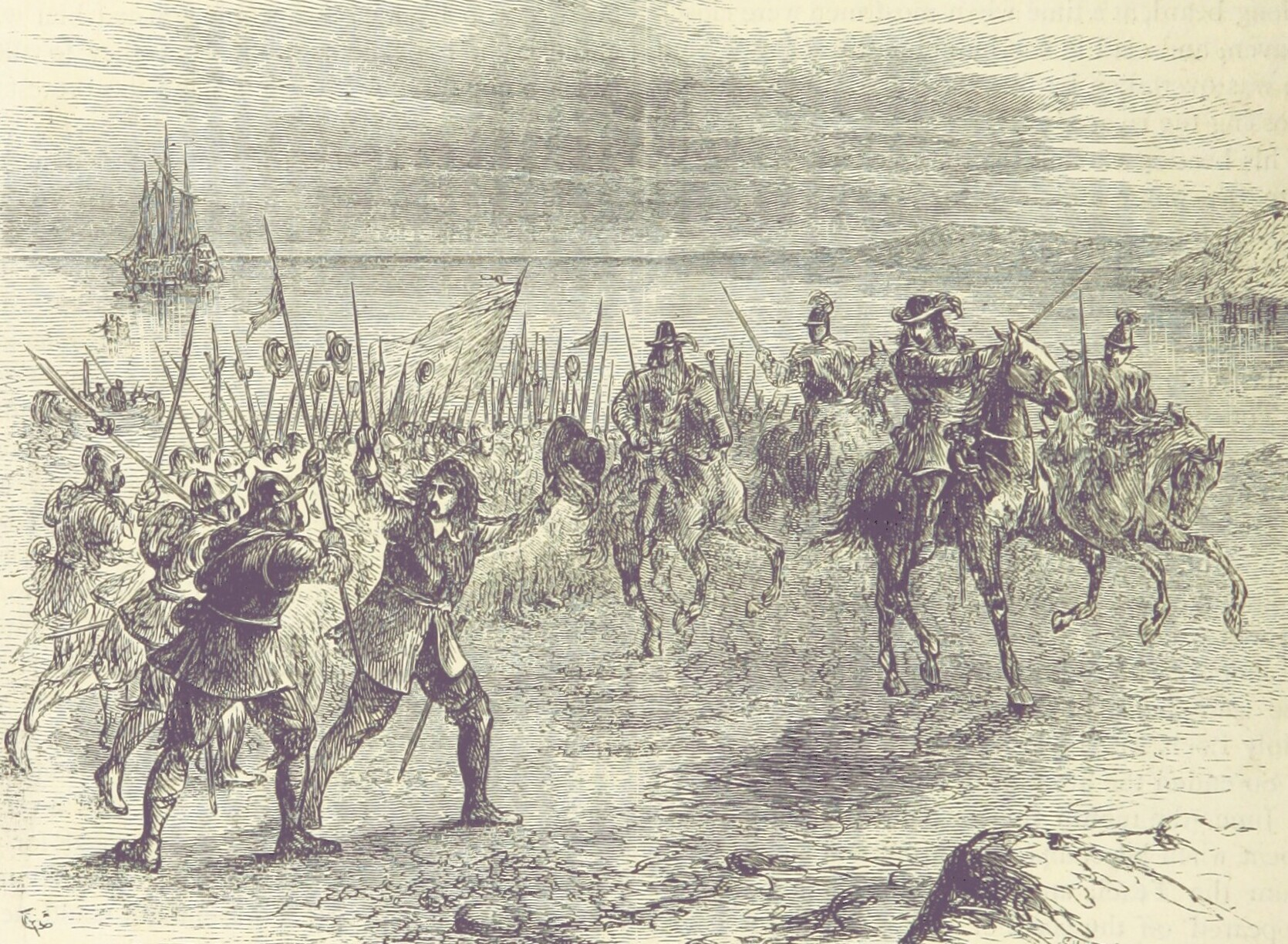
Monmouth landing at Lyme Regis

On 30 May 1685 Monmouth set sail for South West England, a strongly Protestant region, with three small ships, four light field guns, and 1500 muskets. He landed on 11 June with 82 supporters, including Lord Grey of Warke, Nathaniel Wade, and Andrew Fletcher of Saltoun. They gathered about 300 men on the first day at Lyme Regis in Dorset, where a long statement prepared by Ferguson denounced the king.

King James had previously received intelligence about the impending plot, and the ships leaving Holland, ten days before. He was warned of Monmouth's arrival soon after the first landing. The mayor of the town, Gregory Alford, informed the local militia regiments while Samuel Damsell and another customs officer rode from Lyme to London, arriving on 13 June, having ridden 200 miles (322 km). To face Monmouth's rebels, John Churchill was given command of the regular foot in the King's army, and the honour of leading the campaign passed to the Huguenot Earl of Feversham. It would take a few days to assemble the army and travel from London to the west country, therefore initial defence was left to local militias.

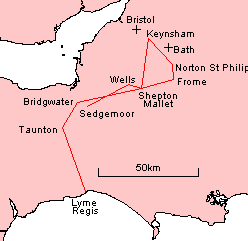
Route of Monmouth's army

Over the next couple of days volunteers arrived in Lyme offering to serve under Monmouth. By 15 June he had a force in excess of 1,000 men. On 13 June he lost two of his leading supporters when Dare and Fletcher disputed who should ride one of the best horses provided by local supporters. Fletcher shot and killed Dare and was then put under arrest and sent back to the frigate Helderenberg. The next day, 40 cavalry and 400 foot soldiers, under the command of Lord Grey and Wade, moved on to the nearby town of Bridport, where they encountered 1,200 men from the local royalist Dorset militia. The skirmish ended in a Royalist victory, with the retreat of Grey and the cavalry followed by Wade with the foot soldiers. Many of the militiamen deserted and joined Monmouth's army. Following this confrontation, Lord Albemarle led a royalist force from Exeter towards the forces of the Duke of Somerset, who were approaching Lyme Regis from the opposite direction.

Monmouth learned of the approach of royalist reinforcements and departed, but instead of marching to London, he headed north with his force towards the county of Somerset. On 15 June he fought with the militia at Axminster, taking the town before the militias could join up. More recruits joined his disorganised force, which was now around 6,000, consisting mostly of nonconformists, artisans, and farm workers armed with farm tools (such as pitchforks). One famous supporter was the young Daniel Defoe.

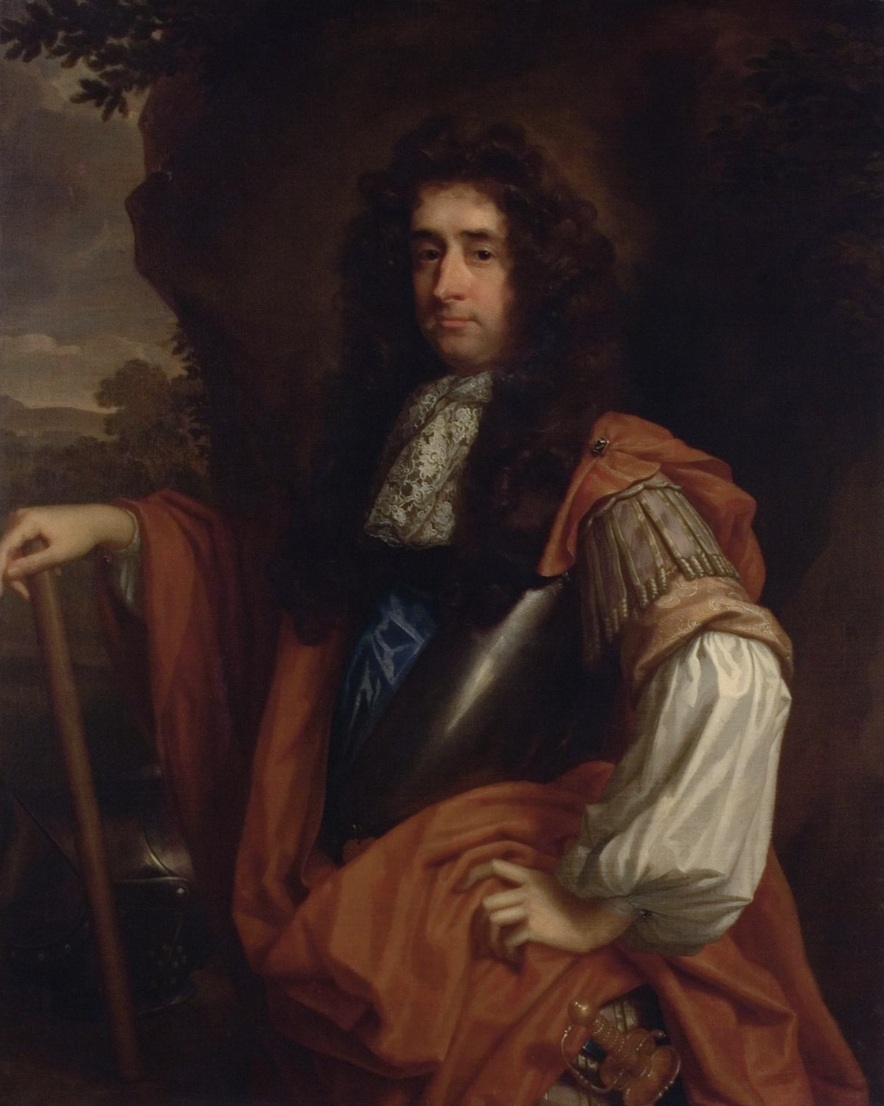
Louis de Duras, 2nd Earl of Feversham

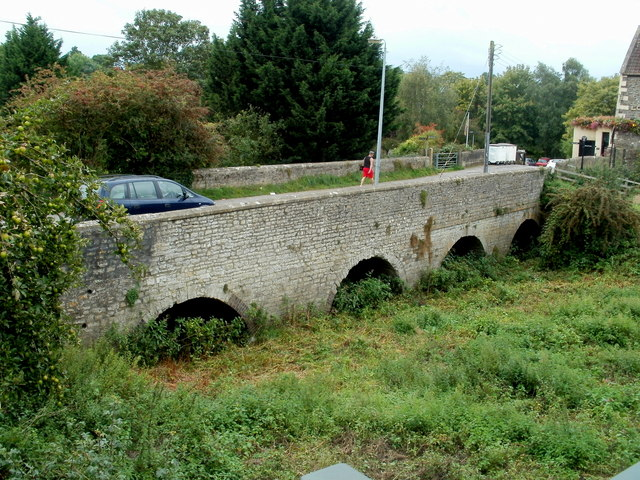
The old Keynsham bridge seen in 2011. The course of the river has been diverted

Monmouth again denounced the king in Chard and was the subject of a coronation in Taunton on 20 June 1685, against the wishes of some of his republican supporters such as Wade. The Taunton Corporation was forced to witness the event at sword point outside the White Hart Inn, to encourage the support of the country gentry. In Taunton, Monmouth was joined by many new supporters and formed a new regiment of 800 men. The king's force of Dragoons under Churchill continued to close on Monmouth, arriving in Chard on 19 June. With the assistance of the local militias they attempted to stop new recruits arriving in Taunton to join Monmouth. Feversham meanwhile moved with his forces into Bristol, on the assumption that this would be Monmouth's next target, and took overall charge of the campaign.

Monmouth and his growing force then continued north to Bridgwater, where he took up residence at Bridgwater Castle on 21 June, Glastonbury (22 June) and on to Shepton Mallet, arriving on 23 June in worsening weather. Meanwhile, the Royal Navy captured Monmouth's ships, cutting off any hope of an escape back to the continent. The Royalist forces of Churchill, who was now in Chard, and of Feversham, in Bristol, also received reinforcements who had marched from London.

On 24 June, Monmouth's army encamped at Pensford, and a small force skirmished with the Gloucester Militia to take control of Keynsham, a vital crossing point over the River Avon. He made Keynsham Abbey his headquarters there. Monmouth intended to attack the city of Bristol, after London the largest and most important city in England at that time, However, he heard the city had been occupied by Henry Somerset, 1st Duke of Beaufort. There were inconclusive skirmishes with a force of Life Guards commanded by Feversham. These attacks gave the impression that there was a much larger royalist force in the vicinity than there actually was. Several historians have speculated that if Monmouth had marched as quickly as possible for Bristol at this point, when it was only protected by the Gloucestershire Militia, he would probably have been able to take the city and the outcome of the rebellion might have been very different. Once Bristol had been taken, more recruits would have been attracted to the Rebellion and a later march on London would have been possible.

On 26 June, Monmouth moved towards Bath and, arriving on the south side of it, found it had also been occupied by royalist troops. He camped for the night in Philips Norton (now Norton St Philip), where his forces were attacked on the morning of 27 June by the leading elements of Feversham's forces, which had now combined into a larger force, but were still awaiting their artillery. Monmouth's half-brother Henry FitzRoy, 1st Duke of Grafton, led some royalist cavalry, dragoons, and 500 musketeers into the village, where they were surrounded by the rebels and had to hack through hedges to escape. They were rescued by Churchill and withdrew with approximately twenty casualties on each side; however, each side believed that the other had taken greater losses.

Monmouth then marched overnight to Frome, arriving on 28 June. The morale of Monmouth's forces started to collapse as news of the failure of the rebellion in Scotland arrived that day, while the makeshift army was camped in Frome. Argyll's small force had been involved in minor skirmishes at Greenock and Ellangreig. He took Ardkinglass castle, but after disagreements with key supporters about when and where to fight the royalists commanded by Rosse and William Cleland, his supporters dwindled away and the Scottish rebellion failed.

The rebels planned to go next to Warminster, where there were many nonconformist wool workers, but on 27 June the Wiltshire Militia had marched from Bath to Trowbridge, and on 29 June entered Westbury. Hearing that an army supporting him had gathered near Bridgwater, Monmouth turned back through Shepton Mallet and arrived in Wells on 1 July. His men damaged the Bishop's Palace and the west front of Wells Cathedral, tearing lead from the roof to make bullets, breaking the windows, smashing the organ and the furnishings, and for a time stabling their horses in the nave.

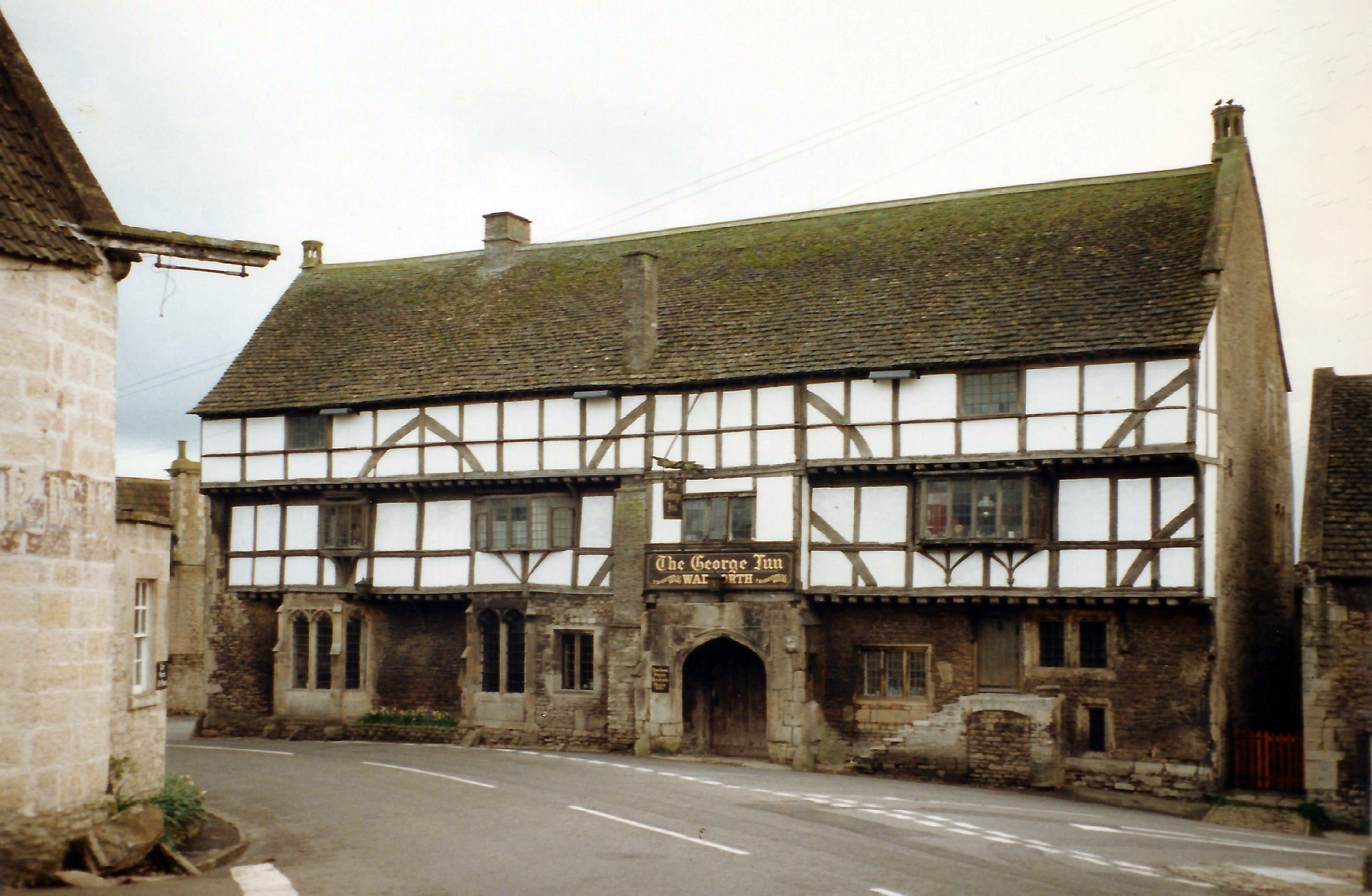
The George Inn at Norton St Philip

Feversham aimed to contain the rebels in the South West until the rest of his forces, including three battalions of British mercenaries sent by William III of Orange from Holland, arrived. In the light of propaganda suggesting the rebels had an army of 40,000 and that 500 royalist troops had been lost at Norton St Philip, Feversham was ordered to engage Monmouth's forces. On 30 June the final parts of Feversham's army, including his artillery, arrived and eventually Monmouth was pushed back via Shepton Mallet to the Somerset Levels, where Alfred the Great had found refuge in his conflicts with the Vikings. Becoming hemmed in at Bridgwater on 3 July, he ordered his troops to fortify the town.

== Battle of Sedgemoor ==
Monmouth was defeated at the Battle of Sedgemoor by forces under the direction of John Churchill (Lord Feversham, the commander, having spent the night of the battle at a nearby inn) on 6 July.

Once Monmouth's force had entered and started to fortify Bridgwater, he sent some of his cavalry to collect six cannon from Minehead. He planned to stay in Bridgwater until they returned and then break out and head for Bristol. Feversham and his army of 500 horse and 1,500 militiamen camped on the edge of Sedgemoor at the village of Westonzoyland. Monmouth could view them from the tower of Church of St Mary and may have inspected them more closely from the Church of St Mary in Chedzoy, before deciding to attack them.

The Duke eventually led his untrained and ill-equipped troops out of Bridgwater at around 10:00 pm to undertake a night-time attack on the King's army. They were guided by Richard Godfrey, the servant of a local farmer, along the old Bristol road towards Bawdrip. With their limited cavalry in the vanguard, they turned south along Bradney Lane and Marsh Lane and came to the open moor with its deep and dangerous rhynes (drainage ditches).

There was a delay while the rhyne was crossed and the first men across startled a royalist patrol. A shot was fired and a horseman from the patrol galloped off to report to Feversham. Lord Grey of Warke led the rebel cavalry forward and they were engaged by the King's Regiment of Horse which alerted the rest of the royalist forces. The superior training of the regular army and their horses routed the rebel forces by outflanking them. His untrained supporters were quickly defeated by the professionals, and hundreds were cut down by cannon- and musket-fire.

The death count on the rebel side has variously been given as between 727 and 2,700, with royalist losses of 27 who were buried in the churchyard of the Church of St Mary the Virgin in Westonzoyland, which was used as a prison for rebel soldiers.

== After Sedgemoor ==
Monmouth fled from the field of battle, but was captured in a ditch on 8 July (either at Ringwood in the New Forest, or at Horton in Dorset). Parliament had passed an Act of Attainder, on 13 June sentencing Monmouth to death as a traitor, therefore no trial was needed before his execution. Despite begging for mercy and claims of conversion to Roman Catholicism, he was beheaded at Tower Hill by Jack Ketch on 15 July 1685. It is said that it took multiple blows of the axe to sever his head. Though some sources say it took eight blows, the official Tower of London website says it took five blows, while Charles Spencer, in his book Blenheim, claims it was seven. His dukedoms of Monmouth and Buccleuch were forfeited, though his wife's separate dukedom of Buccleuch in her own right was not, and two of his subsidiary titles were restored in 1743 to his grandson the then Duke of Buccleuch.

The subsequent Bloody Assizes of Judge Jeffreys were a series of trials of Monmouth's supporters in which 320 people were condemned to death and around 800 sentenced to be transported to the West Indies, for ten years' hard labour.

James II took advantage of the suppression of the rebellion to consolidate his power. He asked Parliament to repeal the Test Act and the Habeas Corpus Act, used his dispensing power to appoint Roman Catholics to senior posts, and raised the strength of the standing army. Parliament opposed many of these moves, and on 20 November 1685 James dismissed it. In 1688, when the birth of James Francis Edward Stuart heralded a Catholic succession, James II was deposed by William of Orange in the Glorious Revolution at the invitation of the disaffected Protestant establishment.

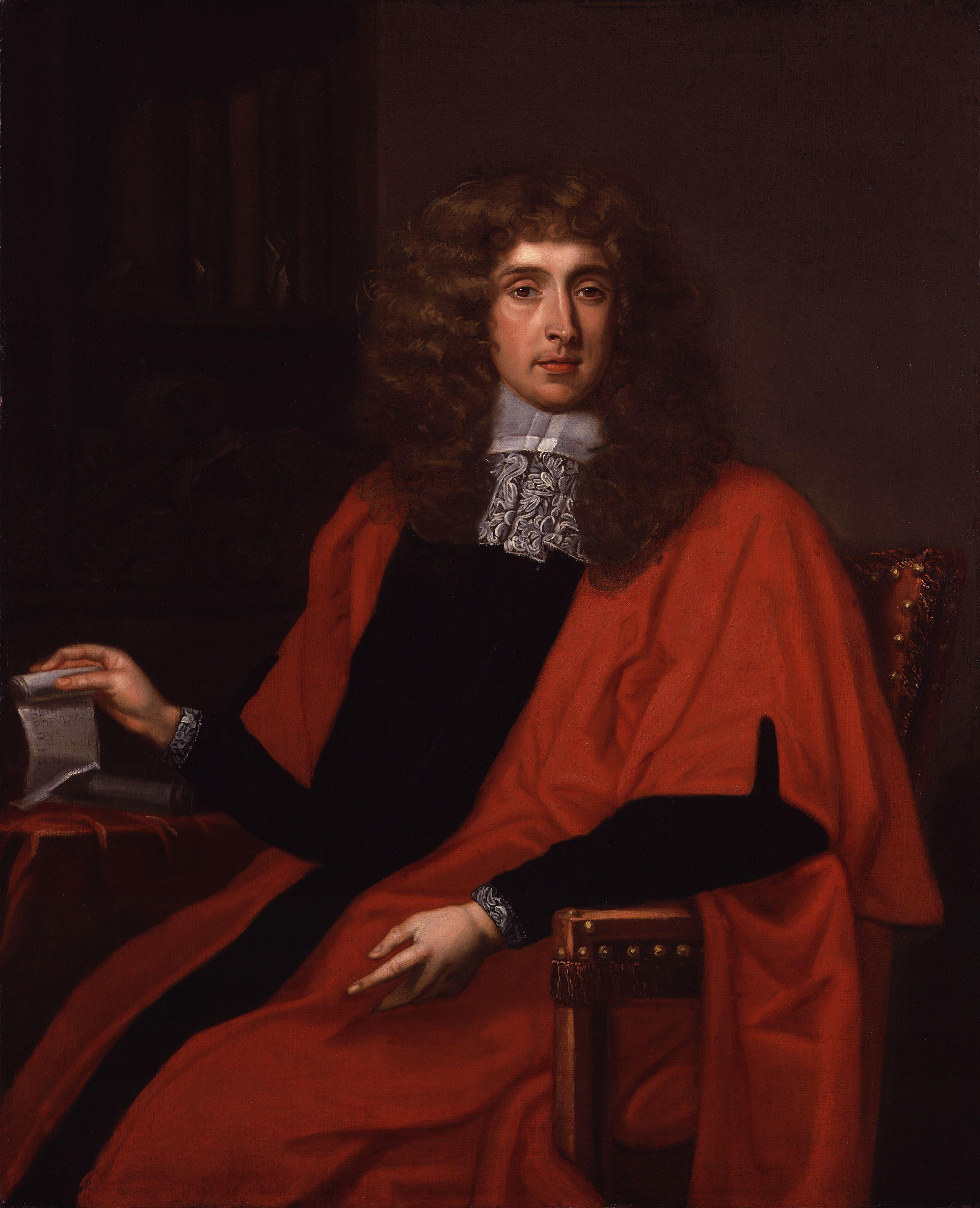
Judge Jeffreys

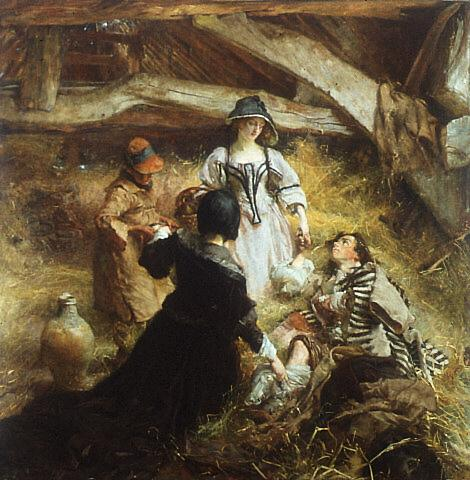
A wounded supporter of Monmouth taking refuge in a hay barn after the battle by Edgar Bundy

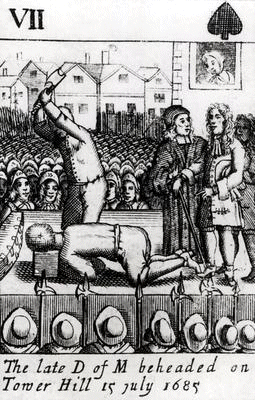
Monmouth's execution on Tower Hill, 15 July 1685 (O.S).

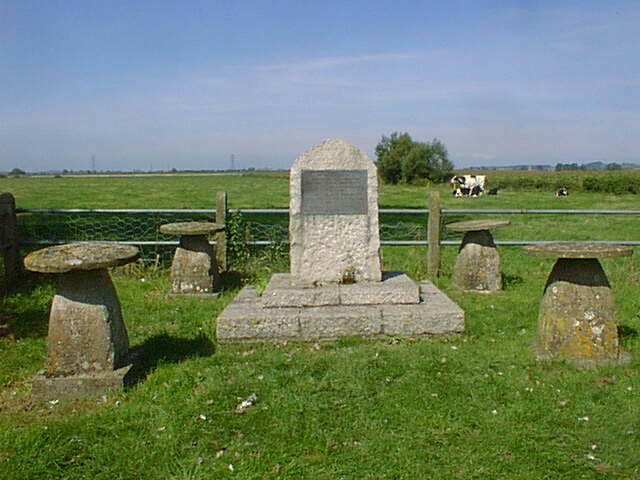
Battle of Sedgemoor memorial

== Literary references ==
The Monmouth Rebellion and the events surrounding it have formed the basis for several works of fiction:

- The Monmouth Rebellion plays a key role in Peter S. Beagle's novel Tamsin, about a 300-year-old ghost who is befriended by the protagonist.
- Another novel, of 1889, covering the events of the Rebellion was Sir Walter Besant's For Faith and Freedom.
- In R. D. Blackmore's novel Lorna Doone, the hero John Ridd rescues his brother-in-law Tom Faggus from the battlefield of Sedgemoor, but is captured as a rebel, and brought before Judge Jefferies.
- Arthur Conan Doyle's historical novel Micah Clarke deals directly with Monmouth's landing in England, the raising of his army, its defeat at Sedgemoor, and the reprisals which followed.
- John Dryden's poem Absalom and Achitophel is a satire partially concerned with equating biblical events with the Monmouth Rebellion.
- "The Duke's Reappearance—A Family Tradition" is a short story by Thomas Hardy, in which Monmouth has fled the battle at Sedgemoor and turns up at a lonely manor-house, where he is given food and shelter.
- John Masefield's 1910 novel Martin Hyde: The Duke's Messenger tells the story of a boy who plays a central part in the Monmouth Rebellion, from the meeting with Argyll in Holland to the failed rebellion itself.
- The aftermath of the Rebellion is the setting for A. E. W. Mason's 1896 novel The Courtship of Morrice Buckler.
- The events immediately before and after the Battle of Sedgemoor, and leading up to James II's exile following The Glorious Revolution provide the setting for Robert Neill's historical novel Lilliburlero.
- Dr. Peter Blood, main hero of Rafael Sabatini's 1922 novel Captain Blood, was sentenced by Judge Jeffreys for aiding wounded Monmouth rebels. Transported to the Caribbean, he started his career as a pirate there.
- Another of Sabatini's novels, Mistress Wilding, also takes place during this time, as the hero, Anthony Wilding, is a supporter of Monmouth.
- Several characters in Neal Stephenson's trilogy The Baroque Cycle, particularly Quicksilver and The Confusion, play a role in the Monmouth Rebellion and its aftermath.
- The Royal Changeling, (1998), by John Whitbourn, describes the rebellion with some fantasy elements added, from the viewpoint of Sir Theophilus Oglethorpe.
- The 1972 television programme Pretenders is set against the backdrop of the Monmouth Rebellion, and features an alleged son of the Duke of Monmouth.
- The book “In Taunton Town” written by E. Everett-Green and published in 1896 is a novel based on the Duke of Monmouth’s Rebellion. Written in a version of English presumably common at the time, it is the fictional story of Dicon (a local boy), his part in the rebellion and his help to the son (Viscount) of a local Lord (Lonsdale). The Viscount being a supporter of James, Duke of Monmouth, whilst his father (the Lord) does not. Set as its name suggests in around the town of Taunton and including adventures in other significant South West towns of England (Ilminster, Bridgewater), the story also describes the relationship between the Viscount and his young “love” and how he helps this “love” survive. With lots of references to real characters from the Rebellion including the notorious Judge Jefferies it very well worth a read.

== Bibliography ==
- Bevan, Bryan (1973). James, Duke of Monmouth. London: Robert Hale. ISBN 978-0-7091-3985-0.
- Chenevix Trench, Charles (1969). The Western Rising. Longmans. ISBN 978-0582108004.
- Clarke, Nigel J. (1985). Monmouth's West Country Rebellion of 1685. Nigel J Clarke Publications. ISBN 978-0-907683-17-9.
- Clifton, Robin (2004). "Walter, Lucy (1630?–1658)". Oxford Dictionary of National Biography. Oxford University Press. ISBN 978-0-19-861411-1.
- Dunning, Robert (1984). The Monmouth Rebellion: A Guide to the Rebellion and Bloody Assizes. Wimborne, Dorset, UK: Dovecote Press. ISBN 978-0-946159-23-9.
- Earle, Peter (1977). Monmouth's Rebels: The Road to Sedgemoor 1685. London: Weidenfeld & Nicolson. ISBN 978-0-297-77384-9.
- Ferguson, James (2008). Robert Ferguson, "The Plotter". Wildside Press. ISBN 978-1-4344-7131-4.
- Fraser, Antonia (1979). King Charles II. London: Weidenfeld and Nicolson. ISBN 978-0-297-77571-3.
- Harris, Tim (2006). Revolution: The Great Crisis of the British Monarchy, 1685–1720. Penguin Books. ISBN 978-0-7139-9759-0.
- Miller, John (2000). James II (3rd ed.). New Haven: Yale University Press. ISBN 978-0-300-08728-4.
- Roots, Ivan (1986). The Monmouth Rising. Devon Books. ISBN 978-0-86114-779-3.
- Sawers, Geoff (2007). The Monmouth Rebellion and the Bloody Assizes. Reading, UK: Two Rivers Press. ISBN 978-1-901677-49-2.
- Scott, Sibbald (1880). The British Army: Its Origin, Progress, and Equipment. Vol. III: From the Restoration to the Revolution. Cassell. OCLC 57650058. At HahthiTrust: Volume=III: From the Restoration to the Revolution.
- Smith, Hannah (2021). Armies and Political Change in Britain, 1660-1750. Oxford University Press. ISBN 9780198851998.
- Spencer, Charles (2004). Blenheim. Weidenfeld & Nicolson. ISBN 978-0-297-84609-3.
- Tincey, John (2005). Sedgemoor 1685: Marlborough's First Victory. Barnsley, South Yorks, UK: Pen and Sword Books. ISBN 978-1-84415-147-9.
- Webb, Stephen Saunders (1995). Lord Churchill's Coup: The Anglo-American Empire and the Glorious Revolution Reconsidered (1998 eBook ed.). Syracuse, N.Y.: Syracuse University Press. ISBN 0-8156-0558-7.
- Whiles, John (1985). Sedgemoor 1685 (2nd ed.). Chippenham: Picton Publishing. ISBN 978-0-948251-00-9.
- Wyndham, Violet (1976). Protestant Duke: Life of the Duke of Monmouth. London: Weidenfeld & Nicolson. ISBN 978-0-297-77099-2.
