= The Courtship of Morrice Buckler =

1896 novel by A. E. W. Mason

- 1896 copy
- Author: A.E.W. Mason
- Language: English
- Genre: Historical romance, adventure
- Set in: England, Tyrol
- Publisher: Macmillan & Co
- Publication date: 1896
- Media type: Print
- Pages: 373

The Courtship of Morrice Buckler is an 1896 novel by the English author AEW Mason. It bears the subtitle A Romance : Being a Record of the Growth of an English Gentleman during the years 1685–1687, under strange and difficult circumstances / written some while afterwards in his own hand, and now edited by / A.E.W. Mason.

The novel was Mason's second and, according to a 1923 review, instantly established the author as an extraordinarily popular novelist.

== Plot ==
In a framing narrative, the narrator, Morrice Buckler, recalls an eventful period of his life, twenty years earlier. That time had been followed by quiet years of happiness; but now those years, too, are past and Morrice resolves to occupy his current days of loneliness by setting down his memories.

The action commences in the Dutch city of Leyden in 1685 where Morrice, a wealthy English law student, is studying with fellow student Jack Larke. A servant bursts in, carrying a message from Morrice's friend in England, Sir Julian Harnwood. Sir Julian lies in Bristol gaol, having been arrested for treasonously harbouring rebels in the aftermath of Monmouth's failed 1685 rebellion, and he faces trial at the assizes before the infamous Judge Jeffries in a week's time. Morrice leaves immediately for England, but arrives too late: Sir Julian's trial has already taken place and he has been sentenced to hang.

Morrice is smuggled into Sir Julian's cell the night before the execution, and is asked by his friend to settle a debt of honour on his behalf. Sir Julian and a rival, Count Lukstein, had been lovers of the same woman, Miss Marston, and Sir Julian had been arrested on his way to fight a duel. Having learned of the rebels from Miss Marston, Lukstein had treacherously informed on him to the authorities. Sir Julian tells Morrice's how to gain access to Lukstein's castle in the Tyrol.

Morrice travels to Castle Lukstein with Jack Larke. Leaving Jack in the woods, he scales the cliff surrounding the castle and creeps in from the snow-covered terrace. Lukstein, who has that very day been married, is found alone in a downstairs tower room. Morrice forces Luckstein to fight, and runs him through. As Lukstein lies dying, his new wife Ilga (now Countess Luckstein) comes down a spiral stair and walks slowly across the room and out onto the terrace; she is asleep and sees nothing. Morrice makes his escape, accidentally leaving behind a small locked gold box given to him by Sir Julian which, though he does not realise it, contains a miniature of Miss Marston.

Morrice returns to his English estate in Cumberland. Unable to settle, he accepts an invitation from his cousin Lord Elmscott to visit London, where all the talk is of the beautiful young widow, Countess Lukstein. She appears genuinely interested in Morrice, and encourages further visits. Morrice falls in love, and it seems that the feeling may be reciprocated, although Ilga is also seeing another man, Hugh Marston. He is the brother of Miss Marston, who has recently married and is now Lady Tracy.

Morrice has not thus far felt able to tell the Countess that he was her husband's killer. Although he feels no guilt – it being an honourable killing – he wishes to spare Ilga from the knowledge that even while betrothed to her, her finance had been involved with another woman. When Marston discovers Morrice's involvement, he determines to break the news to Ilga himself, building on her own suspicions that Miss Marston is Morrice's secret lover. Morrice and Marston cross swords, and Marston is killed.

Morrice accepts an invitation to visit Ilga, now back at Castle Lukstein. There, he walks into a trap and is seized by her servants. Unwilling to mention anything to the dishonour of her late husband, Morrice cannot convince Ilga that he has not been unfaithful to her. She has long thought that Morrice had a woman with him when he broke into the castle, as she had seen a woman's footprints on the snowy terrace – although the footprints were in fact her own. She is further suspicious of his reaction when unexpectedly presented with Miss Marston's miniature, from the locked box. She directs that Morrice be taken into servitude, and he spends several months a captive working as a woodsman in the mountains.

Eventually escaping, Morrice travels to Innspruck, where he finds that Ilga has been searching for him. She has at last learned the truth of her late husband's infidelity from Jack Larke and Lord Elmscott, who had carried out investigations of their own when Morrice did not return from his last visit to Castle Lukstein. Morrice and Ilga are reconciled.

== Principal characters ==
- Morrice Buckler, narrator, wealthy gentleman, Ilga's suitor
- Ilga, Countess Lukstein
- Sir Julian Harnwood, old friend of Morrice, condemned to die
- Count Lukstein, treacherous informant
- Jack Larke, fellow scholar and friend of Morrice
- Lord Elmscott, Morrice's cousin
- Hugh Marston, Ilga's suitor
- Miss Marston, later Lady Tracy, Marston's sister

== Critical reception ==
In his 1923 review of contemporary authors, Arthur St John Adcock said that the publication of The Courtship of Morrice Buckler in 1896 had instantly established Mason as an extraordinarily popular novelist. The book was "the novel of the day ... read and talked about everywhere".
