= Ralph Grey, 4th Baron Grey of Werke =

English peer

Neville's Name Act 1706
- Act of Parliament
- Parliament of England
- Long title: An‌‌‌‌‌ ‌‌‌‌Act‌‌‌‌ ‌‌‌‌‌to‌‌‌‌‌ ‌‌enable‌‌‌‌ ‌‌‌‌Henry‌‌ ‌‌‌‌Grey‌‌‌‌,‌‌‌‌ ‌‌‌‌second‌‌‌‌ ‌‌‌‌Son‌‌‌‌ ‌‌‌‌‌of‌‌‌ ‌‌‌Richard‌‌‌ ‌‌‌Neville‌‌‌ ‌‌Esquire‌‌,‌‌ ‌to change his Name from Nevill to Grey, according to the Will of Ralph Lord Grey deceased.
- Citation: 6 Ann. c. 2 Pr. (Ruffhead: 5 Ann. c. 2 Pr.)

Dates
- Royal assent: 28 January 1707

Ralph Grey, 4th Baron Grey of Werke (c. 1661 – 1706) was an English peer who served as Governor of Barbados and as one of the English commissioners for the negotiations on the Treaty of Union between England and Scotland.

The second son of Ralph Grey, 2nd Baron Grey of Werke, he became an officer in the Army. A Whig, he was a Member of Parliament for Berwick from 1679 to 1681 and attended King William III following the Glorious Revolution of 1688. He was again a member for Berwick from 1695 to 1698 and briefly in 1701. He was Auditor of Wales from 1692 to 1702 and also Governor of Barbados from 1698 to 1701. On 24 June 1701, on the death of his older brother Ford Grey, 1st Earl of Tankerville, he succeeded as Baron Grey of Werke, taking him from the House of Commons into the House of Lords.

Appointed as one of the thirty-one English commissioners for the negotiation of the Treaty of Union, he died on 20 June 1706, shortly before the Articles of Union were settled on 22 July, and was buried at Bocking, Essex.

Grey's estates in Northumberland were inherited by a nephew, Henry Neville, a son of his sister Katherine Grey by her marriage to Richard Neville, and Henry Neville then changed his name to Grey by a private act of Parliament, Neville's Name Act 1706 (6 Ann. c. 2 Pr.).

== Notes ==
Peerage of England
Preceded by Ford Grey	Baron Grey of Werke; 1701–1706	Extinct
