= Baron Grey of Werke =

Extinct barony in the Peerage of England

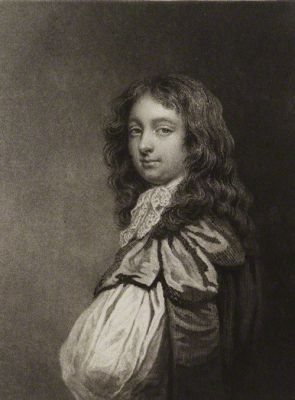
Ford Grey, 1st Earl of Tankerville

Baron Grey of Werke (or Warke), of Chillingham in the County of Northumberland, was a title in the Peerage of England. It was created on 11 February 1624 for Sir William Grey, 1st Baronet. He had already been created a baronet, of Chillingham in the County of Northumberland, in the Baronetage of England on 15 June 1619. The third Baron was created Viscount Glendale and Earl of Tankerville in the Peerage of England in 1695. He left two daughters but no sons and on his death in 1701 the viscountcy and earldom became extinct. He was succeeded in the barony by his younger brother, the fourth Baron. The latter had previously represented Berwick in Parliament. The barony became extinct on his death in 1706.

Lady Mary Grey, eldest daughter of the first Earl of Tankerville, married Charles Bennet, 2nd Baron Ossulston. In 1716 the earldom of Tankerville was revived in the latter's favour (see Earl of Tankerville).

== Barons Grey of Werke (or Warke) (1624) ==
- William Grey, 1st Baron Grey of Werke (d. 1674)
- Ralph Grey, 2nd Baron Grey of Werke (1630–1675)
- Ford Grey, 3rd Baron Grey of Werke (1655–1701) (created Earl of Tankerville in 1695)

== Earls of Tankerville (1695) ==
- Ford Grey, 3rd Baron Grey of Werke, 1st Earl of Tankerville (1655–1701)

== Barons Grey of Werke (or Warke) (1624; reverted) ==
- Ralph Grey, 4th Baron Grey of Werke (1661–1706)

== See also ==
- Earl of Tankerville
