= Ralph Gray =

Ralph Gray may refer to:

- Ralph Gray (politician) (died 1813), seigneur and politician in Lower Canada
- Ralph Gray (industrialist) (died 1863), co-founder of American glass company Hemingray
- Ralph Gray (union leader) (died 1931), co-leader of Alabama Share Cropper's Union

== See also ==
- Ralph Grey (disambiguation)
