= William Grey, 1st Baron Grey of Werke =

English politician

Sir William Grey, 1st Baron Grey of Werke

Personal details
- Born: August 1593 Chillingham, Northumberland, England
- Died: 29 July 1674 (aged 80) Epping, Essex, England
- Spouse: Lady Cecilia Wentworth
- Children: 1. Lady Mary Elisabeth Grey; 2. Thomas Grey; 3. Sir Ralph Grey; 4. Elizabeth Grey; 5. Talbot Grey; 6. Edward Grey; 7. Dame Catharine Grey
- Parent(s): Sir Ralph Grey of Chillingham; Lady Jane Arthington
- Occupation: Politician

William Grey, 1st Baron Grey of Werke (August 1593 – 29 July 1674) was an English politician who sat in the House of Commons from 1621 to 1622. He supported the Parliamentary cause in the English Civil War.

== Early life ==
Grey was the son of Sir Ralph Grey, of Chillingham, Northumberland and his wife Jane, daughter of WilIiam Ardlington, of Ardlington, Berkshire. He was created baronet on 15 June 1619. In 1621, he was elected Member of Parliament for Northumberland. He succeeded to the estates of Chillingham and Werke on the death of his father and was created Baron Grey of Werke on 11 February 1624.

== Career ==
Grey was commander of parliamentarian forces in the east in 1642. He was imprisoned for refusing to go as commissioner to Scotland in 1643. He was speaker of House of Lords in 1643 and was one of the Lay Assessors at the Westminster Assembly from 1643 to 1649. In 1648 he was appointed a commissioner of great seal but refused the engagement in 1649. He was pardoned at Restoration.

== Personal life ==
Grey married Cecilia Wentworth, eldest daughter of Sir John Wentworth, 1st Baronet, of Gosfield. He was succeeded by his eldest son, Ralph Grey, 2nd Baron Grey of Werke. His daughter Katherine married Sir Edward Mosley, 2nd Baronet.

Parliament of England
Preceded by Sir Henry Widdrington; Sir William Selby	Member of Parliament for Northumberland; 1621–1622; With: Sir Henry Widdrington	Succeeded by Sir John Fenwick; Sir Francis Brandling
Peerage of England
New creation	Baron Grey of Werke; 1624–1674	Succeeded by Ralph Grey
Baronetage of England
New creation	Baronet (of Chillingham); 1619–1674	Succeeded by Ralph Grey
