= Henry Grey (MP) =

British Whig politician

Neville's Name Act 1706
- Act of Parliament
- Parliament of England
- Long title: An‌‌‌‌‌ ‌‌‌‌Act‌‌‌‌ ‌‌‌‌‌to‌‌‌‌‌ ‌‌enable‌‌‌‌ ‌‌‌‌Henry‌‌ ‌‌‌‌Grey‌‌‌‌,‌‌‌‌ ‌‌‌‌second‌‌‌‌ ‌‌‌‌Son‌‌‌‌ ‌‌‌‌‌of‌‌‌ ‌‌‌Richard‌‌‌ ‌‌‌Neville‌‌‌ ‌‌Esquire‌‌,‌‌ ‌to change his Name from Nevill to Grey, according to the Will of Ralph Lord Grey deceased.
- Citation: 6 Ann. c. 2 Pr. (Note: This is the citation in The Statutes of the Realm.); 5 Ann. c. 2 Pr. (Note: This is the citation in The Statutes at Large.)
- Territorial extent: England and Wales

Dates
- Royal assent: 28 January 1707
- Commencement: 3 December 1706 (Note: Start of session)

Status: Current legislation

Henry Grey (17 August 1683 – 9 September 1740) was a British Whig politician who sat in the House of Commons between 1709 and 1740.

Grey was born as Henry Neville, the younger son of Richard Neville of Billingbear House in Berkshire and his wife Katherine Grey, daughter of Ralph Grey, 2nd Baron Grey of Werke. He travelled abroad in Holland, Germany, Italy and France between 1699 and 1700. In 1707, he changed his surname to Grey by a private act of Parliament, Neville's Name Act 1706 (6 Ann. c. 2 Pr.) to inherit the estates of his uncle Ralph Grey, 4th Baron Grey of Werke, in Northumberland.

Grey entered Parliament for Wendover at a by-election on 21 November 1709, through the influence of his friend Richard Hampden. He successfully contested this seat at the 1710 British general election, but was defeated when he stood at Orford in the same election. Financial difficulties and attempts to sell his northern estates precluded him from taking an active part in Parliament. He was politically a Whig, and voted against peace with Spain in 1711. He was defeated at Berwick-upon-Tweed at the 1713 British general election, despite the Grey interest in that town, and at a by-election at Wallingford in 1714.

Grey returned to Parliament as MP for Wallingford at a by-election on 1 December 1719. At the 1722 British general election he was defeated at Berkshire, but was returned at a by-election on 11 March 1723 for Berwick-upon-Tweed, where his brother Grey Neville held the other seat. When his brother died later in 1723, he inherited his brother's estate of Billingbear House. He was returned at the 1734 British general election for Reading.

Grey married Elizabeth Griffin, daughter of James Griffin, 2nd Baron Griffin of Braybrooke in 1720, but they had no children. He died on 9 September 1740.

== Notes ==
Parliament of Great Britain
Preceded by Sir Roger Hill; Thomas Ellys	Member of Parliament for Wendover; 1709–1713; With: Sir Roger Hill	Succeeded by Sir Roger Hill; Richard Hampden
Preceded by Edmund Dunch; William Hucks	Member of Parliament for Wallingford; 1719–1722; With: William Hucks	Succeeded by William Hucks; Viscount Parker
Preceded by Grey Neville; The Viscount Barrington	Member of Parliament for Berwick-upon-Tweed; 1723–1727; With: Grey Neville 1723; William Kerr 1723–1727	Succeeded by Joseph Sabine; George Liddell
Preceded by Richard Thompson; Richard Potenger	Member of Parliament for Reading; 1734–1740; With: Richard Potenger 1734–1739; John Blagrave 1739–1740	Succeeded by John Blagrave; William Strode
