= Ralph Grey, 2nd Baron Grey of Werke =

English peer

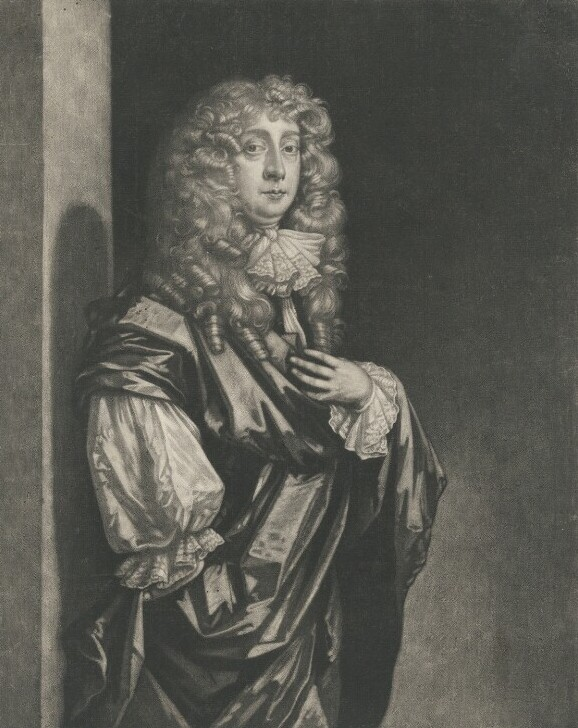
Engraving of Grey by Alexander Browne

Ralph Grey, 2nd Baron Grey of Werke (27 October 1630 – 15 June 1675) was an English peer.

== Early life ==
Grey was baptised on 27 October 1630. He was the eldest son of William Grey, 1st Baron Grey of Werke and the former Cecilia Wentworth. The family seat was Chillingham Castle in Northumberland. He had two sisters, Hon. Elizabeth Grey and Hon. Katherine Grey (who married Sir Edward Mosley, 2nd Baronet, Charles North, 5th Baron North, and Capt. Francis Russell, Governor of Barbados).

His paternal grandparents were Sir Ralph Grey, of Chillingham and Warke, and, his first wife, Jane Ardington (a daughter of William Ardington). His maternal grandparents were Sir John Wentworth, 1st Baronet, of Gosfield and the former Lady Catherine Finch (a daughter of Sir Moyle Finch, 1st Baronet and Elizabeth Finch, suo jure Countess of Winchilsea).

== Career ==
His father was created a baronet on 15 June 1619 before being elevated to the Peerage of England as Baron Grey of Werke on 11 February 1624. Upon his father's death on 29 July 1674, he succeeded as the second Baron Grey of Werke, but died less than a year later.

== Personal life ==
Grey married Catharine Colepeper (1634-c. 1682), widow of Hon. Alexander Colepeper (eldest son and heir apparent of John Colepeper, 1st Baron Colepeper). She was the only surviving daughter and heiress of Sir Edward Ford and Sarah Ireton (daughter of German Ireton). Together, they were the parents of:

- Ford Grey, 1st Earl of Tankerville (1655–1701), who married Lady Mary Berkeley, daughter of George Berkeley, 1st Earl of Berkeley.
- Ralph Grey, 4th Baron Grey of Warke (d. c. 1706), an officer in the Army and Whig MP for Berwick who served as Auditor of Wales and Governor of Barbados.
- Hon. Charles Grey (d. before 1706)
- Hon. Catherine Grey, who married Richard Neville, MP for Berkshire, who was the eldest son and heir of Col. Richard Neville, of Billingbere.

Neville's Name Act 1706
- Act of Parliament
- Parliament of England
- Long title: An‌‌‌‌‌ ‌‌‌‌Act‌‌‌‌ ‌‌‌‌‌to‌‌‌‌‌ ‌‌enable‌‌‌‌ ‌‌‌‌Henry‌‌ ‌‌‌‌Grey‌‌‌‌,‌‌‌‌ ‌‌‌‌second‌‌‌‌ ‌‌‌‌Son‌‌‌‌ ‌‌‌‌‌of‌‌‌ ‌‌‌Richard‌‌‌ ‌‌‌Neville‌‌‌ ‌‌Esquire‌‌,‌‌ ‌to change his Name from Nevill to Grey, according to the Will of Ralph Lord Grey deceased.
- Citation: 6 Ann. c. 2 Pr. {Ruffhead: 5 Ann. c. 2 Pr.)

Dates
- Royal assent: 28 January 1707

Lord Grey died on 15 June 1675 and was buried at Harting, Sussex. He was succeeded in the barony by his eldest son Ford, who was created Viscount Glendale and Earl of Tankerville in 1695. Following his death on 24 June 1701, when the viscountcy of Glendale and the earldom of Tankerville became extinct and the barony of Grey of Warke passed to his younger brother, Ralph, the fourth and final Baron Grey of Werke. The Grey estates in Northumberland were inherited by his grandson, Henry Neville, the son of his daughter Katherine. Henry then changed his name to Grey by a private act of Parliament, Neville's Name Act 1706 (6 Ann. c. 2 Pr.).

Peerage of England
Preceded by William Grey	Baron Grey of Werke; 1674–1675	Succeeded by Ford Grey
