= Richard Neville (the younger) =

English Whig politician

Richard Neville (12 October 1655 – 1 July 1717) of Billingbear, Berkshire, was an English Whig politician, who sat in the English and British House of Commons from 1695 to 1710.

== Early life ==
Billingbear House, Berkshire, in 1669

Neville was second but eldest surviving son of Richard Neville (1615–1676) of Billingbear House in Berkshire, and his wife Anne Heydon, daughter of Sir John Heydon of Baconthorpe, Norfolk. His father had been a gentleman of the privy chamber and colonel of the forces to Charles I. Neville was admitted at the Middle Temple in 1673 and inherited Billingbear on his father's death in 1678. He married Catharine Grey, daughter of Ralph Grey, 2nd Baron Grey of Werke.

== Career ==
Neville was a country Whig and stood for Parliament at Berkshire at the 1690 English general election, but was narrowly defeated. At the 1695 English general election, he was returned unopposed as Member of Parliament for Berkshire. He signed the Association and voted for fixing the price of guineas at 22 shillings in March. He voted for the attainder of Sir John Fenwick on 25 November 1696. At the 1698 English general election he was returned unopposed again and voted against the third reading of the disbanding bill on 18 January 1699. He was a follower of his brother-in-law, Lord Tankerville, who was a Treasury lord. At the two general elections of 1701, he was also returned unopposed. He was returned in a contest at the 1702 English general election. At the 1705 English general election, he was returned again in a contest. In that year he was joined in the House of Commons by his son Grey Neville. He voted for the Court candidate as Speaker on 25 October 1705, and supported the Court on the 'place clause' of the regency bill on 18 February 1706. He was returned unopposed as a Whig at the 1708 British general election. He spoke in favour of the bill for the naturalization of the Palatines in 1709 and voted for the impeachment of Dr Sacheverell in 1710. He lost his seat at Berkshire at the 1710 British general election.

== Death and legacy ==
Neville died on 1 July 1717 and left three children: Grey Neville, Henry Neville, also MP and Catherine, the paternal grandmother of Richard Aldworth Neville, 2nd Baron Braybrooke

Parliament of England
Preceded by Sir Humphrey Forster; Sir Henry Winchcombe	Member of Parliament for Berkshire; 1695–1707; With: Sir Humphrey Forster 1695–1701; Sir John Stonhouse 1701–1707	Succeeded by Parliament of Great Britain
Parliament of Great Britain
Preceded by Parliament of England	Member of Parliament for Berkshire; 1707–1710; With: Sir John Stonhouse	Succeeded by Sir John Stonhouse; Henry St John
