= Clement Kent =

English politician (died 1746)

Clement Kent (c. 1682 – 25 December 1746) was an English politician. He sat as MP for Wallingford from 1705 till 1708 and Reading from 1722 till 1727.

He was the first son of Clement Kent (died 1701) and Sarah, the daughter of Sebastian Lyford. He was matriculated at Balliol College, Oxford on 12 June 1700 at the age of 17. He entered the Inner Temple in 1700. On 8 January 1704, he married Barsheba Marsh and they had two sons.
